= Mayans M.C. season 3 =

American TV show season

Mayans M.C.
- Season 3
- Starring: J. D. Pardo; Clayton Cardenas; Sarah Bolger; Michael Irby; Carla Baratta; Richard Cabral; Raoul Max Trujillo; Danny Pino; Edward James Olmos; Sulem Calderon
- No. of episodes: 10

Release
- Original network: FX
- Original release: March 16 – May 11, 2021

Season chronology
- ← Previous; Season 2 Next → Season 4

The third season of Mayans M.C., an American crime drama, premiered on FX, on March 16, 2021, and concluded on May 11, 2021. The third season consisted of ten episodes and aired on Tuesdays in the United States on FX. Mayans M.C. is an American crime drama television series created by Kurt Sutter and Elgin James. The show takes place in the same fictional universe as Sons of Anarchy, and deals with the Sons' rivals-turned-allies, the Mayans Motorcycle Club.

== Production ==
In November 2019, the series was renewed for a third season which premiered on March 16, 2021. The season is the first without showrunner Kurt Sutter, who created Sons of Anarchy. President of original programming at FX Entertainment Nick Grad said; "We're happy to continue telling the story of Mayans MC with our partners at Fox 21 and excited that Elgin James has earned the opportunity to become the series' showrunner."

The season is the first not to be distributed by 20th Television and instead is distributed by Disney-ABC Domestic Television due to the Disney-FOX merger in December 2017.

== Cast and characters ==
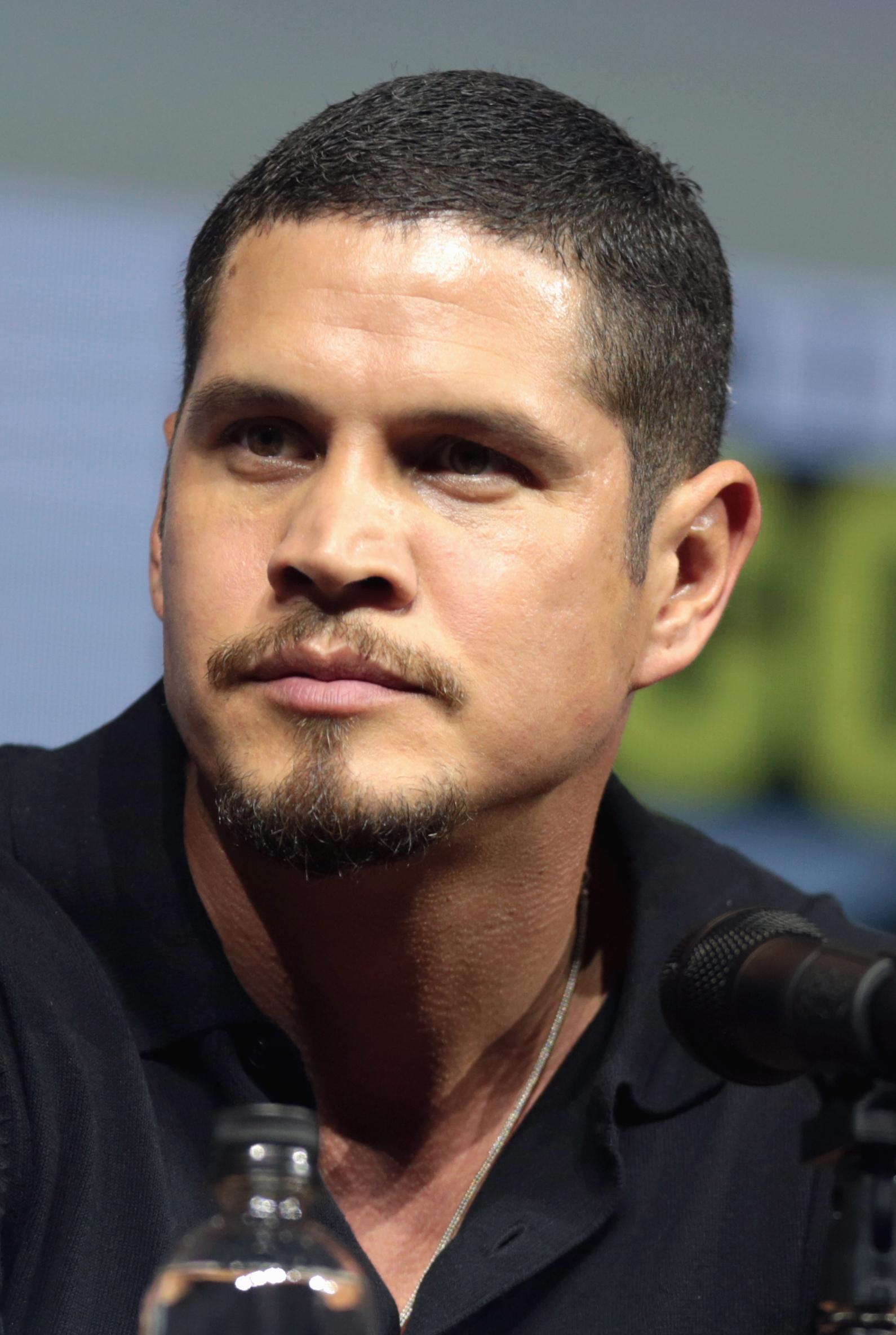
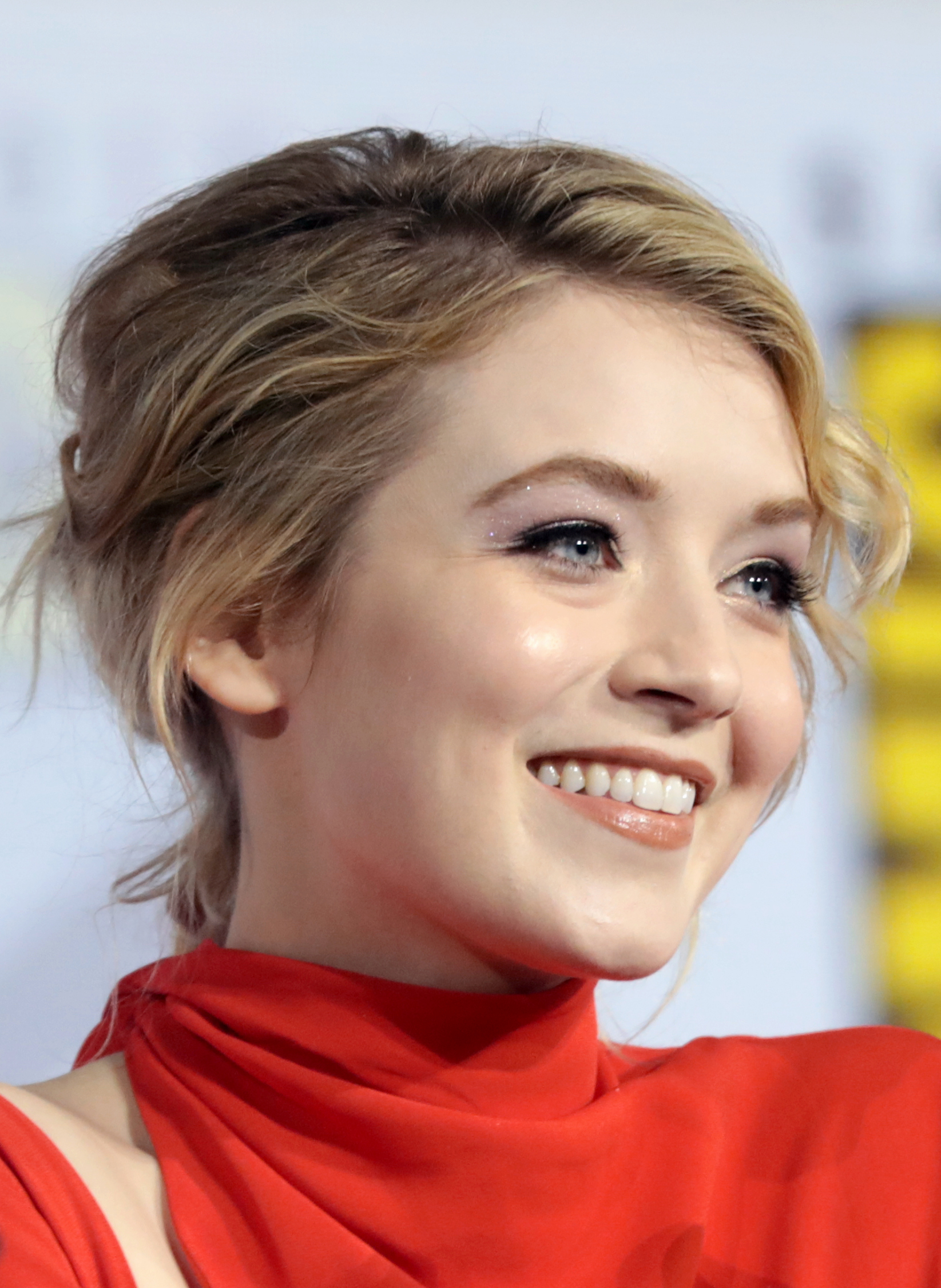
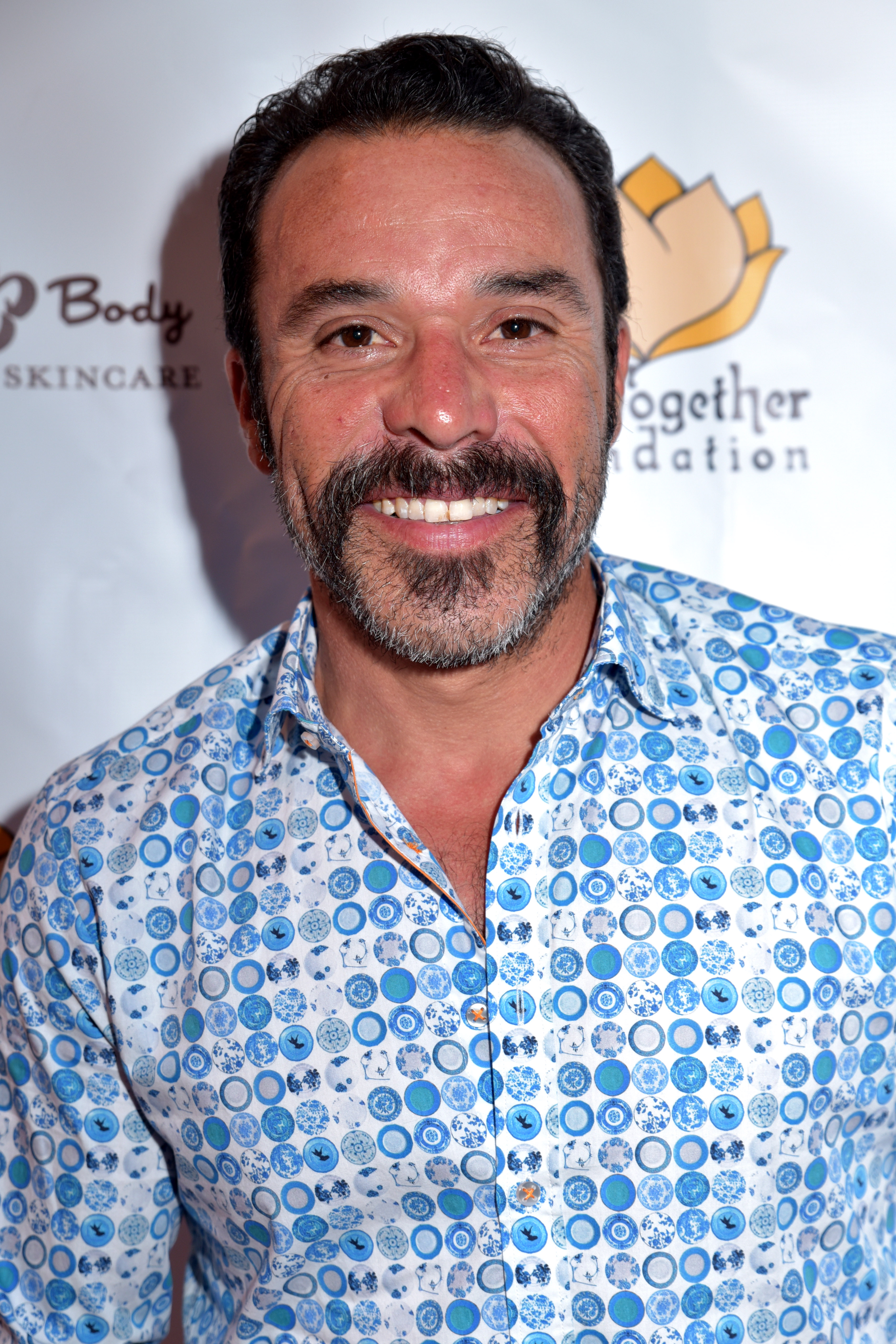
J. D. Pardo (Ezekiel "EZ" Reyes), Sarah Bolger (Emily Thomas), and Michael Irby (Obispo "Bishop" Losa)
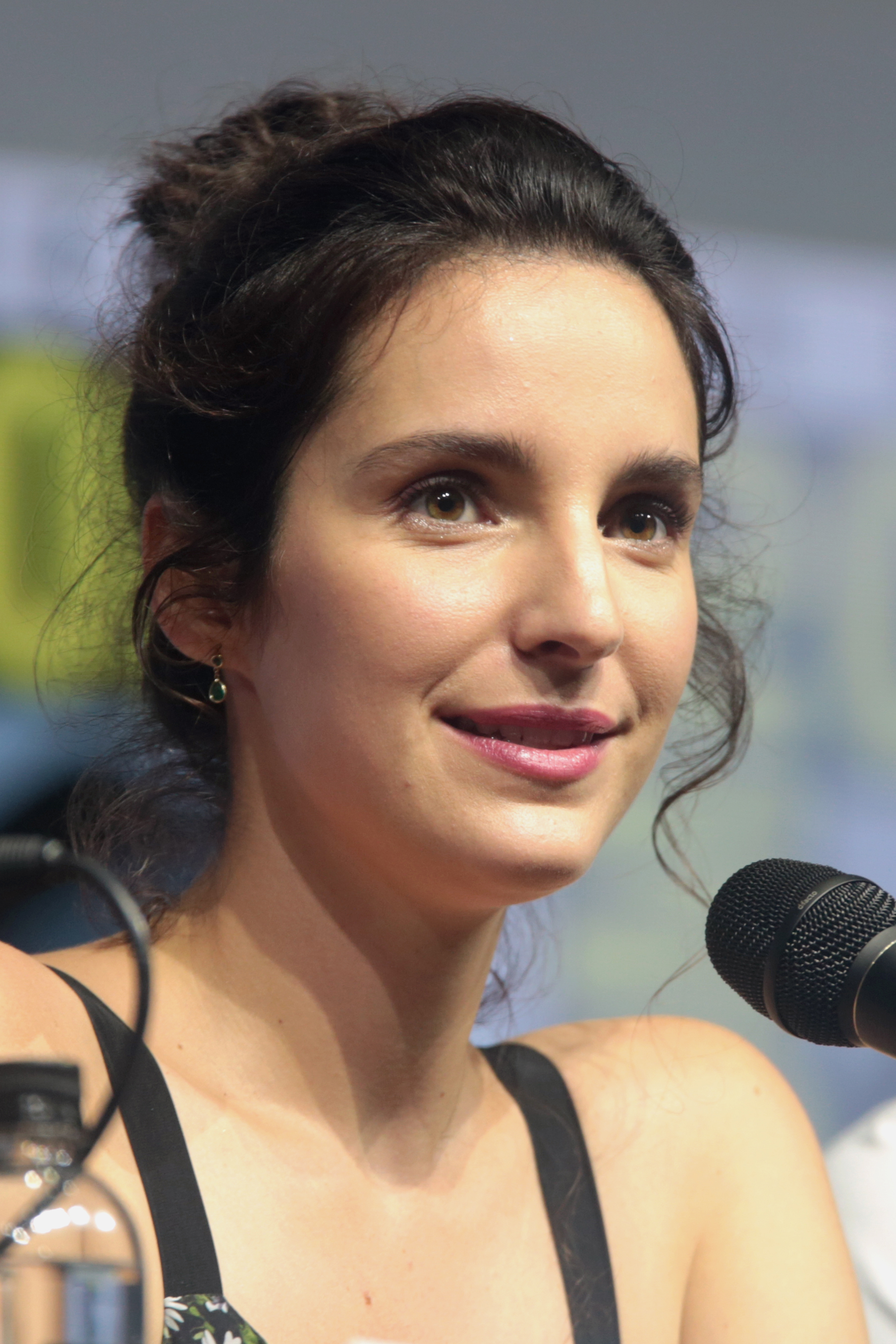
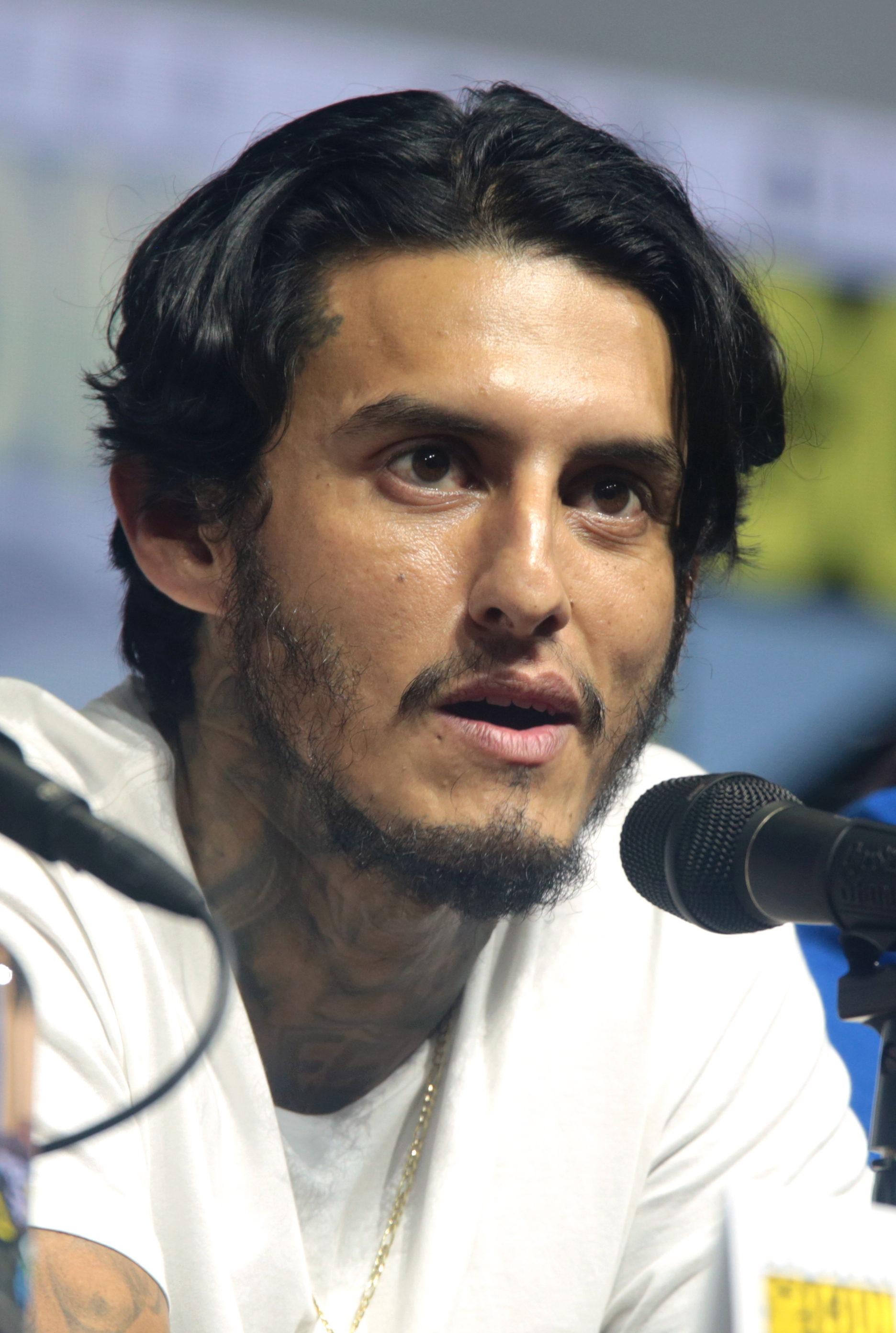
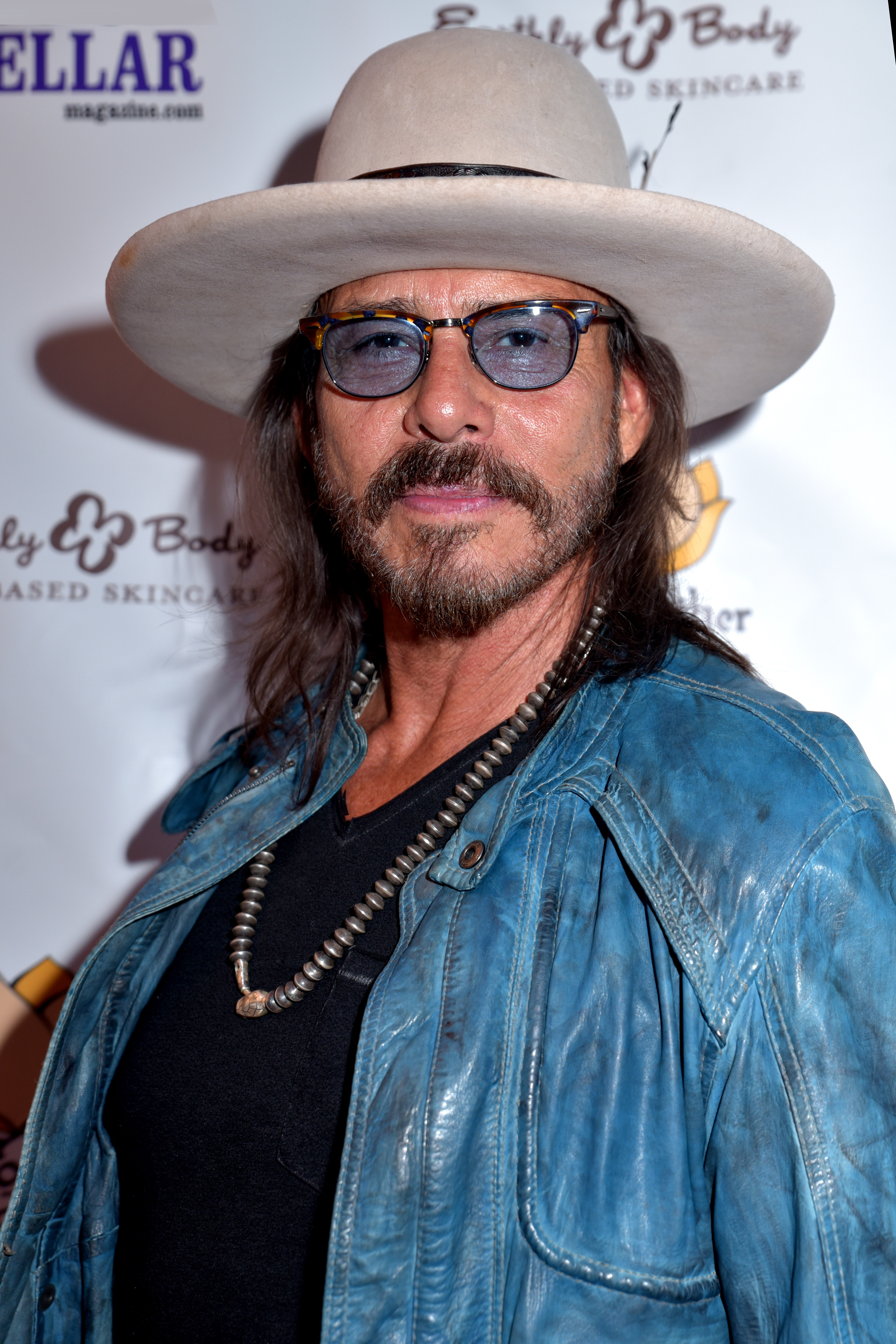
Carla Baratta (Adelita), Richard Cabral (Johnny "El Coco" Cruz), and Raoul Trujillo (Che "Taza" Romero)

=== Main ===
- J. D. Pardo as Ezekiel "EZ" Reyes, a full patch for the Mayans and brother to Angel Reyes.
- Clayton Cardenas as Angel Reyes, EZ's brother and Él Secretario of Mayans M.C., Santo Padre Charter
- Sarah Bolger as Emily Thomas, childhood sweetheart of EZ, who is now married to Miguel Galindo, and the mother of their infant son.
- Michael Irby as Obispo "Bishop" Losa, president of Mayans M.C.'s Santo Padre Charter.
- Carla Baratta as Adelita, who as a child, watched her family die at the hands of the Galindo cartel.
- Richard Cabral as Johnny "El Coco" Cruz, a full patch member of Mayans M.C.
- Raoul Trujillo as Che "Taza" Romero, Vice Presidente of Mayans M.C., Santo Padre Charter.
- Danny Pino as Miguel Galindo, the son of Galindo Cartel founder Jose Galindo.
- Edward James Olmos as Felipe Reyes, the once-strong Mexican patriarch and Angel and EZ's father.
- Emilio Rivera as Marcus Álvarez, Consejero to Miguel Galindo, former president of the Mayans M.C. Oakland Charter and national president of the Mayans M.C., cousin of Obispo "Bishop" Losa
- Sulem Calderon as Gabriela "Gaby" Castillo, newly immigrated to the U.S. from Oaxaca, Mexico, she seeks to build a brighter future for herself and her family. After moving to Santo Padre, she starts a relationship with EZ until she leaves for Lodi to attend nursing school.

=== Special guests ===
- Ray McKinnon as Lincoln "Linc" James Potter, reprising his role from Sons of Anarchy as the Assistant U.S. Attorney, now investigating both the Mayans M.C. and Los Olvidados.
- David Labrava as Happy Lowman, SAMCRO Sergeant-at-Arms, who is responsible for the death of EZ and Angel's mother.

=== Recurring ===
- Frankie Loyal as Hank "El Tranq" Loza, a former bare-knuckle brawler and El Pacificador (Sgt-at-Arms) of the Mayans M.C., Santo Padre Charter.
- Joseph Lucero as Neron "Creeper" Vargas, an ex-junkie from Los Angeles and Capitan Del Camino (Road Captain) of the Mayans M.C., Santo Padre Charter.
- Vincent Vargas as Gilberto "Gilly" Lopez, a former U.S. Army Ranger and a good-natured mixed martial arts (MMA) fighter and a full patch member of the Mayans M.C., Santo Padre Charter.
- Gino Vento as Nestor Oceteva, the head of security for the Galindo Cartel and a childhood friend of Miguel's who later becomes a prospect for the Mayans M.C., Santo Padre Charter.
- Joe Ordaz as Paco, Miguel's personal driver and a member of the Galindo Cartel.
- Salvador Chacón as Pablo, the second-in-command of Los Olvidados who serves as Adelita's right-hand man.
- Melony Ochoa as Mini, also known as "La Ratona" (The Mouse), a child member of Los Olvidados who has a close relationship with Adelita.
- Alexandra Barreto as Antonia Pena, the mayor of Santo Padre and Katrina's wife. She is the former lover of Bishop and the mother of their deceased son, Aidan Losa.
- Emily Tosta as Leticia Cruz, Coco's daughter who was raised by her grandmother Celia for most of her life believing she was his younger sister.
- Ivo Nandi as Oscar "El Oso" Ramos, reprising his role from Sons of Anarchy as the Presidente of the Mayans M.C., Stockton Charter and one of the three Kings of the Mayans M.C.
- Jimmy Gonzales as Canche, the Presidente of the Mayans M.C., Yuma Charter and one of the three Kings of the Mayans M.C.
- Mía Maestro as Sederica Palomo, the governor of Baja California who works with Miguel Galindo in secret.
- Efrat Dor as Anna Linares, a government agent working with Lincoln Potter in the investigation of the Mayans M.C. and Los Olvidados.
- Mike Beltran as Ibarra, the Presidente of the Mayans M.C., Tucson Charter and a close ally of the Santo Padre charter.
- Vanessa Giselle as Hope, a heroin addict who forms a close relationship with Coco. She is also a member of Isaac's drug community at Meth Mountain.
- Gregory Cruz as El Palo, El Unico (The One, aka President) of the Vatos Malditos Motorcycle Club, who make their money through human trafficking and recruit members without the prospecting process. He later patches over to the Mayans M.C., Yuma Charter. He is also the brother of Laura.
- Momo Rodriguez as Esteban "Steve" Estrada, a former prospect sponsored by Hank and now full patch member of the Mayans M.C., Santo Padre Charter, who's dreamed of joining a M.C. his whole life.
- Justina Adorno as Stephanie, also known as "Nails", one of the bartenders at the clubhouse of the Mayans M.C., Santo Padre Charter. She later becomes engaged to Angel after a recurring fling with him.
- Grace Rizzo as Jess, one of the bartenders at the clubhouse of the Mayans M.C., Santo Padre Charter whose sister, Jazmine, is close to a member of SAMDINO.
- Patricia de Leon as Diana Alvarez, the wife of Marcus Alvarez who lives in Santo Padre with him and their children. (Note: Previously played by Michelle Diaz in Sons of Anarchy.)
- Holland Roden as Erin Thomas, Emily Galindo's younger sister, who moves to Santo Padre to live with her and reconnect.
- JR Bourne as Isaac, the leader of a drug community based outside of Santo Padre at an encampment dubbed "Meth Mountain".
- Spenser Granese as Butterfly, a drug dealer and member of Isaac's drug community at Meth Mountain.
- Natalia Cordova-Buckley as Laura, El Palo's sister, who is distant from him for killing their brother.

=== Guests ===
- Edwin Hodge as Franky Rogan, a police officer in the Santo Padre Police Department.
- Greg Vrotsos as Terry, the Vice President of SAMDINO who seeks to start a war with the Mayans.
- Guillermo García as Ignacio, more commonly known as "El Banquero" (The Banker), the leader of Lobos Nueva Generación (LNG), a radical organization made up of the remnants of the Lobos Sonora Cartel, who were previously defeated by the Galindo Cartel under Jose Galindo.

== Episodes ==
No. overall	No. in season	Title	Directed by	Written by	Original release date	Prod. code	U.S. viewers (millions)
21	1	"Pap Struggles with the Death Angel"	Michael Dinner	Elgin James	March 16, 2021	3WBD01	0.840
A border shutdown squeezes the Mayan’s heroin trade setting off an internal clash over the future of the club. EZ and Angel grapple with the fallout of family secrets recently come to light. The Galindos grow apart as Miguel loses himself in his grief and search for answers.
22	2	"The Orneriness of Kings"	Michael Dinner	Sean Tretta	March 16, 2021	3WBD02	0.536
Now a full patch member, EZ proposes a bold plan that could change the course of the club; Adelita is freed from the U.S. government only to discover all is not as she left it with the L.O.; Coco's demons lead him to a new low.
23	3	"Overreaching Don't Pay"	Rachel Goldberg	Andrea Ciannavei & Jenny Lynn	March 23, 2021	3WBD03	0.843
EZ's brazen plan faces some unexpected hurdles, Coco finds a surprising sanctuary, and Emily is urged into an outing.
24	4	"Our Gang's Dark Oath"	Brett Dos Santos	Bryan Gracia & Sara Price	March 30, 2021	3WBD04	0.712
EZ agonises over the smuggling failure, but older deeds overshadow his romance with Gaby and the rocky relationships of both Angel and Bishop.
25	5	"Dark, Deep-Laid Plans"	Elgin James	Debra Moore Muñoz	April 6, 2021	3WBD05	0.605
Bishop hopes an old-school stunt can salvage the plan to break ranks with rival Mayans, even as other criminal players muscle in.
26	6	"You Can't Pray a Lie"	Elgin James	Andrea Ciannavei	April 13, 2021	3WBD06	0.727
EZ has a difficult time finding his footing in the club's hierarchy, and Angel loses himself to sex, booze, and violence.
27	7	"What Comes of Handlin' Snakeskin"	Elgin James	Bryan Gracia	April 20, 2021	3WBD07	0.872
Bishop enlists the help of another chapter in his move against Ramos, the man responsible for ordering the hit on EZ.
28	8	"A Mixed-up and Splendid Rescue"	Alonso Alvarez-Barreda	Jenny Lynn	April 27, 2021	3WBD08	0.793
Home truths prove distressing as Angel disrupts a family `brunch'. Miguel learns more of his mother's death, and Leticia fears Coco is beyond saving.
29	9	"The House of Death Floats By"	Elgin James	Sean Tretta	May 4, 2021	3WBD09	0.779
Attempting to right wrongs, EZ tries reconciliation. Miguel and Adelita each seek retribution, and Coco hopes a rescue will work.
30	10	"Chapter the Last, Nothing More to Write"	Elgin James	Elgin James & Debra Moore Muñoz	May 11, 2021	3WBD10	0.807
EZ plans to go out with a bang, old adversaries dice with death, and relationships are risked when faced with challenging choices.

== Reception ==
Paul Dailly of TV Fanatic said the first two episodes "were probably the most depressing episodes so far."
