= Mayans M.C. season 4 =

American TV show season

Mayans M.C.
- Season 4
- Starring: J. D. Pardo; Clayton Cardenas; Sarah Bolger; Michael Irby; Carla Baratta; Richard Cabral; Raoul Max Trujillo; Danny Pino; Edward James Olmos; Frankie Loyal; Joseph Lucero; Vincent Vargas
- No. of episodes: 10

Release
- Original network: FX
- Original release: April 19 – June 14, 2022

Season chronology
- ← Previous; Season 3 Next → Season 5

The fourth season of Mayans M.C., an American crime drama, premiered on FX, on April 19, 2022, and concluded on June 14, 2022; it consisted of ten episodes and aired on Tuesdays in the United States. The series was created by Kurt Sutter and Elgin James, takes place in the same fictional universe as Sons of Anarchy, and focuses on a rival motorcycle club.

== Production ==
In May 2021, the series was renewed for a fourth season, which premiered on April 19, 2022.

The season is distributed by Disney-ABC Domestic Television.

== Cast and characters ==
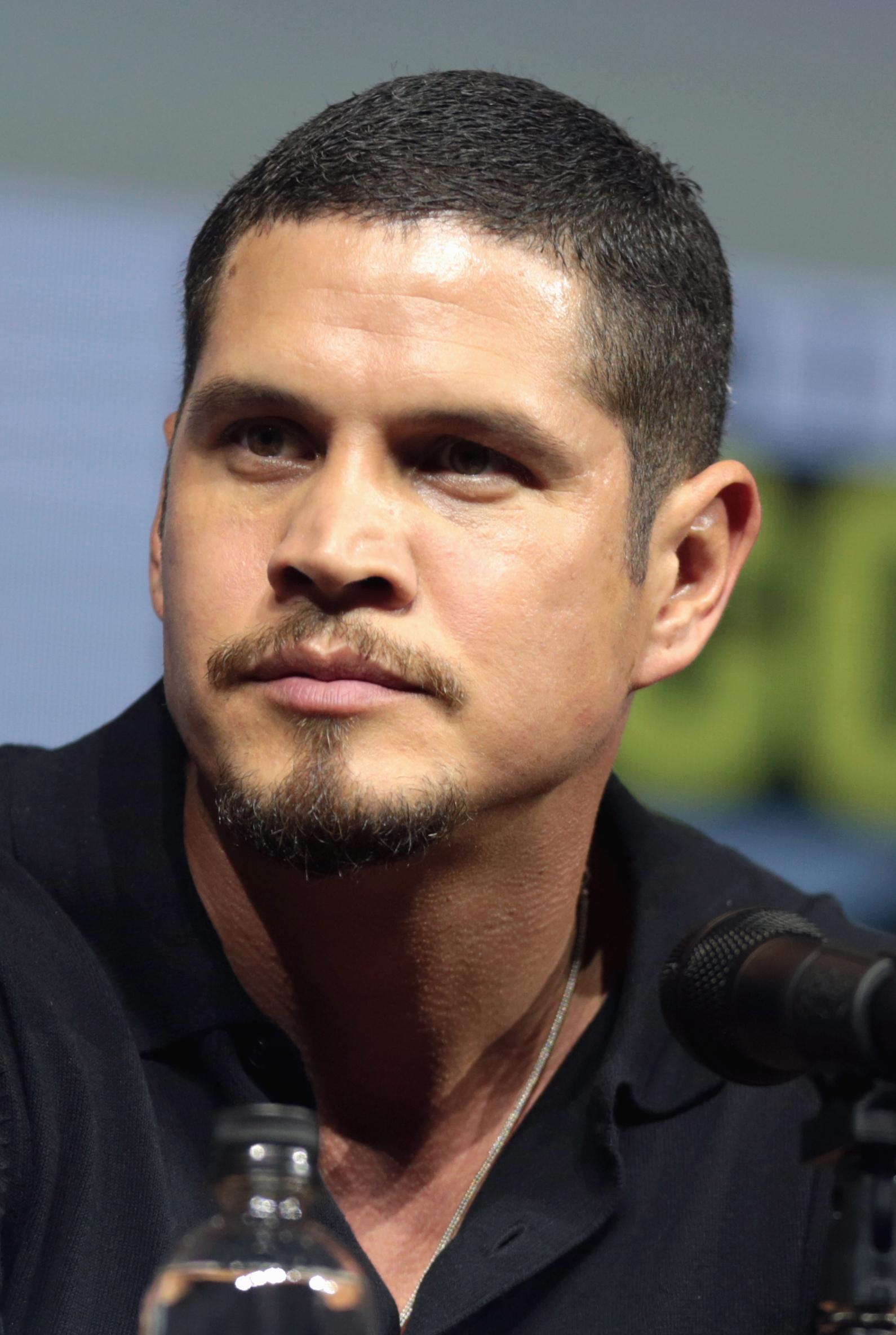
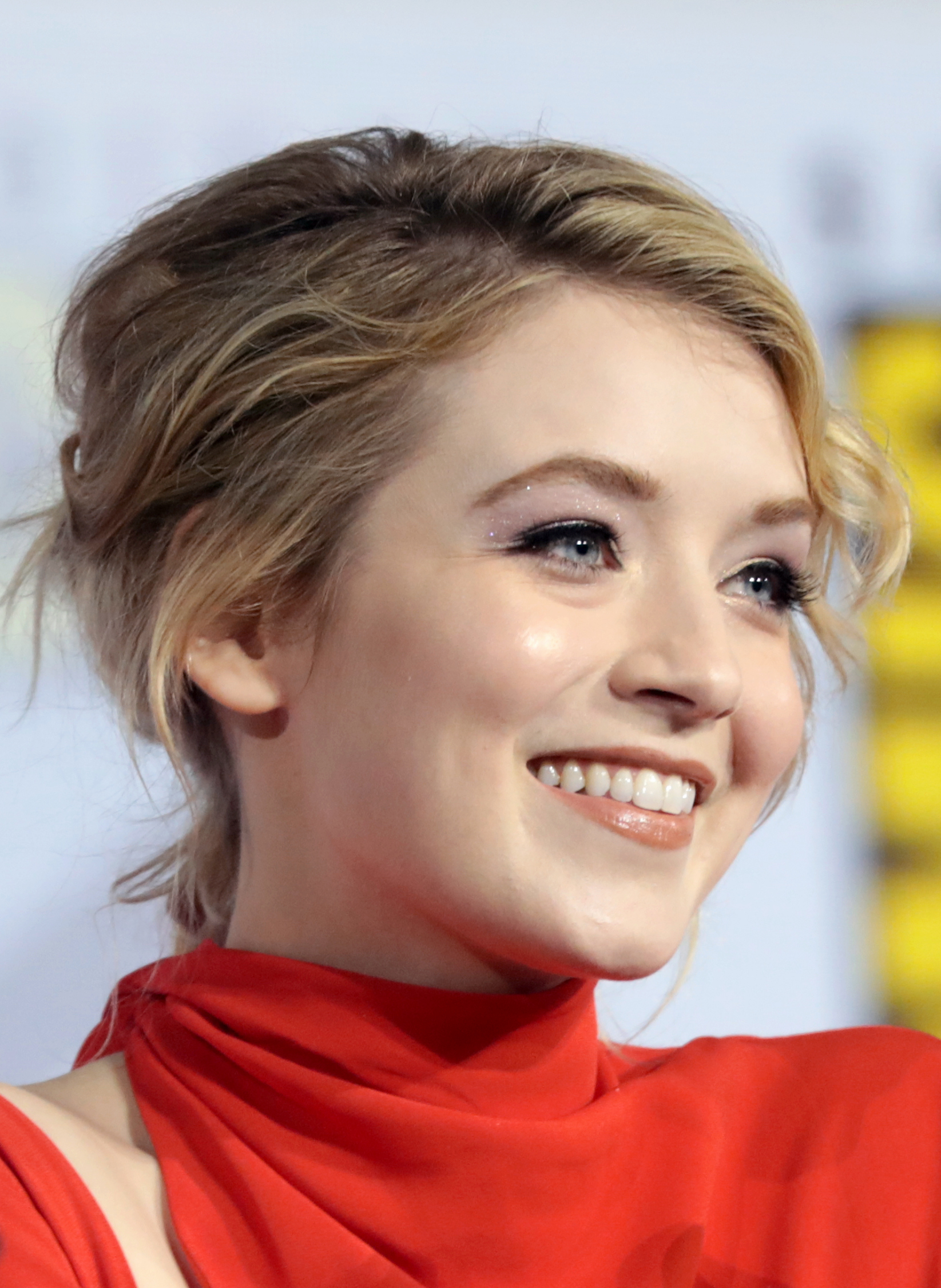
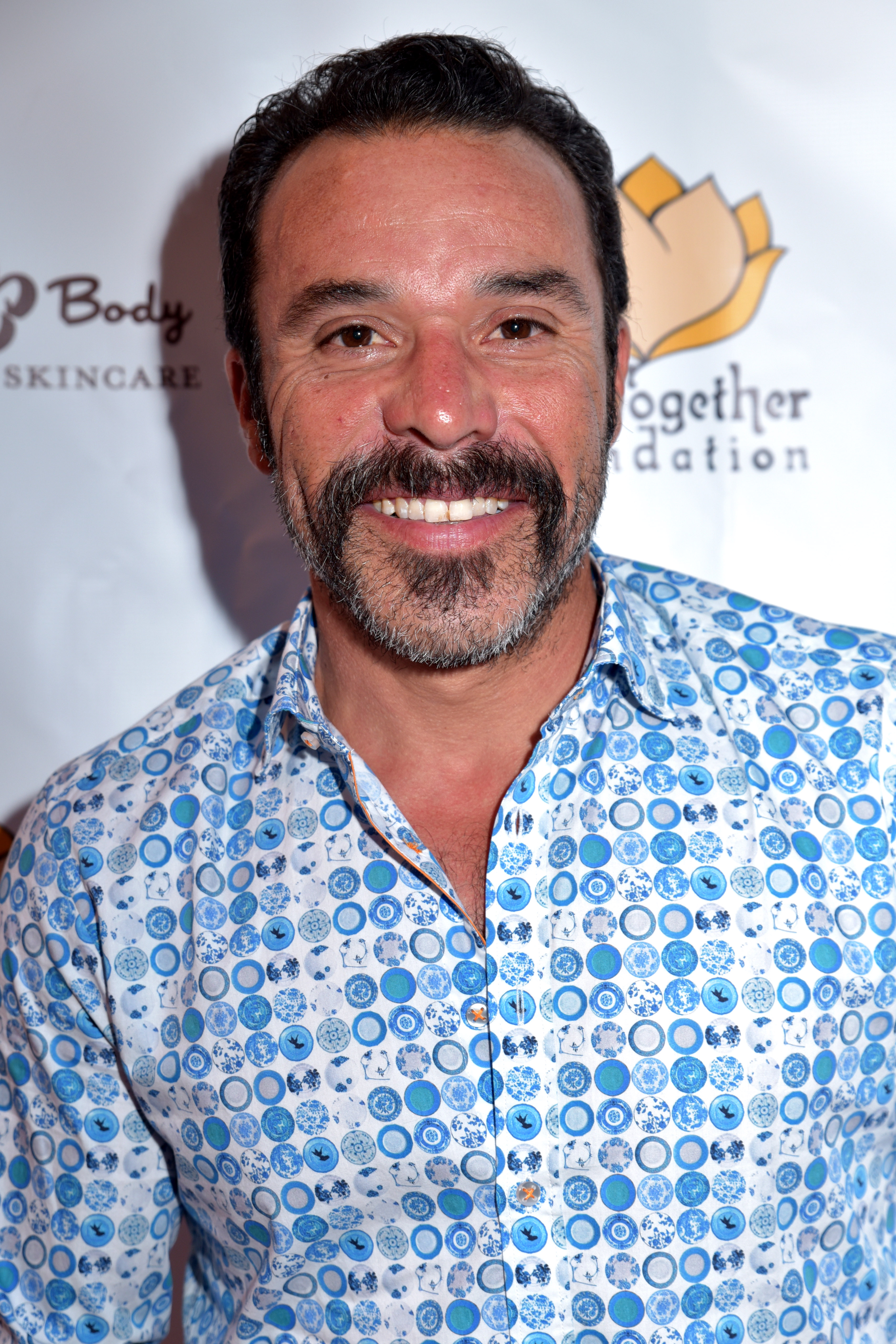
J. D. Pardo (Ezekiel "EZ" Reyes), Sarah Bolger (Emily Thomas), and Michael Irby (Obispo "Bishop" Losa)
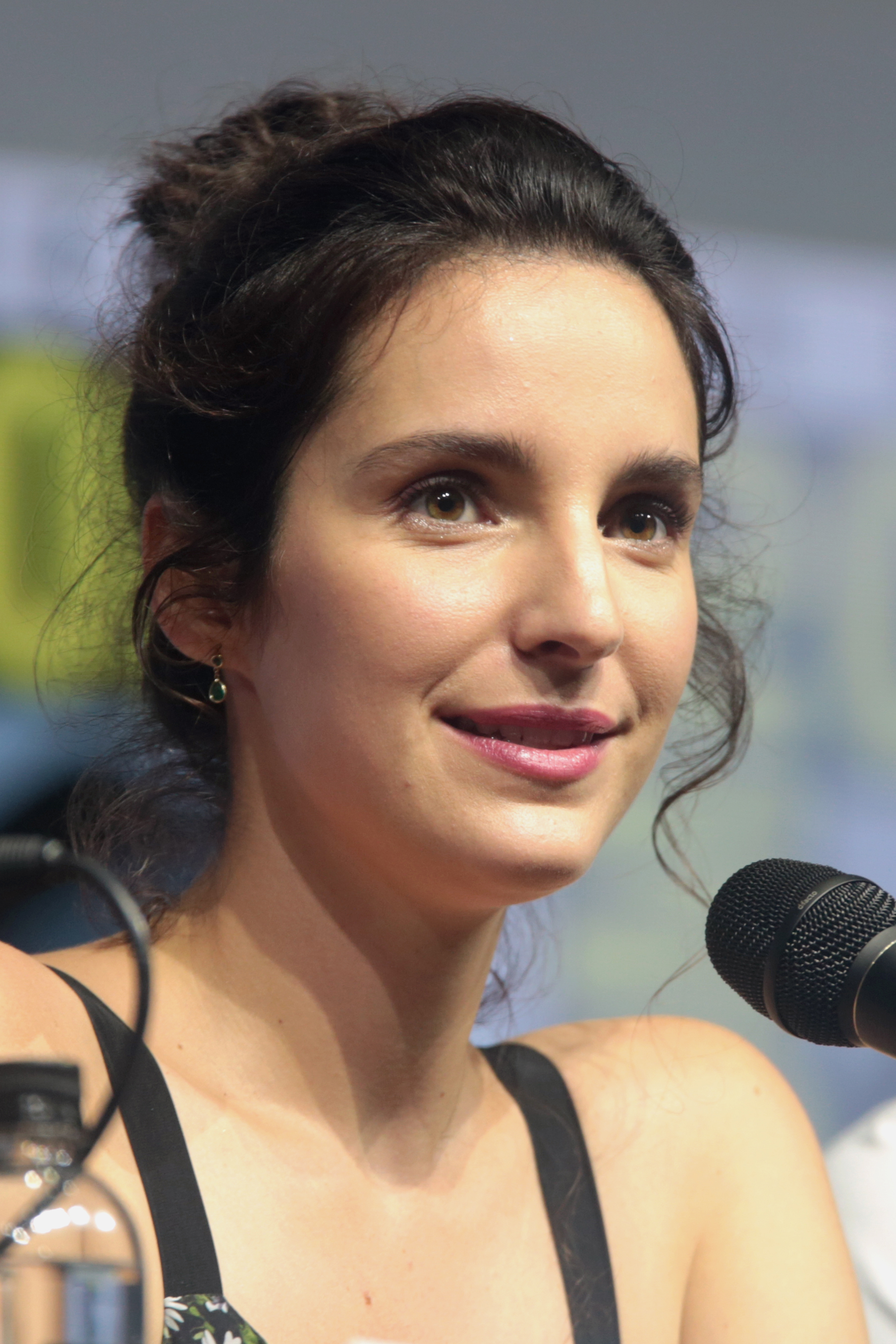
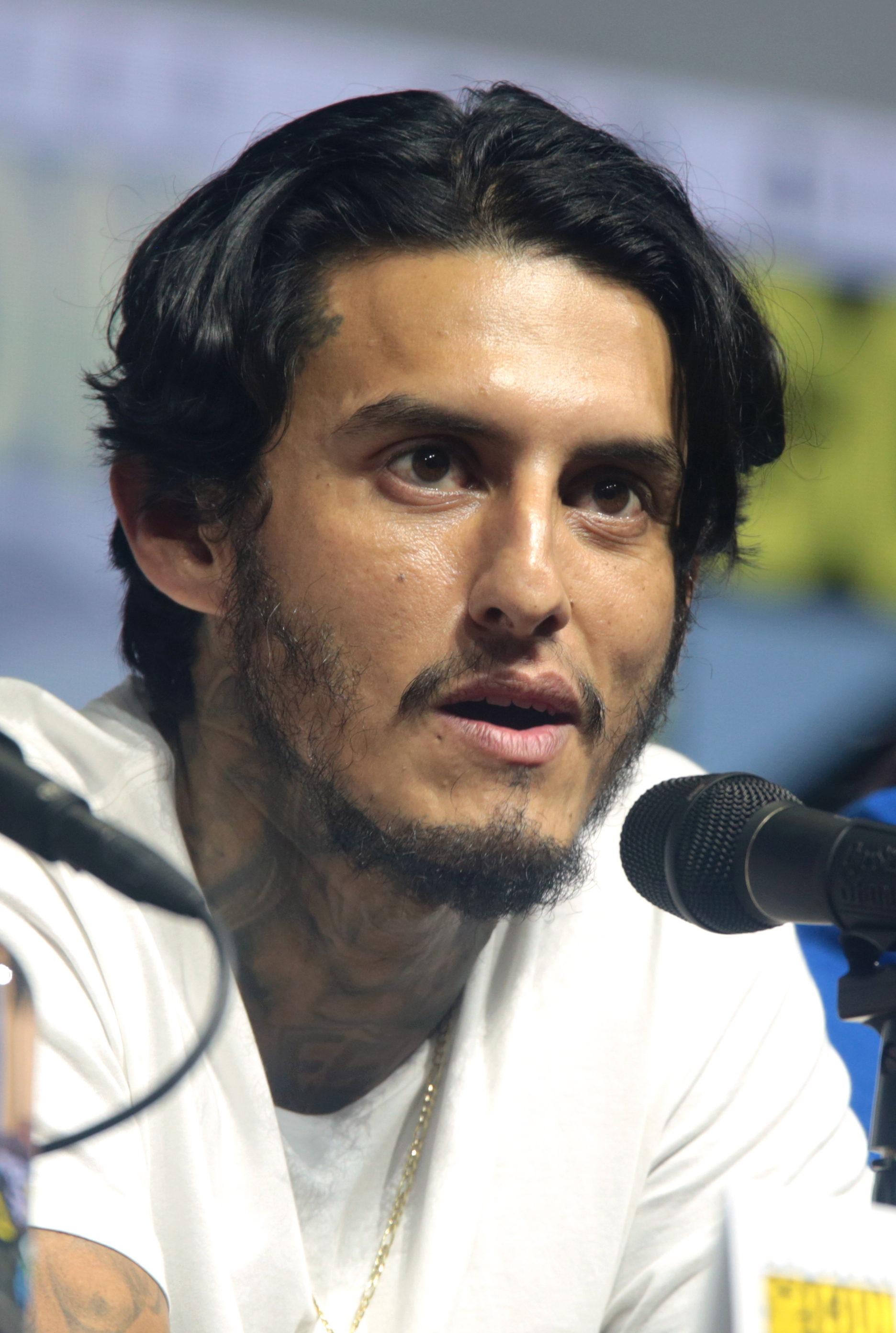
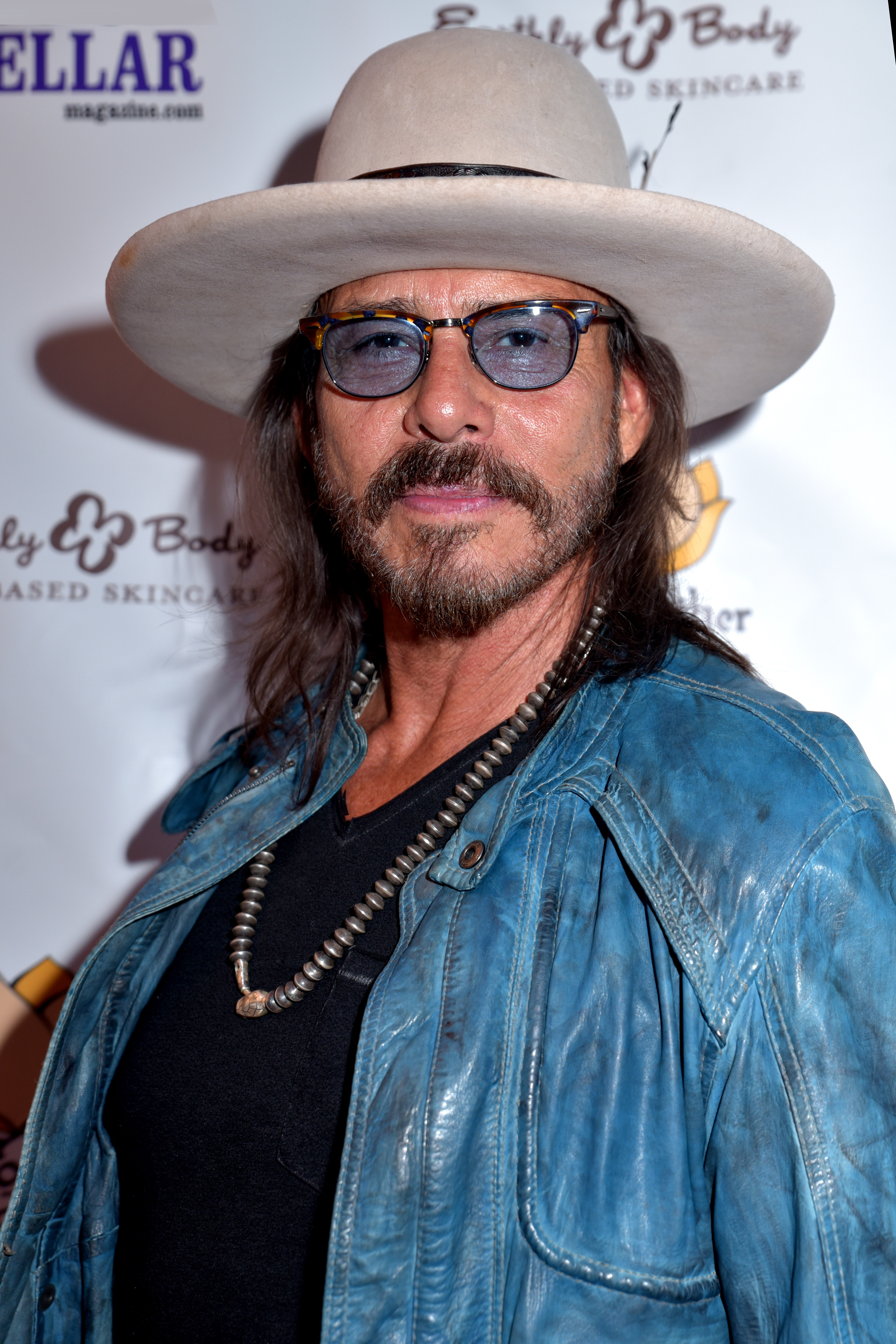
Carla Baratta (Adelita), Richard Cabral (Johnny "El Coco" Cruz), and Raoul Trujillo (Che "Taza" Romero)

=== Main ===
- J. D. Pardo as Ezekiel "EZ" Reyes, a full patch for the Mayans, Santo Padre charter and brother to club member Angel Reyes. He gets promoted to Vice-President and ends the season as President.
- Clayton Cardenas as Angel Reyes, EZ's brother and Él Secretario of Mayans M.C., Santo Padre Charter.
- Sarah Bolger as Emily Thomas, childhood sweetheart of EZ, who is now married to Miguel Galindo, and the mother of their infant son. She has abandoned Miguel after he tried to kill her.
- Michael Irby as Obispo "Bishop" Losa, president of Mayans M.C.'s Santo Padre Charter. He gets demoted to Vice-President after the gun battle in the season premiere, but Alvarez demotes him later in “Self Portrait in a Blue Bathroom”.
- Carla Baratta as Adelita, who as a child, watched her family die at the hands of the Galindo cartel. She has a son with Angel Reyes.
- Richard Cabral as Johnny "El Coco" Cruz, a full patch member of Mayans M.C. who got voted out due to his drug habits in Season 3, but was given another chance and put on probation.
- Raoul Trujillo as Che "Taza" Romero, Vice Presidente of Mayans M.C., Santo Padre Charter, but lost his seat during the four month time jump between the first and second episodes.
- Danny Pino as Miguel Galindo, the son of Galindo Cartel founder Jose Galindo.
- Edward James Olmos as Felipe Reyes, the once-strong Mexican patriarch and Angel and EZ's father.
- Emilio Rivera as Marcus Álvarez, former Consejero to Miguel Galindo, former president of the Mayans M.C. Oakland Charter and national president of the Mayans M.C., cousin of Obispo "Bishop" Losa
- Frankie Loyal as Hank "El Tranq" Loza, a former bare-knuckle brawler and El Pacificador (Sgt-at-Arms) of the Mayans M.C., Santo Padre Charter.
- Joseph Lucero as Neron "Creeper" Vargas, an ex-junkie from Los Angeles and Capitan Del Camino (Road Captain) of the Mayans M.C., Santo Padre Charter.
- Vincent Vargas as Gilberto "Gilly" Lopez, a former U.S. Army Ranger and a good-natured mixed martial arts (MMA) fighter and a full patch member of the Mayans M.C., Santo Padre Charter. He gets put on probation due to being missing - he was rescuing Coco - when the Mayan Civil War happened.

=== Special guests ===
- Manny Montana as Manny, a full patch member of the Mayans M.C., Yuma Charter who befriends EZ.
- Kim Coates as Alex "Tig" Trager, Vice President of SAMCRO, reprising his role from Sons of Anarchy

=== Recurring ===
- Gino Vento as Nestor Oceteva, the head of security for the Galindo Cartel and a childhood friend of Miguel's who later becomes a prospect for the Mayans M.C., Santo Padre Charter.
- Emily Tosta as Leticia "Letty" Cruz, Coco's daughter who was raised by her grandmother Celia for most of her life believing she was his younger sister.
- Jimmy Gonzales as Canche, the Presidente of the Mayans M.C., Yuma Charter and one of the three Kings of the Mayans M.C.
- Vanessa Giselle as Hope, a heroin addict who forms a close relationship with Coco. She is also a member of Isaac's drug community at Meth Mountain.
- Justina Adorno as Stephanie, also known as "Nails", one of the bartenders at the clubhouse of the Mayans M.C., Santo Padre Charter. She later becomes engaged to Angel after a recurring fling with him.
- Grace Rizzo as Jess, one of the bartenders at the clubhouse of the Mayans M.C., Santo Padre Charter whose sister, Jazmine, is close to a member of SAMDINO.
- Patricia de Leon as Diana Alvarez, the wife of Marcus Alvarez who lives in Santo Padre with him and their children. (Note: Previously played by Michelle Diaz in Sons of Anarchy.)
- Holland Roden as Erin Thomas, Emily Galindo's younger sister, who moves to Santo Padre to live with her and reconnect.
- Greg Vrotsos as Terry, the Vice President of SAMDINO who seeks to start a war with the Mayans.
- Guillermo García as Ignacio, more commonly known as "El Banquero" (The Banker), the leader of Lobos Nueva Generación (LNG), a radical organization made up of the remnants of the Lobos Sonora Cartel, who were previously defeated by the Galindo Cartel under Jose Galindo.
- Andrea Cortés as Sofia, an employee at an animal shelter who helps EZ adopt a dog, Sally.
- Stella Maeve as Kody, an ex-junkie who befriends Creeper at an NA meeting.
- Greg Serano as Jay-Jay, an ex-convict who EZ was associated with whilst in prison.
- CM Punk as Paul, a former US Army Ranger and close friend of Gilly.
- Sulem Calderon as Gabriela "Gaby" Castillo, EZ's girlfriend until she leaves him to move to Lodi to attend nursing school.
- Julia Belanova as Sasha, one of the gutter punks who come to Santo Padre looking for Meth Mountain.

=== Guest ===
- Efrat Dor as Anna Linares, a government agent working with Lincoln Potter in the investigation of the Mayans and Los Olvidados.

== Episodes ==
No. overall	No. in season	Title	Directed by	Written by	Original release date	Prod. code	U.S. viewers (millions)
31	1	"Cleansing of the Temple"	Elgin James	Elgin James	April 19, 2022	4WBD01	0.680
32	2	"Hymn Among Ruins"	Elgin James	Debra Moore Muñoz	April 19, 2022	4WBD02	0.562
33	3	"Self Portrait in a Blue Bathroom"	Brett Dos Santos	Gerald Cuesta	April 26, 2022	4WBD03	0.511
34	4	"A Crow Flew By"	Michael D. Olmos	Sara Price	May 3, 2022	4WBD04	0.541
35	5	"Death of the Virgin"	Elgin James	Sean Clayton Varela	May 10, 2022	4WBD05	0.517
36	6	"When I Die, I Want Your Hands on my Eyes"	Melissa Hickey	Elba Román-Morales	May 17, 2022	4WBD06	0.597
37	7	"Dialogue with the Mirror"	Elgin James	Debra Moore Muñoz & Richard Cabral	May 24, 2022	4WBD07	0.632
38	8	"The Righteous Wrath of an Honorable Man"	Danny Pino	Debra Moore Muñoz	May 31, 2022	4WBD08	0.640
39	9	"The Calling of Saint Matthew"	Brett Dos Santos	Gerald Cuesta & Sara Price	June 7, 2022	4WBD09	0.776
40	10	"When the Breakdown Hit at Midnight"	Elgin James	Elgin James & Sean Varela	June 14, 2022	4WBD10	0.619
