= Mayans M.C. season 5 =

American TV show season

Mayans M.C.
- Season 5
- Starring: J. D. Pardo; Clayton Cardenas; Sarah Bolger; Michael Irby; Carla Baratta; Danny Pino; Edward James Olmos; Frankie Loyal; Joseph Lucero; Vincent Vargas; JR Bourne
- No. of episodes: 10

Release
- Original network: FX
- Original release: May 24 – July 19, 2023

Season chronology
- ← Previous; Season 4

The fifth and final season of Mayans M.C., an American crime drama, premiered on FX, on May 24, 2023, and concluded on July 19, 2023; it consisted of ten episodes and aired on Wednesdays in the United States. The series was created by Kurt Sutter and Elgin James, takes place in the same fictional universe as Sons of Anarchy, and focuses on a rival motorcycle club.

== Cast and characters ==
=== Main ===
- J. D. Pardo as Ezekiel "EZ" Reyes, the Presidente of the Mayans, Santo Padre charter and brother to club member Angel Reyes.
- Clayton Cardenas as Angel Reyes, EZ's brother and Él Secretario of Mayans M.C., Santo Padre Charter
- Sarah Bolger as Emily Thomas, childhood sweetheart of EZ, who married Miguel Galindo and had a son with him. She separated from Miguel after he tried to kill her, but was forced to go back to him to avoid losing her son.
- Michael Irby as Obispo "Bishop" Losa, vice-presidente - former Presidente - of Mayans M.C.'s Santo Padre Charter.
- Carla Baratta as Luisa “Adelita” Espina, who as a child, watched her family die at the hands of the Galindo cartel. She has a son with Angel Reyes.
- Danny Pino as Miguel Galindo, the son of Galindo Cartel founder Jose Galindo.
- Edward James Olmos as Felipe Reyes, the once-strong Mexican patriarch and Angel and EZ's father.
- Emilio Rivera as Marcus Álvarez, former Consejero/consigliere to Miguel Galindo, former presidente of both the Mayans M.C. Oakland and Santo Padre Charters, national presidente of the Mayans M.C., and cousin of Obispo "Bishop" Losa. He was voted out of his seat in Santo Padre at the conclusion of Season 4.
- Frankie Loyal as Hank "El Tranq" Loza, a former bare-knuckle brawler and El Pacificador (Sgt-at-Arms) of the Mayans M.C., Santo Padre Charter.
- Joseph Lucero as Neron "Creeper" Vargas, an ex-junkie from Los Angeles and Capitan Del Camino (Road Captain) of the Mayans M.C., Santo Padre Charter.
- Vincent Vargas as Gilberto "Gilly" Lopez, a former U.S. Army Ranger and a good-natured mixed martial arts (MMA) fighter and a full patch member of the Mayans M.C., Santo Padre Charter.
- JR Bourne as Isaac Packer, the President of SAMDINO and a former Nomad who became the leader of a drug community based outside of Santo Padre at an encampment dubbed "Meth Mountain". He was previously ex-communicated from SAMDINO by his older brother and former President, Les Packer due to his unstable nature.

=== Special guests ===
- Ray McKinnon as Lincoln "Linc" James Potter, reprising his role from Sons of Anarchy as an Assistant U.S. Attorney based in California, now investigating both the Mayans M.C. and Los Olvidados.
- Raoul Max Trujillo as Che "Taza" Romero, a former full patch member and Vice Presidente of the Mayans M.C., Santo Padre Charter. He was also a former member of the Vatos Malditos M.C. but left after its president, El Palo, killed his own brother David, with whom Taza was in a secret relationship. He later leaves Santo Padre, choosing to go Nomad.

=== Recurring ===
- Emily Tosta as Leticia "Letty" Cruz, Coco's daughter who was raised by her grandmother Celia for most of her life believing she was his younger sister.
- Loki as Lobo, the former El Pacificador of the Mayans M.C., Tucson Charter. He later patches over to the Sahuarita Charter and again to the Santo Padre Charter.
- Vanessa Giselle as Hope, a heroin addict who starts a relationship with Coco and later becomes close friends with Leticia after getting sober. She is also a former member of Isaac's drug community at Meth Mountain.
- Michael Anthony Perez as Luis, a loyal sicario for the Galindo Cartel and later the LNG Cartel who often acts as extra muscle.
- Grace Rizzo as Jess, one of the bartenders at the clubhouse of the Mayans M.C., Santo Padre Charter who spies on the Mayans for SAMDINO. She is also Jazmine's sister.
- Patricia de Leon as Izzy Alvarez, the wife of Marcus Álvarez who lives in Santo Padre with him and her step-children.
- Greg Vrotsos as Terry Drakos, the Vice President of SAMDINO who seeks to start a war with the Mayans.
- Augie Duke as Treenie Gaeta, the wife of Tommy Gaeta who later becomes a bartender at the clubhouse of the Mayans M.C., Santo Padre Charter and has a casual relationship with Bishop.
- Angel Oquendo as Downer, a full patch member of the Mayans M.C., Yuma Charter who values loyalty to the club above all else. He later patches over to the Santo Padre Charter.
- Andrea Cortés as Sofia, an employee at an animal shelter who helps EZ adopt a dog, Sally, and later starts a relationship with him. In a previous relationship, she had a young daughter whose death she unintentionally caused.
- Stella Maeve as Katie McNeill, also known by the undercover alias "Kody", an ex-junkie who befriends Creeper at an NA meeting as part of a ruse whilst working as an undercover ATF agent.
- Selene Luna as Soledad, the calculative leader of Lobos Nueva Generación Cartel and El Banquero's sister. She seeks to regain her organization's former glory and forms an alliance with rival cartels, Cole's ex-military mercs, the Iron War M.C. and Storm 88.
- CM Punk as Paul, a former US Army Ranger and close friend of Gilly.
- Erica Luttrell as Rae, Gilly's former commanding officer in the U.S. Army Rangers, Paul's wife, and the mother of their son.
- Branton Box as Cole, a dealer in specialized small arms weaponry and a former special forces soldier who leads a group of ex-military mercenaries. He later works with the LNG Cartel as part of an alliance with several criminal factions.
- Presciliana Esparolini as Maggie, Izzy's friend who is set up with Bishop.
- Andrew Jacobs as Guero, a full patch member of the Mayans M.C., Santo Padre Charter after patching over from the disbanded Tucson Charter where his father Ibarra was Presidente.
- Alex Barone as Bottles, a newly recruited prospect for the Mayans M.C., Santo Padre Charter.
- Caitlin Stasey as Johnny Panic, the President of the Broken Saints M.C., an all-female club who are in conflict with the Iron War M.C.
- Dana Delany as Patricia Devlin, the Deputy Assistant Inspector General of the Division of Investigations who investigates Lincoln Potter.
- Luis Fernandez-Gil as Elio, an experienced meth cook working for the LNG Cartel, who is kidnapped and forced to work for the Mayans.

=== Guests ===
- David Labrava as Happy Lowman, reprising his role from Sons of Anarchy as the Sgt-at-Arms of SAMCRO, the founding charter of the Sons of Anarchy M.C. and the former acting President of SAMDINO (Sons of Anarchy Motorcycle Club, San Bernardino Charter). He is later revealed to have killed Marisol Reyes as part of a murder-for-hire contract and also killed the eldest son of Marcus Álvarez, Esai Alvarez, during a previous conflict with SAMCRO.
- Justina Adorno as Stephanie, more commonly known as "Nails", one of the bartenders at the clubhouse of the Mayans M.C., Santo Padre Charter who has a recurring fling with Angel.
- Spenser Granese as Butterfly, a drug dealer and member of Isaac's drug community at Meth Mountain.
- Drea de Matteo as Wendy Case, reprising her role from Sons of Anarchy as Jax Teller's ex-wife and mother of his eldest son Abel

== Production ==
In July 2022, the series was renewed for a fifth season. In January 2023, it was announced the series would end after season five.

== Episodes ==
No. overall	No. in season	Title	Directed by	Written by	Original release date	Prod. code	U.S. viewers (millions)
41	1	"I Hear the Train A-Comin"	Elgin James	Elgin James	May 24, 2023	5WBD01	0.560
42	2	"Lord Help My Poor Soul"	Brett Dos Santos	Jenny Lynn	May 24, 2023	5WBD02	0.406
43	3	"Do You Hear the Rain"	Danny Pino	Vivian Tse	May 31, 2023	5WBD03	0.399
44	4	"I See the Black Light"	J. D. Pardo	Meredith Danluck	June 7, 2023	5WBD04	0.400
45	5	"I Want Nothing but Death"	Elgin James	Sean Varela	June 14, 2023	5WBD05	0.419
46	6	"My Eyes Filled and Then Closed on the Last of Childhood Tears"	Allison Anders	Miriam Hernandez	June 21, 2023	5WBD06	0.454
47	7	"To Fear of Death, I Eat the Stars"	Elgin James	Vivian Tse	June 28, 2023	5WBD07	0.494
48	8	"Her Blacks Crackle and Drag"	Brett Dos Santos	Sean Varela & Vincent Vargas	July 5, 2023	5WBD08	0.529
49	9	"I Must Go in Now for the Fog Is Rising"	Elgin James	Jenny Lynn	July 12, 2023	5WBD09	0.524
50	10	"Slow to Bleed Fair Son"	Elgin James	Elgin James & Sean Varela	July 19, 2023	5WBD10	0.491
