= Diana Gameros =

Mexican singer-songwriter

Diana Gameros is a Mexican-born singer-songwriter from Ciudad Juarez.

== Biography ==
Gameros moved to the United States at the age of 13, where she experienced an extended period of displacement as an undocumented immigrant living with her aunt in Michigan. Formally educated in piano and recording technology, Gameros' formative years were also shaped by the music and stories of fellow immigrants.

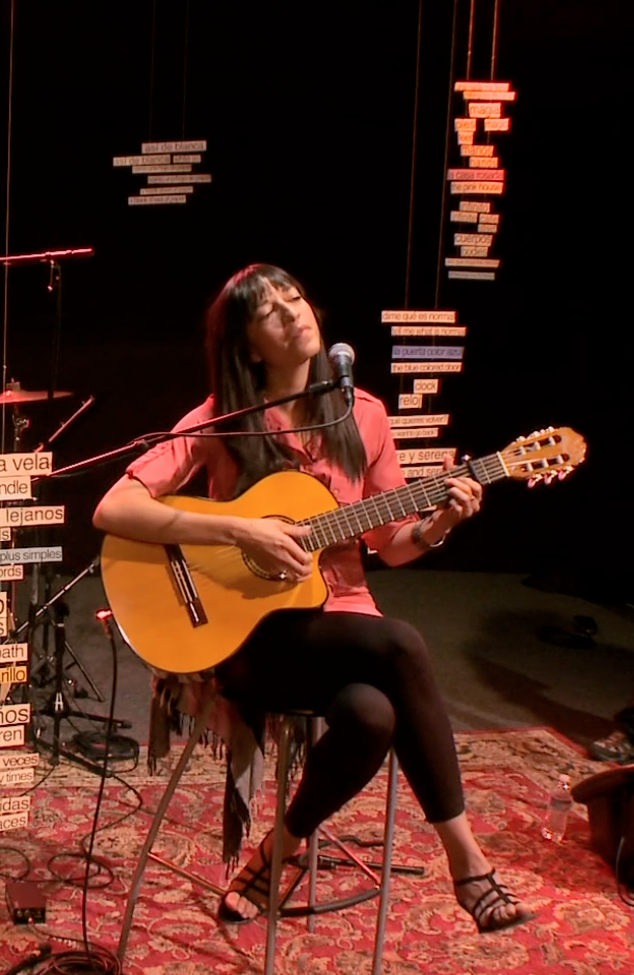
Diana Gameros performs live at BAMM.tv in San Francisco in 2013.

In 2017, Gameros performed her song "¿Como Hacer?" for NPR's Tiny Desk Contest, which documents the challenges she faced in being unable to return to Mexico for over 15 years.

Gameros later moved to San Francisco and has performed at music venues such as the Herbst Theater, Fox Theater, SFJAZZ Center, The Oakland Symphony, Brava Theater and The Independent. Her work has been featured on NPR's Alt.Latino and KQED.
