= Salvador Chacón =

American film director (born 1984)

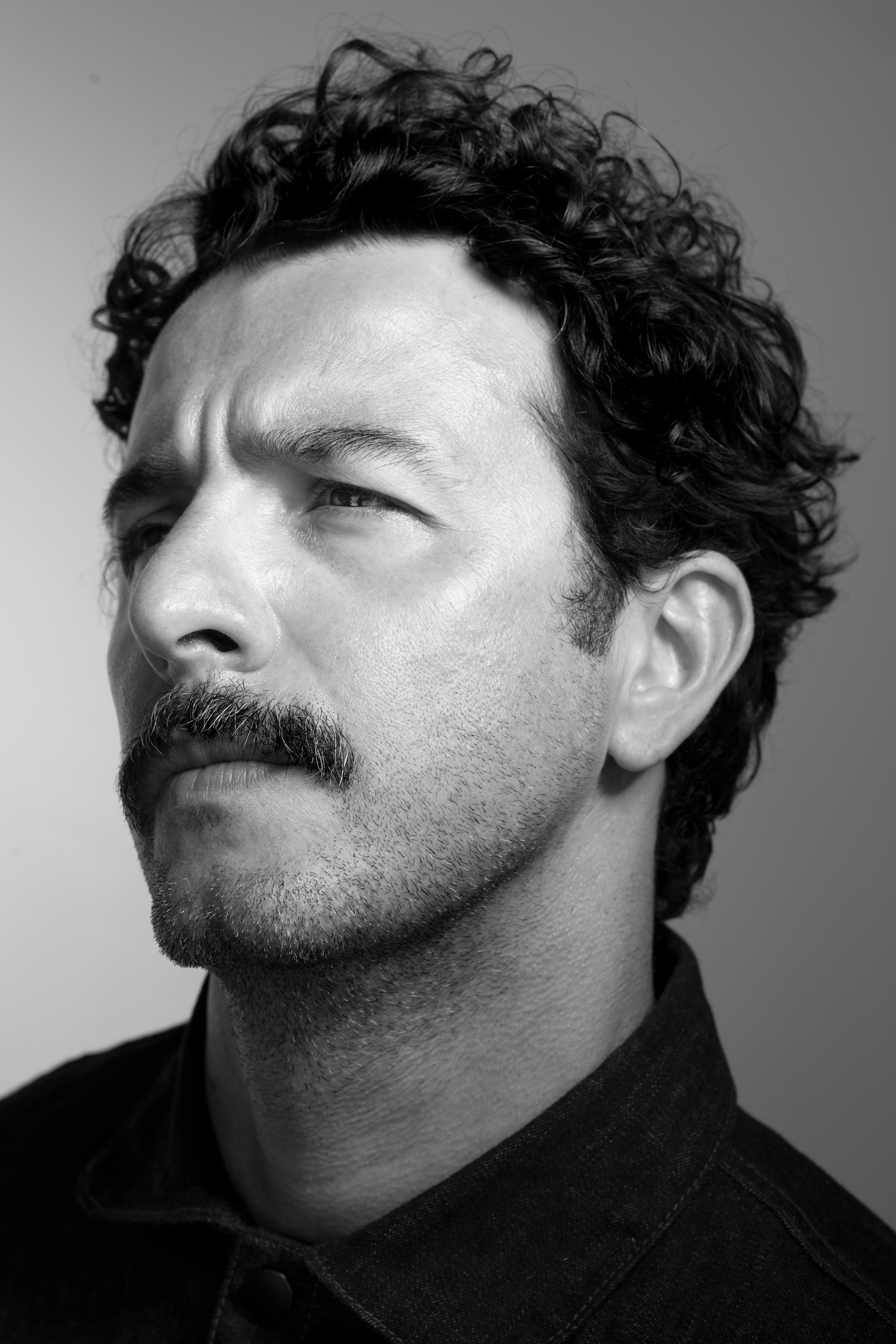
Salvador Chacon

Salvador Chacón (born September 2, 1984) is a Mexican-American actor, producer and director. He stars as Gerardo Ortiz-Niño in Apple TV's space series For All Mankind. Additionally he's is widely recognized for his role as Pablo in the FX original series Mayans M.C.. He has appeared in Blackish, NCIS and The Chi amongst others. He is a founder and executive producer at Wild Goats Creative and he is part of the director duo "Los Chacon" together with his sibling, photographer Aldo Chacon.

== Early life ==
Salvador Alfonso Gutiérrez Chacón a.k.a. Salvador Chacón was born in Mexico D.F. on September 2, 1984. He grew up between Mexico City and Cuernavaca Morelos and later moved to the U.S. to pursue a Drama degree at The University of Texas Pan-American. After graduating, he worked multiple jobs in film and Television before making the move to Los Angeles to focus on acting.

== Career ==
After moving to Los Angeles, Salvador started to work in advertising and commercials appearing in national and international campaigns for many American brands. He portrayed the spokesperson for Nissan North American Hispanic market. Parallel to his commercial work he began to take roles in short films and web series that eventually led him to land roles in television shows such as NCIS and later Mayans M.C. and The Chi. Alongside his acting career, Chacón works as an Executive Producer for his company Wild Goats Creative.

== Personal life ==
Chacón resides in Los Angeles and often visits and works in Mexico City.

== Filmography ==
=== Film ===
Year	Title	Role	Notes
2011	Breaking Cover	Hernandez	Short Film
2013	How To Forget	Him	Short Film
2014	Obsession	Enrique	Short Film
2015	Navidad	Pedro	Short Film
2016	Aztec Warrior	Aztec Warriror	Voice
2018	Wind In the Night	Guillermo	Short Film
2018	Bad Labor	Roberto Vargas	Feature Film
2018	Jesse James	James	Short Film
2019	Sanzu	Caron	Short Film
2022	Dark Blue	Gael	Short Film
2022	The Summoned	Joe Agrippa	Feature Film
2024	Mateo	Mateo	Short Film

=== Television ===
Year	Title	Role	Notes
2012	Awkward Sunrise	Lost In Translation Guy	Lost In Translation
2014	Sissel With Sassel	Sassel	Main Cast
2015	Ex-Best	Josh	3 episodes
2017	The Get	The Latino	TV movie
2017	NCIS	"A-Hole" Guard	Episode: "House Divided"
2020	The Chi	Tomas Gutierrez	3 episodes
2018–2021	Mayans M.C.	Pablo	13 episodes
2022	Black-ish	Jorge	1 episode
2023–present	For All Mankind	Gerardo Ortiz-Niño	19 episodes

=== Podcasts ===
Year	Title	Role	Notes
2021	Wolverine: La Larga Noche	The Hunter/Brent	2 Episodes
2025	Murder In Montecito	Pablo	7 Episodes

=== Commercials ===
Over 50 National and International spots, print and digital campaigns, including the spokesperson role for Nissan North American Hispanic market.
