= Angel Oquendo =

American actor

- Born: The Bronx, New York, U.S.
- Occupations: Actor; Voice Actor; Writer; Producer
- Years active: 2001-present

Angel Oquendo is an American film, television and voice-over actor. In addition to his work on film, he's appeared in a number of television series including Mayans M.C., 9-1-1: Lone Star, Animal Kingdom, and Everybody Hates Chris.

== Filmography ==
=== Film ===
Year	Title	Role	Notes
2005	Shadowboxer	Lamar	
2007	King of California	Younger Cop	
2007	Ocean's Thirteen	Gerard Ortega	
2007	1408	Taxi Cab Driver	
2008	Vacancy 2: The First Cut	Deputy #3	
2008	Haunted Echoes	Male Nurse	
2009	The Slammin' Salmon	Hispanic Customer	Uncredited
2009	Post Grad	Police Officer	
2012	The Misadventures of the Dunderheads	Panicky Richard	
2017	Cars 3	Bobby Swift	Uncredited
2023	Chang Can Dunk	Coach	

=== Television ===
Year	Title	Role	Notes
2001	America's Most Wanted	Hugo Magan	Episode: "Catalino Morales"
2003	Hack	Security Guard	2 episodes
2004	The FBI Files	Oscar Cisneros	Episode: "Dangerous Gamble"
2006	Monk	Garage Attendant	Episode: "Mr. Monk and the Actor"
2006	What About Brian	Technician	Episode: "What About Second Chances"
2006	Bones	Nurse	Episode: "The Headless Witch in the Woods"
2006	ER	Thigh Patient	Episode: "Tell Me No Secrets..."
2007	My Name Is Earl	Prison Medic	Episode: "My Name Is Inmate #28301-016: Part 2"
2008	Nip/Tuck	Oscar Aureilles	Episode: "Magda and Jeff"
2008–2009	Raising the Bar	Carlos	7 episodes
2009	CSI: Miami	Criminal	Episode: "Head Case"
2009	Everybody Hates Chris	Miguel Rodriguez	Episode: "Everybody Hates the Car"
2009	Fear Clinic	Garcia	5 episodes
2010	Dexter	FBI Handler	Episode: "Beauty And The Beast"
2010–2012	House	EMT Coumont	3 episodes
2011	The Mentalist	Jorge Velasquez	Episode: "Like a Redheaded Stepchild"
2011	Law & Order: LA	Edie Ramos	Episode: "El Sereno"
2013	Legit	Man in the Aisle Seat	Episode: "Anger"
2013	Cougar Town	Concierge	Episode: "Have Love Will Travel"
2013	Bloomers	ER Doctor	Episode: "What on Earth Are We Doing Here?"
2014	Enlisted	Angry MP	Episode: "Pilot"
2014	Major Crimes	David, Ice Cream Vendor	Episode: "Two Options"
2020	The Baker and the Beauty	MPD Officer 3	Episode: "Blow Out"
2021	Dave	Mr. Santos	Episode: "Dave"
2022	9-1-1: Lone Star	Manuel	3 episodes
2022-2023	Mayans M.C.	Downer	15 episodes
2022	Animal Kingdom	Jenkins	Episode: "1992"
