= Mayans M.C. =

American crime drama television series

- Genre: Crime drama
- Created by: Kurt Sutter; Elgin James
- Showrunners: Kurt Sutter (seasons 1–2); Elgin James
- Starring: J. D. Pardo; Clayton Cardenas; Sarah Bolger; Michael Irby; Carla Baratta; Richard Cabral; Raoul Max Trujillo; Manny Montana; Antonio Jaramillo; Danny Pino; Edward James Olmos; Emilio Rivera; Sulem Calderon; Frankie Loyal; Joseph Raymond Lucero; Vincent Vargas; JR Bourne
- Theme music composer: Kurt Sutter; Bob Thiele Jr.
- Opening theme: "Nunca" by David Hidalgo & Los Refugio Tiernos (seasons 1–2) "Nunca" by Diana Gameros (season 2)
- Composers: Bob Thiele Jr. (seasons 1–2); David Wingo (seasons 3–5)
- Country of origin: United States
- Original languages: English; Spanish
- No. of seasons: 5
- No. of episodes: 50

Production
- Executive producers: Elgin James; Kurt Sutter; Norberto Barba (season 1); Kevin Dowling (season 2); Michael Dinner (season 3); Hilton Smith (season 4)
- Producer: Jon Paré
- Cinematography: Itai Neʼeman; Lisa Wiegand
- Editors: Hunter M. Via; Paul Fontaine
- Camera setup: Single-camera
- Running time: 46–82 minutes
- Production companies: Sutter Ink; 20th Television (Note: Known as Fox 21 Television Studios for season 1 and Touchstone Television for season 2); FXP

Original release
- Network: FX
- Release: September 4, 2018 – July 19, 2023

Related
- Sons of Anarchy

Mayans M.C. (also known simply as Mayans) is an American crime drama television series created by Kurt Sutter and Elgin James, that premiered on September 4, 2018, on FX. The show takes place in the same fictional universe as Sons of Anarchy and deals with the Sons' rivals-turned-allies, the Mayans Motorcycle Club.

The series's fourth season premiered on April 19, 2022. In July 2022, the series was renewed for a fifth and final season, which premiered on May 24, 2023, with the series finale airing on July 19, 2023.

== Premise ==
Mayans M.C. takes place two-and-a-half years after the events of Sons of Anarchy and is set hundreds of miles away in the fictional California border town of Santo Padre. The series focuses on the struggles of Ezekiel "EZ" Reyes, a prospect in the charter of the Mayans M.C. based on the U.S.–Mexico border. EZ is the gifted son of a proud Mexican family, whose American dream was snuffed out by cartel violence. Now, his need for vengeance drives him toward a life he never intended and can never escape.

== Cast and characters ==
=== Main ===
- J. D. Pardo as Ezekiel "EZ" Reyes, a prospect at the beginning of the series, promoted to Vice Presidente then Presidente of the Mayans M.C., Santo Padre Charter. He joined the club following his release from prison. He is the younger brother of fellow club member Angel Reyes, who sponsored him during his time as a prospect, and is the son of Felipe and Marisol Reyes.
- Clayton Cardenas as Angel Reyes, a full patch member and later El Secretario (Secretary) of the Mayans M.C., Santo Padre Charter. He is the older brother of EZ and the son of Felipe and Marisol.
- Sarah Bolger as Emily Galindo (née Thomas), EZ's former childhood sweetheart, now the wife of Miguel Galindo and the mother of their son, Cristóbal Galindo II, who is named after Miguel's deceased brother. She is also the older sister of Erin Thomas.
- Michael Irby as Obispo "Bishop" Losa, the former Presidente and Vice Presidente of the Mayans M.C., Santo Padre Charter. He is one of the three Kings of the Mayans M.C. and cousins with its founder Marcus Alvarez. He had a young son with Antonia Pena, Aidan Losa, whose death from a car accident continues to haunt him.
- Carla Baratta as Luisa "Adelita" Espina, who as a child watched her family die at the hands of the Galindo Cartel. She is the former leader of Los Olvidados (The Forgotten Ones), a group of Mexican rebels who are devoted to fighting the Galindo Cartel.
- Richard Cabral as Johnny "El Coco" Cruz (seasons 1–4), a former Marine sniper and a full patch member of the Mayans M.C., Santo Padre Charter. He is the father of Leticia Cruz and the son of Celia.
- Raoul Max Trujillo (Note: Credited as 'special guest star' for season 5 only.) as Che "Taza" Romero (seasons 1–4; guest season 5), a former Vice Presidente of the Mayans M.C., Santo Padre Charter. He was also a former member of the Vatos Malditos M.C. but left after its president, El Palo, killed his own brother David, with whom Taza was in a secret relationship.
- Antonio Jaramillo as Michael "Riz" Ariza (seasons 1–2), a Santo Padre local and Él Secretario of the Mayans M.C., Santo Padre Charter. He is also the nephew of Vicki Ariza.
- Danny Pino as Miguel Galindo, the former leader of the Galindo Cartel, a Mexican drug cartel, who took over leadership following the death of his father, and cartel founder, Jose Galindo. He's the husband of Emily, the father of their son Cristóbal, the son of Jose's widow Dita Galindo and the biological son of Felipe Reyes.
- Edward James Olmos as Felipe Reyes, born Ignacio Cortina, a once-strong Mexican patriarch who owns a butcher shop in Santo Padre. He is the father of Angel and EZ through his deceased wife Marisol and is later revealed as the biological father of Miguel through his former lover, Dita.
- Emilio Rivera (Note: Credited as 'special guest star' for season 1 only.) as Marcus Álvarez (seasons 2–5; recurring season 1), reprising his role from Sons of Anarchy as the former national Presidente, or El Padrino (The Godfather), of the Mayans M.C. and formerly of its Oakland Charter, the founding charter of the Mayans M.C. Prior to his departure from the Mayans, he chose three Kings to replace him to oversee the future of the club, including his cousin Bishop. He then served as the Galindo Cartel consejero, where he advised its leader Miguel.
- Sulem Calderon as Gabriela "Gaby" Castillo (season 3; guest seasons 2, 4), newly immigrated to the U.S. from Oaxaca, Mexico, she seeks to build a brighter future for herself and her family.
- Frankie Loyal as Hank "El Tranq" Loza (seasons 4–5; recurring seasons 1–3), a kind-hearted former bare-knuckle brawler and El Pacificador (Sgt-at-Arms) of the Mayans M.C., Santo Padre Charter.
- Joseph Raymond Lucero as Neron "Creeper" Vargas (seasons 4–5; recurring seasons 1–3), an ex-junkie from Los Angeles and a full patch member of the Mayans M.C., Santo Padre Charter and its former Capitan Del Camino (Road Captain).
- Vincent Vargas as Gilberto "Gilly" Lopez (seasons 4–5; recurring seasons 1–3), a good-natured mixed martial arts (MMA) fighter, former U.S. Army Ranger, and a full patch member and later Capitan Del Camino of the Mayans M.C., Santo Padre Charter
- JR Bourne as Isaac Packer (season 5; recurring season 3; guest season 4), the President of SAMDINO (Sons of Anarchy Motorcycle Club, San Bernardino Charter) and a former Nomad who became the leader of a drug community based outside of Santo Padre at an encampment dubbed "Meth Mountain". He was previously ex-communicated from SAMDINO by his older brother and former President, Les Packer, due to his unstable nature.

=== Recurring ===
- Tony Plana as Devante Cano (season 1), the Galindo Cartel consejero who loyally served Jose Galindo and mentors his successor Miguel.
- Ada Maris as Dita Galindo (Note: Appears briefly during a flashback in season 3.) (seasons 1–2; guest season 3), Miguel's mother and Jose's widow. She also has a history with Felipe Reyes, her former lover.
- Gino Vento as Nestor Oceteva, the former head of security for the Galindo Cartel and a childhood friend of Miguel's. He later becomes a prospect, sponsored by Marcus, for the Mayans M.C., Santo Padre Charter.
- Joe Ordaz as Paco (seasons 1–2; guest season 3), Miguel's personal driver and a member of the Galindo Cartel.
- Maurice Compte (Note: Appears briefly via an uncredited vocal performance in season 5.) as Kevin Jimenez (season 1), a highly regarded DEA agent who makes it his personal mission to take down the Galindo Cartel.
- Curtiss Cook as Larry Bowen (season 1), a DEA agent who works with Kevin on taking down the Galindo Cartel.
- Salvador Chacón as Pablo (seasons 1–3), the second-in-command of Los Olvidados who serves as Adelita's right-hand man.
- Melony Ochoa as Mini (seasons 1–3; guest season 5), also known as "La Ratona" (The Mouse), a child member of Los Olvidados who has a close relationship with Adelita.
- Daniel Faraldo as Father Rodrigo (season 1), a Christian priest who preaches in Santo Padre and is an old friend of Felipe. He also has a history with Adelita's father, Pedro Espina.
- Alexandra Barreto as Antonia Peña (seasons 1–3), the mayor of Santo Padre and Katrina's wife. She is a former lover of Bishop and the mother of their deceased son, Aidan Losa.
- Michael Ornstein as Chuck "Chucky" Marstein (seasons 1–2), reprising his role from Sons of Anarchy, who now works at a junkyard in Santo Padre for the Mayans M.C. He is later stated to have moved to Ohio.
- Ada Luz Pla as Celia (season 1; guest season 3), Coco's manipulative mother who works as a prostitute and raised her granddaughter Leticia Cruz as her own.
- Emily Tosta as Leticia "Letty" Cruz, Coco's daughter who was raised by her grandmother Celia for most of her life believing she was his younger sister.
- Edwin Hodge as Franky Rogan (seasons 1–2; guest season 3), a police officer in the Santo Padre Police Department who is friendly with the Mayans.
- Ray McKinnon (Note: Credited as 'special guest star' for all appearances.) as Lincoln "Linc" James Potter (seasons 1–2, 5; guest seasons 3–4), reprising his role from Sons of Anarchy as an Assistant U.S. Attorney based in California, now investigating both the Mayans M.C. and Los Olvidados.
- David Labrava as Happy Lowman (season 2; guest seasons 1, 3, 5), reprising his role from Sons of Anarchy as the Sargeant-at-Arms of SAMCRO (Sons of Anarchy Motorcycle Club, Redwood Originals), the founding charter of the Sons of Anarchy M.C. He is later revealed to have killed Marisol Reyes as part of a murder-for-hire contract and also killed the eldest son of Marcus Alvarez, Esai Alvarez, during a previous conflict with SAMCRO.
- Ivo Nandi as Oscar "El Oso" Ramos (seasons 2–3), reprising his role from Sons of Anarchy as the Presidente of the Mayans M.C., Stockton Charter and one of the three Kings of the Mayans M.C.
- Jimmy Gonzales as Canche (seasons 2–4), the Presidente of the Mayans M.C., Yuma Charter and one of the three Kings of the Mayans M.C.
- Mía Maestro as Sederica Palomo (seasons 2–3), the governor of Baja California who works with Miguel Galindo in secret.
- Efrat Dor (Note: Dor was previously cast as Katrina in the series' original pilot episode.) as Anna Linares (seasons 2–3; guest season 4), a government agent working with Lincoln Potter in the investigation of the Mayans M.C. and Los Olvidados.
- Mikal Vega as Hobart (season 2), a mercenary squad leader hired by Lincoln Potter to destroy Los Olvidados.
- Malaya Rivera Drew as Ileana (season 2), an old friend of Emily now working for the Santo Padre city council.
- Mike Beltran as Ibarra (season 3; guest season 2), the Presidente of the Mayans M.C., Tucson Charter and a close ally of the Santo Padre charter.
- Loki as Lobo (seasons 3–5; guest season 2), the former El Pacificador of the Mayans M.C., Tucson Charter. He later patches over to the Sahuarita Charter and again to the Santo Padre Charter.
- Vanessa Giselle as Hope (seasons 3–5; guest season 2), a heroin addict who starts a relationship with Coco and later becomes close friends with Leticia after getting sober. She is also a former member of Isaac's drug community at Meth Mountain.
- Michael Anthony Perez as Luis (seasons 3–5; guest season 2), a loyal sicario for the Galindo Cartel and later the LNG Cartel who often acts as extra muscle.
- Gregory Cruz as El Palo (season 3; guest season 2), El Unico (The One, aka President) of the Vatos Malditos M.C., who make their money through human trafficking and recruit members without the prospecting process. After the disbandment of his club, he later patches over to the Mayans M.C., Yuma Charter. He is also the brother of Laura.
- Momo Rodriguez as Esteban "Steve" Estrada (season 3), a former prospect, sponsored by Hank, and later a full patch member of the Mayans M.C., Santo Padre Charter, who's dreamed of joining a M.C. his whole life.
- Justina Adorno as Stephanie (seasons 3–4; guest season 5), more commonly known as "Nails", one of the bartenders at the clubhouse of the Mayans M.C., Santo Padre Charter who has a recurring fling with Angel.
- Grace Rizzo as Jess (seasons 3–5), one of the bartenders at the clubhouse of the Mayans M.C., Santo Padre Charter who spies on the Mayans for SAMDINO. She is also Jazmine's sister.
- Holland Roden as Erin Thomas (season 3; guest season 4), Emily Galindo's younger sister, who moves to Santo Padre to live with her and reconnect.
- Patricia de Leon as Izzy Alvarez (seasons 3–5), the wife of Marcus Alvarez who lives in Santo Padre with him and her step-children.
- Spenser Granese as Butterfly (season 3; guest season 5), a drug dealer and member of Isaac's drug community at Meth Mountain.
- Natalia Cordova-Buckley as Laura (season 3), El Palo's sister, who is distant from him for killing their brother.
- Greg Vrotsos as Terry Drakos (seasons 4–5; guest season 3), the Vice President of SAMDINO who seeks to start a war with the Mayans.
- Guillermo García as Ignacio (season 4; guest season 3), more commonly known as "El Banquero" (The Banker), the unstable leader of the Lobos Nueva Generación Cartel (LNG), a radical criminal organization made up of the remnants of the Lobos Sonora Cartel, who were previously defeated by the Galindo Cartel under Jose Galindo. He is also the brother of Soledad.
- Augie Duke as Treenie Gaeta (seasons 4–5; guest season 3), the wife of Tommy Gaeta who later becomes a bartender at the clubhouse of the Mayans M.C., Santo Padre Charter and has a casual relationship with Bishop.
- Manny Montana as Manny (season 4), an up-and-coming full patch member and later Vice Presidente of the Mayans M.C., Yuma Charter who befriends EZ and shares his ideals for the future of the Mayans.
- Angel Oquendo as Downer (seasons 4–5), a full patch member of the Mayans M.C., Yuma Charter who values loyalty to the club above all else. He later patches over to the Santo Padre Charter.
- Andrea Cortés as Sofia (seasons 4–5), an employee at an animal shelter who helps EZ adopt a dog, Sally, and later starts a relationship with him. In a previous relationship, she had a young daughter whose death she unintentionally caused.
- Stella Maeve as Katie McNeill (seasons 4–5), also known by the undercover alias "Kody", an ex-junkie who befriends Creeper at an NA meeting as part of a ruse whilst working as an undercover ATF agent.
- Greg Serano as Jay-Jay (season 4), an ex-convict who EZ was associated with whilst in prison.
- Selene Luna as Soledad (seasons 4–5), the calculative leader of Lobos Nueva Generación Cartel and El Banquero's sister who seeks to regain her organization's former glory and take control of the drug trade.
- Erica Luttrell as Rae (seasons 4–5), Gilly's former commanding officer in the U.S. Army Rangers, Paul's wife, and the mother of their son.
- Presciliana Esparolini as Maggie (season 5; guest season 4), Izzy's friend who is set up with Bishop.
- Andrew Jacobs as Guero (season 5), a full patch member of the Mayans M.C., Santo Padre Charter after patching over from the disbanded Tucson Charter where his father Ibarra was Presidente.
- Alex Barone as Bottles (season 5), a newly recruited prospect for the Mayans M.C., Santo Padre Charter.
- Caitlin Stasey as Johnny Panic (season 5), the President of the Broken Saints M.C., an all-female club which is in conflict with the Iron War M.C.
- Lauren McKnight as Chip (season 5), the Vice President of the Broken Saints M.C.
- Dana Delany as Patricia Devlin (season 5), the Deputy Assistant Inspector General of the Division of Investigations who investigates Lincoln Potter.
- Luis Fernandez-Gil as Elio (season 5), an experienced meth cook working for the LNG Cartel, who is kidnapped and forced to work for the Mayans.

=== Guest ===
- Robert Patrick as Les Packer (seasons 1–2), reprising his role from Sons of Anarchy as the President of SAMDINO until he is later forced to retire after being diagnosed with cancer. He is also the older brother of fellow SAMDINO member Isaac, who he previously ex-communicated from the club.
- Emiliano Torres as Dondo (seasons 1–4), the former Vice Presidente and later Presidente of the Mayans M.C., Stockton Charter.
- Peter Tuiasosopo as Afa Lefiti (season 1), the leader of the Basetown Tribe, a Samoan American street gang based in San Bernardino.
- Monica Estrada as Maria (seasons 1–3, 5), a housekeeper who works for Miguel Galindo, often looking after his son Cristóbal and caring for his mother Dita.
- Katey Sagal (Note: Uncredited appearance. Serves as a cameo.) as Gemma Teller Morrow (season 1), reprising her role from Sons of Anarchy during a flashback as the matriarch of SAMCRO.
- Noel G. as Louie, a member of the Dogwood Crew, a Mexican street gang based in Santo Padre, who specialises in selling information on other criminals.
- Diego Olmedo as Andres (season 1), a child member of Los Olvidados who acts as a mole for the Galindo Cartel.
- Branton Box as Cole (seasons 1, 5), a dealer in specialized small arms weaponry and a former special forces soldier who leads a group of ex-military mercenaries.
- Elpidia Carrillo as Victoria "Vicki" Ariza (seasons 1–3), Riz's aunt and the owner of a discreet brothel outside Santo Padre which secretly hides a tunnel that goes under the Mexico-U.S. border.
- Rusty Coones as Rane Quinn (seasons 1–2, 5), reprising his role from Sons of Anarchy as a full patch member of SAMCRO.
- Ray Nicholson as Hallorann (seasons 1–2), a prospect for SAMCRO who is sponsored by Happy.
- Wilson Ramirez as Solis (seasons 2–3, 5), the Presidente of the Mayans M.C., Sahuarita Charter.
- Roel Navarro (Note: Navarro receives an In Memorium plaque at the end of the episode Cleansing of the Temple following his death in 2021.) as Pavia (seasons 2–3), the Vice Presidente of the Mayans M.C., Tucson Charter.
- Yvonne Valadez as Marisol Reyes (seasons 2–3), the deceased mother of Angel & EZ Reyes and the wife of Felipe Reyes. She was killed by Happy Lowman after a murder-for-hire contract was placed on her and Felipe by Dita Galindo out of jealousy. She only appears through flashbacks.
- John Pirruccello as O'Grady (seasons 2–3), a corrupt detective in the Stockton Police Department who works with the Mayans M.C., Stockton Charter.
- David Clayton Rogers as Marlon Buksar (season 2), a Sando Padre city clerk who actively works against Emily and her city projects.
- Kikéy Castillo as Dr. Luna (seasons 2–3), the therapist of Dita Galindo in Santo Padre.
- Elizabeth Frances as Katrina (seasons 2–3), the wife of Santo Padre mayor Antonia Pena.
- Tommy Flanagan as Filip "Chibs" Telford (season 2), reprising his role from Sons of Anarchy as the President of SAMCRO.
- Jacob Vargas as Allesandro "Domingo" Montez (seasons 2–3), reprising his role from Sons of Anarchy as the Road Captain of SAMCRO. He is also loosely affiliated with El Palo and the Vatos Malditos M.C. and is the cousin of Tommy Montez, a fellow member of SAMCRO, and investigates his disappearance.
- Hector Verdugo as Otero (seasons 3–5), the former Vice Presidente and later Presidente of the Mayans M.C., Yuma Charter.
- Mia Danelle as Cielo (seasons 3–5), one of the bartenders at the clubhouse of the Mayans M.C., Santo Padre Charter.
- Joy Dai as Rosa (seasons 3–4), one of the bartenders at the clubhouse of the Mayans M.C., Santo Padre Charter.
- Denise G. Sanchez as Alicia (season 3), a single mother who works with the Mayans M.C., Santo Padre Charter to earn money.
- Judah Benjamin & Obadiah Abel as Cristóbal Galindo II (Note: Previously played by uncredited infant actors in seasons 1–2.) (seasons 3–5), the young son of Miguel and Emily Galindo.
- Keong Sim as Juan Denver (season 3), a drug smuggler for the Galindo Cartel who listens to and quotes John Denver songs.
- Christian Vera as Sirena (seasons 3–5), a machete-wielding lieutenant of the LNG Cartel loyal to Soledad.
- Anton Narinskiy as Jameson (seasons 3–5), an enforcer for the LNG Cartel.
- Alex Fernandez as Diaz (seasons 3–5), a founding member and Presidente of the Mayans M.C., Oakland Charter, taking over from Marcus Alvarez.
- Giovanni Rodriguez as Jinx (seasons 3, 5), the Vice Presidente of the Mayans M.C., Oakland Charter.
- Chad Guerrero as Tommy Gaeta (season 3), a full patch member of the Mayans M.C., Stockton Charter.
- Christine Avila as Consuela Loza (seasons 3, 5), Hank's elderly mother who is suffering from the early stages of dementia.
- Fabian Alomar as Rooster (seasons 3–5), the Presidente of the Mayans M.C., Portland Charter.
- Julio Cesar Ruiz as Tex (season 4), a full patch member of the Mayans M.C., Oakland Charter.
- Justin Huen as Hector (seasons 4–5), a full patch member of the Mayans M.C., Stockton Charter who is later made Presidente of the newly created Inland Empire Charter.
- Bruce Robert Cole as Thomas "Doc" Harper (season 4), the acting President of SAMDINO, who takes over from Les Packer after he's diagnosed with cancer.
- Dakota Daulby as Joker (seasons 4–5), a young and reckless full patch member of SAMDINO loyal to Terry.
- Timothy Showalter as Hoosier (seasons 4–5), a full patch member of SAMDINO loyal to Terry.
- Zhaleh Vossough as Jazmine (seasons 4–5), Jess' sister and Terry's girlfriend.
- Lex Medlin as Randall (season 4), an accountant who handles the finances of the LNG Cartel and is on the run from the U.S. government.
- Renée Victor as Sister Teresa (season 4), Miguel's maternal aunt who lives in a secluded convent in Mexico.
- Phil Brooks as Paul (seasons 4–5), a former U.S. Army Ranger and close friend of Gilly who suffers from suicidal thoughts, Rae's husband and the father of their son.
- Maverick James as Maverick Reyes (Note: Previously played by uncredited infant actors in seasons 2–3.) (seasons 4–5), the young son of Angel Reyes and Adelita.
- Carla Gallo as Melissa Lyndecker (seasons 4–5), an ATF special agent and Katie's superior.
- Kim Coates as Alexander "Tig" Trager (season 4), reprising his role from Sons of Anarchy as the Vice President of SAMCRO.
- Ian Down as Christopher "Slim" Miller (season 5), an incarcerated member of Storm 88, an Aryan Brotherhood gang.
- Shaun Benson as McKenzie (season 5), the President of the Iron War M.C., a club made up of corrupt police officers and prison guards.
- Michael Olavson as Stone (season 5), the Vice President of the Iron War M.C., who was given a facial scar by the Broken Saints.
- Enrique Castillo as Eduardo Villar-Fuentes (season 5), the leader of a rival cartel to the LNG Cartel who joins Soledad's alliance of criminal factions.
- Will Peltz as Tony (season 5), Sofia's ex-boyfriend and the father of their deceased daughter.
- Kathleen Quinlan as Charlotte Buksar (season 5), Marlon Buksar's mother, who seeks justice for the death of her son.
- Raymond Cruz (Note: Cruz was previously cast as Che "Padre" Romero in the series' original pilot episode.) as Smokey (season 5), an incarcerated high-ranking gang member and Jay-Jay's cousin.
- Gilbert Glenn Brown as Lucky (season 5), the President of the Grim Bastards M.C., South Gate Charter, an all-African-American club allied with SAMCRO.
- Goldie DeWitt as Menace (season 5), reprising his role from Sons of Anarchy as the former Sgt-at-Arms of the Grim Bastards M.C., Lodi Charter, who has since patched over to the South Gate Charter.
- Jocko Willink as Gretton (season 5), Cole's boss and an experienced drug trafficker and arms dealer.
- Drea de Matteo as Wendy Case (season 5), reprising her role from Sons of Anarchy as Jax Teller's ex-wife and mother of his eldest son.

=== Mayans hierarchy ===
	Season 1	Season 2	Season 3	Season 4	Season 5
Presidente	Obispo “Bishop” Losa			Marcus Álvarez; Ezekiel "EZ" Reyes	Ezekiel "EZ" Reyes
Vice Presidente	Che "Taza" Romero			Obispo "Bishop" Losa; Ezekiel "EZ" Reyes	Obispo "Bishop" Losa
El Pacificador (Sergeant at Arms)	Hank "El Tranq" Loza				
El Secretario (Secretary)	Michael "Riz" Ariza; Angel Reyes	Angel Reyes			
Capitan Del Camino (Road Captain)	Neron "Creeper" Vargas				Gilberto "Gilly" Lopez

== Episodes ==
Season	Episodes	Originally released	
Season	Episodes	First released	Last released
1	10	September 4, 2018	November 6, 2018
2	10	September 3, 2019	November 5, 2019
3	10	March 16, 2021	May 11, 2021
4	10	April 19, 2022	June 14, 2022
5	10	May 24, 2023	July 19, 2023

=== Season 1 (2018) ===
No. overall	No. in season	Title (Note: Most of the episode titles follow a pattern made up of two names; the first in Spanish and the second, divided by a slash, refers to the Haabʼ and Tzolkʼin (Chol Qʼij in Kʼicheʼ and Mayan) calendars. When naming episodes, creators Kurt Sutter and Elgin James are utilizing what each episode features, and/or which symbolic animal will be present in that episode.)	Directed by	Written by	Original release date	Prod. code	U.S. viewers (millions)
1	1	"Perro/Oc"	Norberto Barba	Kurt Sutter & Elgin James	September 4, 2018	1WBD78	2.53
2	2	"Escorpión/Dzec"	Norberto Barba	Kurt Sutter	September 11, 2018	1WBD02	2.01
3	3	"Búho/Muwan"	Guy Ferland	Sean Tretta & Andrea Ciannavei	September 18, 2018	1WBD03	2.10
4	4	"Murciélago/Zotz"	Hanelle Culpepper	Kurt Sutter & Santa Sierra	September 25, 2018	1WBD04	1.53
5	5	"Uch/Opossum"	Batán Silva	Bryan Gracia	October 2, 2018	1WBD05	1.39
6	6	"Gato/Mis"	Félix Enríquez Alcalá	Debra Moore Muñoz	October 9, 2018	1WBD06	1.35
7	7	"Cucaracha/K'uruch"	Rachel Goldberg	Elgin James	October 16, 2018	1WBD07	1.29
8	8	"Rata/Ch'o"	Peter Weller	Andrea Ciannavei & Kurt Sutter	October 23, 2018	1WBD08	1.22
9	9	"Serpiente/Chikchan"	Norberto Barba	Sean Tretta & Kurt Sutter	October 30, 2018	1WBD09	1.23
10	10	"Cuervo/Tz'ikb'uul"	Elgin James	Kurt Sutter	November 6, 2018	1WBD10	1.31

=== Season 2 (2019) ===
No. overall	No. in season	Title (Note: The episode titles are named after Mayan gods.)	Directed by	Written by	Original release date	Prod. code	U.S. viewers (millions)
11	1	"Xbalanque"	Kevin Dowling	Kurt Sutter	September 3, 2019	2WBD01	1.39
12	2	"Xaman-Ek"	Sebastian "Batán" Silva	Sean Tretta & Andrea Ciannavei	September 10, 2019	2WBD02	1.06
13	3	"Camazotz"	Guy Ferland	Elgin James & Jenny Lynn	September 17, 2019	2WBD03	1.12
14	4	"Lahun Chan"	Rebecca Rodriguez	Bryan Gracia	September 24, 2019	2WBD04	1.04
15	5	"Xquic"	Rachel Goldberg	Debra Moore Munoz	October 1, 2019	2WBD05	1.00
16	6	"Muluc"	Guy Ferland	Andrea Ciannavei	October 8, 2019	2WBD06	1.03
17	7	"Tohil"	Peter Weller	Jenny Lynn	October 15, 2019	2WBD07	1.10
18	8	"Kukulkan"	Allison Anders	Sean Tretta	October 22, 2019	2WBD08	1.01
19	9	"Itzam-Ye"	Kevin Dowling	Kurt Sutter & Elgin James	October 29, 2019	2WBD09	1.05
20	10	"Hunahpu"	Elgin James	Kurt Sutter	November 5, 2019	2WBD10	0.95

=== Season 3 (2021) ===
No. overall	No. in season	Title	Directed by	Written by	Original release date	Prod. code	U.S. viewers (millions)
21	1	"Pap Struggles with the Death Angel"	Michael Dinner	Elgin James	March 16, 2021	3WBD01	0.840
22	2	"The Orneriness of Kings"	Michael Dinner	Sean Tretta	March 16, 2021	3WBD02	0.536
23	3	"Overreaching Don't Pay"	Rachel Goldberg	Andrea Ciannavei & Jenny Lynn	March 23, 2021	3WBD03	0.843
24	4	"Our Gang's Dark Oath"	Brett Dos Santos	Bryan Gracia & Sara Price	March 30, 2021	3WBD04	0.712
25	5	"Dark, Deep-Laid Plans"	Elgin James	Debra Moore Muñoz	April 6, 2021	3WBD05	0.605
26	6	"You Can't Pray a Lie"	Elgin James	Andrea Ciannavei	April 13, 2021	3WBD06	0.727
27	7	"What Comes of Handlin' Snakeskin"	Elgin James	Bryan Gracia	April 20, 2021	3WBD07	0.872
28	8	"A Mixed-up and Splendid Rescue"	Alonso Alvarez-Barreda	Jenny Lynn	April 27, 2021	3WBD08	0.793
29	9	"The House of Death Floats By"	Elgin James	Sean Tretta	May 4, 2021	3WBD09	0.779
30	10	"Chapter the Last, Nothing More to Write"	Elgin James	Elgin James & Debra Moore Muñoz	May 11, 2021	3WBD10	0.807

=== Season 4 (2022) ===
No. overall	No. in season	Title	Directed by	Written by	Original release date	Prod. code	U.S. viewers (millions)
31	1	"Cleansing of the Temple"	Elgin James	Elgin James	April 19, 2022	4WBD01	0.680
32	2	"Hymn Among Ruins"	Elgin James	Debra Moore Muñoz	April 19, 2022	4WBD02	0.562
33	3	"Self Portrait in a Blue Bathroom"	Brett Dos Santos	Gerald Cuesta	April 26, 2022	4WBD03	0.511
34	4	"A Crow Flew By"	Michael D. Olmos	Sara Price	May 3, 2022	4WBD04	0.541
35	5	"Death of the Virgin"	Elgin James	Sean Clayton Varela	May 10, 2022	4WBD05	0.517
36	6	"When I Die, I Want Your Hands on my Eyes"	Melissa Hickey	Elba Román-Morales	May 17, 2022	4WBD06	0.597
37	7	"Dialogue with the Mirror"	Elgin James	Debra Moore Muñoz & Richard Cabral	May 24, 2022	4WBD07	0.632
38	8	"The Righteous Wrath of an Honorable Man"	Danny Pino	Debra Moore Muñoz	May 31, 2022	4WBD08	0.640
39	9	"The Calling of Saint Matthew"	Brett Dos Santos	Gerald Cuesta & Sara Price	June 7, 2022	4WBD09	0.776
40	10	"When the Breakdown Hit at Midnight"	Elgin James	Elgin James & Sean Varela	June 14, 2022	4WBD10	0.619

=== Season 5 (2023) ===
No. overall	No. in season	Title	Directed by	Written by	Original release date	Prod. code	U.S. viewers (millions)
41	1	"I Hear the Train A-Comin"	Elgin James	Elgin James	May 24, 2023	5WBD01	0.560
42	2	"Lord Help My Poor Soul"	Brett Dos Santos	Jenny Lynn	May 24, 2023	5WBD02	0.406
43	3	"Do You Hear the Rain"	Danny Pino	Vivian Tse	May 31, 2023	5WBD03	0.399
44	4	"I See the Black Light"	J. D. Pardo	Meredith Danluck	June 7, 2023	5WBD04	0.400
45	5	"I Want Nothing but Death"	Elgin James	Sean Varela	June 14, 2023	5WBD05	0.419
46	6	"My Eyes Filled and Then Closed on the Last of Childhood Tears"	Allison Anders	Miriam Hernandez	June 21, 2023	5WBD06	0.454
47	7	"To Fear of Death, I Eat the Stars"	Elgin James	Vivian Tse	June 28, 2023	5WBD07	0.494
48	8	"Her Blacks Crackle and Drag"	Brett Dos Santos	Sean Varela & Vincent Vargas	July 5, 2023	5WBD08	0.529
49	9	"I Must Go in Now for the Fog Is Rising"	Elgin James	Jenny Lynn	July 12, 2023	5WBD09	0.524
50	10	"Slow to Bleed Fair Son"	Elgin James	Elgin James & Sean Varela	July 19, 2023	5WBD10	0.491

== Production ==
=== Development ===
On May 11, 2016, it was announced that FX had begun formal script development on a spinoff of the television series Sons of Anarchy. The long-rumored offshoot, entitled Mayans M.C., was created by Kurt Sutter and Elgin James, with James writing the pilot script and both executive producing. Production companies announced as being involved with the series included Fox 21 Television Studios and FX Productions. On December 1, 2016, FX officially gave the production a pilot order. It was also announced that Sutter would direct the series' pilot episode.

On July 5, 2017, it was announced that the pilot would be undergoing reshoots and that Norberto Barba would be replacing Sutter as director of the episode as Sutter planned to exclusively focus on the writing of the episode. Additionally, it was reported that various roles would be recast and that Barba would also be serving as an executive producer.

On January 5, 2018, FX announced at the annual Television Critics Association's winter press tour that the production had been given a series order for a first season consisting of ten episodes. On June 28, 2018, it was reported that the series would premiere on September 4, 2018. On October 1, 2018, it was announced that FX had renewed the series for a second season which premiered on September 3, 2019. On November 4, 2019, FX renewed the series for a third season which premiered on March 16, 2021. On May 3, 2021, FX renewed the series for a fourth season which premiered on April 19, 2022. On July 24, 2022, FX renewed the series for a fifth season. On January 12, 2023, FX announced that the fifth season would be its last. The fifth and final season premiered on May 24, 2023.

=== Casting ===
In February 2017, it was announced that Edward James Olmos, John Ortiz, J. D. Pardo, and Antonio Jaramillo had been cast in lead roles in the pilot. In March 2017, it was reported that Richard Cabral, Sarah Bolger, Jacqueline Obradors, and Andrea Londo had also been cast. In October 2017, it was announced that Michael Irby and Raoul Trujillo had been cast in series regular roles. In November 2016, it was reported that Emilio Rivera would be reprising his role of Marcus Álvarez from Sons of Anarchy in the series. On April 25, 2017, it was announced that Carla Baratta would be replacing Andrea Londo in the role of Adelita. Additionally, it was reported that Maurice Compte had been cast in a potentially recurring role. On May 1, 2017, it was reported that Efrat Dor would joining the cast in a potentially recurring capacity. In October 2017, it was announced that Danny Pino and Vincent Vargas had been cast in the pilot with Pino in a starring role. In April 2018, it was announced that Gino Vento and Tony Plana had been cast in recurring roles. On July 22, 2018, Sutter revealed in an interview with Deadline Hollywood that Ortiz had been replaced by Michael Irby.

=== Filming ===
Principal photography for the pilot episode was expected to begin in March 2017. In July 2017, it was reported that the pilot would undergo reshoots that would take place in late summer 2017. Those reshoots reportedly began during the week of October 23, 2017, in Los Angeles.

== Release ==
=== Premiere ===
On June 8, 2018, the series held an official world premiere sneak peek at the annual ATX Television Festival in Austin, Texas. Co-creators Kurt Sutter and Elgin James, executive producer/director Norberto Barba, and cast members took part in the Republic of Texas Motorcycle Rally in downtown Austin. This was followed by a screening of an exclusive clip from the show and a question-and-answer panel at the Paramount Theatre with guests including producers Sutter, James, and Barba as well cast members such as J. D. Pardo, Clayton Cardenas, Sarah Bolger, Carla Baratta, Richard Cabral, Antonio Jaramillo, Emilio Rivera, Danny Pino, Michael Irby, Vincent Vargas, Raoul Trujillo, and Frankie Loyal.

On July 22, 2018, the series held a panel at San Diego Comic-Con in Hall H of the San Diego Convention Center in San Diego, California. The panel was moderated by Entertainment Weekly's Lynnette Rice and included creators Sutter and James as well as cast member J.D. Pardo. The panel also included a screening of the first thirteen minutes of the pilot episode.

On August 28, 2018, the series held its official premiere at the Grauman's Chinese Theatre in Los Angeles, California. Those in attendance included J.D. Pardo, Edward James Olmos, Sarah Bolger, Michael Irby, Clayton Cardenas, Kurt Sutter, Katey Sagal, Raoul Max Trujillo, Danny Pino, Antonio Jaramillo, Richard Cabral, Maurice Compte, Carla Baratta, Emilio Rivera, and Yadi Valeria.

=== Distribution ===
As of 2018, Mayans M.C. is airing in the following countries and channels: The series premiered on September 4, 2018, on FoxPremium in South America and FXNow in Canada. It premiered on September 5, 2018, on Fox Showcase in Australia, Canal+ in France, Neon in New Zealand, and HBO in Denmark, Norway, Spain, Finland and Sweden. In 2019, it was made available in the UK by BBC iPlayer.

== Reception ==
=== Critical response ===
Critical response of Mayans M.C.
Season	Rotten Tomatoes	Metacritic
1	72% (36 reviews)	57 (19 reviews)
2	100% (5 reviews)	—N/a

On the review aggregation website Rotten Tomatoes, the first season holds a 72% approval rating with an average rating of 6.43 out of 10 based on 36 reviews. The website's critical consensus reads, "Mayans M.C. is a thrilling drama with compelling characters, but it struggles to find its pace and the Tellers are hard to forget." On Metacritic, the season has a score of 57 out of 100, based on 19 critics, indicating "mixed or average reviews".

The second season has a 100% approval rating on Rotten Tomatoes, with an average rating of 7.75 out of 10 based on 5 reviews.

=== Ratings ===
Viewership and ratings per season of Mayans M.C.
Season	Timeslot (ET)	Episodes	First aired		Last aired		Avg. viewers (millions)	18–49 rank	Avg. 18–49 rating
Season	Timeslot (ET)	Episodes	Date	Viewers (millions)	Date	Viewers (millions)	Avg. viewers (millions)	18–49 rank	Avg. 18–49 rating
1	Tuesday 10:00 pm	10	September 4, 2018	2.53	November 6, 2018	1.31	1.60	TBD	0.63
2	Tuesday 10:00 pm	10	September 3, 2019	1.39	November 5, 2019	0.95	1.07	TBD	0.39
3	Tuesday 10:00 pm	10	March 16, 2021	0.84	May 11, 2021	0.81	TBD	TBD	TBD
4	Tuesday 10:00 pm	10	April 19, 2022	0.68	June 14, 2022	0.62	TBD	TBD	TBD
5	Wednesday 10:00 pm	10	May 24, 2023	0.56	July 19, 2023	0.49	TBD	TBD	TBD

Mayans M.C. : U.S. viewers per episode (millions)

Season	Episode number									
Season	1	2	3	4	5	6	7	8	9	10
1	2.53	2.01	2.10	1.53	1.39	1.35	1.29	1.22	1.23	1.31
2	1.39	1.06	1.12	1.04	1.00	1.03	1.10	1.01	1.05	0.95
3	0.84	0.54	0.84	0.71	0.61	0.73	0.87	0.79	0.78	0.81
4	0.68	0.56	0.51	0.54	0.52	0.60	0.63	0.64	0.77	0.62
5	0.560	0.406	0.399	0.400	0.419	0.454	0.494	0.529	0.524	0.491

Audience measurement performed by Nielsen Media Research

=== Accolades ===
Year	Award	Category	Nominee(s)	Result	Ref.
2019	ICG Publicists Awards	Maxwell Weinberg Publicist Showmanship Television Award	Chris Kaspers	Nominated	
2019	Critics' Choice Television Awards	Best Supporting Actor in a Drama Series	Richard Cabral	Nominated	
2021	Imagen Foundation Awards	Best Actor – Television (Drama)	J. D. Pardo	Won	
2021	Imagen Foundation Awards	Best Supporting Actor – Television (Drama)	Edward James Olmos	Nominated	
2021	Imagen Foundation Awards	Best Supporting Actress – Television (Drama)	Sulem Calderon	Nominated	
2021	Imagen Foundation Awards	Best Primetime Program – Drama	Mayans M.C.	Nominated	
2022	BMI Film & TV Awards	BMI Cable Television Awards	David Wingo	Won	
2022	American Society of Cinematographers Awards	Outstanding Achievement in Cinematography in Episode of a One-Hour Series for Commercial Television	David Stockton	Nominated	
