= Richard Cabral =

American actor (born 1984)

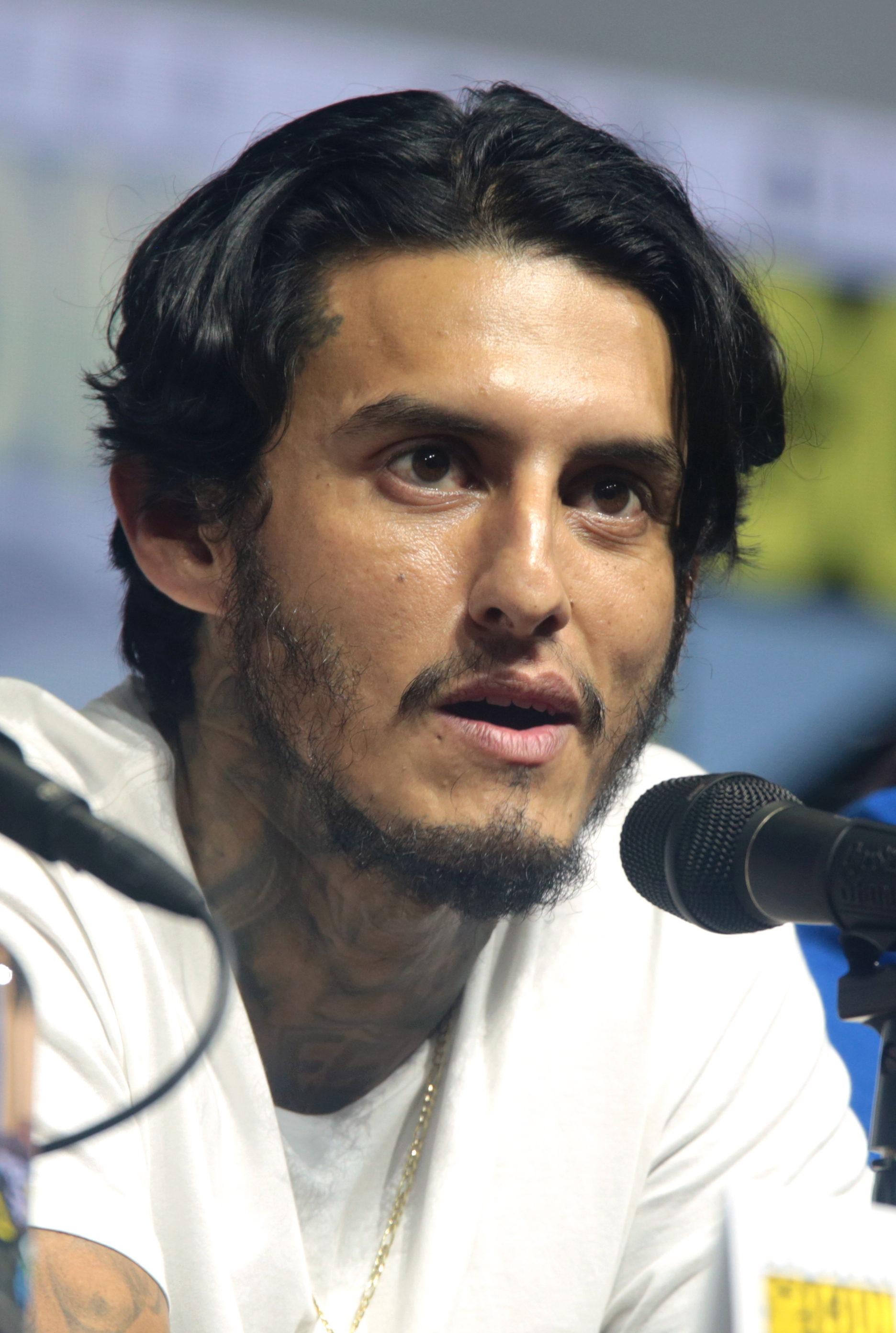
- Cabral at the 2018 San Diego Comic-Con
- Born: August 28, 1984 (age 42); Los Angeles, California, U.S.
- Other name: Baby Jokes
- Occupation: Actor
- Years active: 2009–present
- Spouse: Debra Moore Muñoz

Richard Cabral (born August 28, 1984) is an American actor, occasional producer and writer. He has appeared in roles on Mayans M.C. on FX, the ABC television series American Crime, which earned him a Primetime Emmy Award nomination in 2015, and the Fox television series Lethal Weapon.

== Early life ==
Cabral grew up in East Los Angeles, in a second-generation Mexican-American family. He became involved in gang activity from an early age. He said in an interview with Entertainment Tonight that his family had been a part of the gang scene since the 1990s. He was a documented member of Varrio 213 in Montebello, California. When he was a child, he was separated from his family. He was incarcerated at the age of 13 for stealing a wallet. Cabral developed an addiction to crack cocaine by the age of 15. He obtained his GED as a teenager but once again got in trouble with the law. He was sentenced to prison for violent assault with a deadly weapon (shooting), and was released at the age of 25.

== Career ==
Cabral's entertainment career started in the Chicano Rap music scene as a member of the chicano rap group "Charlie Row Campo". He created several albums and features under the moniker "Baby Jokes", or "Joker". The music mostly depicted negative, gang-related street tales.

While Cabral was trying to turn his life around, his friends recommended he seek out the services of Homeboy Industries, a gang-intervention program based in Los Angeles. There he auditioned and landed his first role, which led him to further his skills through acting classes and seminars. In 2009, he began to act, with Cabral appearing in the television show Southland. In 2010, he appeared in the music video for Bruno Mars' single "Grenade".

In 2015, Cabral starred in the mini-series American Crime, in which he portrayed the character Hector Tontz. For his role, Cabral was nominated for Outstanding Supporting Actor in a Limited Series or a Movie at the 2015 Primetime Emmy Awards.

In 2016, Cabral co-wrote with Robert Egan a one-man show called Fighting Shadows, about his experiences as a former gang member who spent years in and out of prison.

== Awards ==
In 2013, Cabral won the Lo Maximo award from Homeboy Industries, which honors HI service recipients who give back to the community.

== Filmography ==
Key
†	Denotes films that have not yet been released

=== Film ===
Year	Title	Role
2011	A Better Life	Marcelo Valdez
2012	End of Watch	'Demon'
2013	Snitch	'Flaco'
2013	The Counselor	'The Green Hornet'
2014	Paranormal Activity: The Marked Ones	Arturo Lopez
2014	Walk of Shame	Gang Member
2016	Blood Father	'Joker'
2017	Khali the Killer	Khali
2018	Breaking In	Duncan
2018	Peppermint	Salazar
2018	All Creatures Here Below	Hugo
2019	Windows on the World	Domingo
TBA	Eleven Days †	TBA (post-production)

=== Television ===
Year	Title	Role	Notes
2009, 2011	Southland	'Joker' Ruiz	Episode: "Derailed"
2009, 2011	Southland	Cholo #2	Episode: "Code 4"
2009, 2011	Southland	'Leprechaun'	3 episodes
2011	Body of Proof	Jorge	Episode: "Hunting Party"
2012	Luck	Store Clerk	Episode: "#1.3"
2012	The Big Bang Theory	Court Scene; Groom	Episode: "The Countdown Reflection"
2013	Chicago Fire	Inmate Rios	Episode: "A Hell of a Ride"
2014	Bosch	Jimmy Uribe (uncredited)	Episode: "Chapter One: 'Tis the Season"
2014	Key and Peele	Eduardo	Episode: "Terrorist Meeting"
2015–2017	American Crime	Hector Tonz (s1), Sebastian De Le Torre (s2), Isaac Castillo (s3)	Main cast (seasons 1, 3), recurring role (season 2) (anthology series company of actors, unrelated story/characters each season)
2016–2017	Lethal Weapon	Detective Alex Cruz	Recurring role (season 1)
2018–2022	Mayans M.C.	Johnny 'Coco' Cruz	Main cast (seasons 1–4); also screenwriter, episode: "Dialogue With the Mirror"
2019	Into the Dark	Santo Cristobal	Episode: "Culture Shock"
2023	Law & Order: Special Victims Unit	Ivan "Dutch" Hernandez	Episode: "Dutch Tears"
2023	Twisted Metal	Loud	Recurring role (season 1)
2025	Ballard	Javier Fuentes	2 episodes
2026	Criminal Minds	David Graham	Episode: "Cluster"

=== Music Videos ===
Year	Song	Band
2012	Good Girls Bad Guys	Falling In Reverse
2010	Grenade	Bruno Mars

=== Discography ===
Year	Song	Artist
2010	East Side Classics	Jasper Loco & Baby Jokes
2010	Gutter Tales	Jasper Loco & Baby Jokes
2011	Life On The Streets	Baby Jokes
2012	Wanted	Baby Jokes

== Awards and nominations ==
Year	Award	Category	Nominated work	Result
2015	67th Primetime Emmy Awards	Outstanding Supporting Actor in a Limited Series or Movie	American Crime	Nominated
2015	19th OFTA Television Awards	Best Supporting Actor in a Motion Picture or Miniseries	American Crime	Nominated
2016	20th Satellite Awards	Best Ensemble – Television Series (shared with the ensemble)	American Crime	Won
