= Mike Beltran (referee) =

American mixed martial arts referee

- Occupation: Mixed martial arts referee
- Years active: 2000s–present
- Known for: Officiating in UFC and Bellator MMA

Mike Beltran is an American mixed martial arts (MMA) referee known for officiating bouts in the Ultimate Fighting Championship (UFC), Bellator, and other major promotions.

== Early life and education ==
Beltran was born and raised in Downey, California. Before beginning his officiating career, he served as a law enforcement officer in Los Angeles County. He developed an early interest in combat sports and trained in boxing and Brazilian jiu-jitsu (BJJ). Before becoming a referee, Beltran competed as an amateur fighter. In 2024, he was awarded his black belt in BJJ.

Beltran began officiating mixed martial arts events in the mid-2000s. Over time, he became a fixture in several major promotions, including the Ultimate Fighting Championship, Bellator, and various regional organizations. Known for his calm demeanor and authoritative presence in the cage, Beltran has officiated numerous high-profile fights, including championship bouts. In interviews, Beltran has cited veteran referee John McCarthy as a major influence on his career.

Beltran is known for his signature long mustache, which has become a defining characteristic of his public image. Outside of MMA, he has been involved in community activities in Downey, California, and maintains close ties to his hometown.
