= Emily Tosta =

Dominican actress

Emilia Tosta
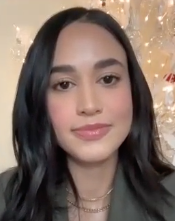
- Tosta in 2023
- Born: Emilia Gabriela Attias Tosta; 26 March 1998 (age 28); Santo Domingo, Dominican Republic
- Occupation: Actress
- Years active: 2013–present

Emilia Gabriela Attias Tosta (born 26 March 1998), known professionally as Emily Tosta, is a Dominican actress. She is known for playing Leticia in the television series Mayans M.C..

== Biography ==
Tosta was born in Santo Domingo, Dominican Republic. Her mother, Emilia Tosta, is Venezuelan and her father is Dominican. She moved to Miami when she was 12 to pursue a career in acting. In 2014, her family moved to Los Angeles.

== Career ==
She had a recurring role as Leticia Cruz in Mayans M.C.. Her breakout role was as Lucia Acosta in the Freeform television series Party of Five (2020).

She starred in the 2021 film Willy's Wonderland with Nicolas Cage, Tito: Peace of Heaven and the 2023 film How the Gringo Stole Christmas with George Lopez.

== Filmography ==
=== Television ===
Year	Title	Role	Notes
2013	Dama y obrero	Gina	1 episode
2018	The Resident	Joplin Bird	1 episode
2018–2023	Mayans M.C.	Leticia Cruz	
2020	Party of Five	Lucia Acosta	Main role
2023	Holiday Twist	Brooke	

=== Film ===
Year	Film	Role	Notes
2020	Selfie Dad	Ali	
2021	Willy's Wonderland	Liv Hawthorne	
2023	How the Gringo Stole Christmas	Claudia	
TBA	Tito: Peace of Heaven	Amy Tinoco	Pre-production
