= Vincent Vargas =

American actor

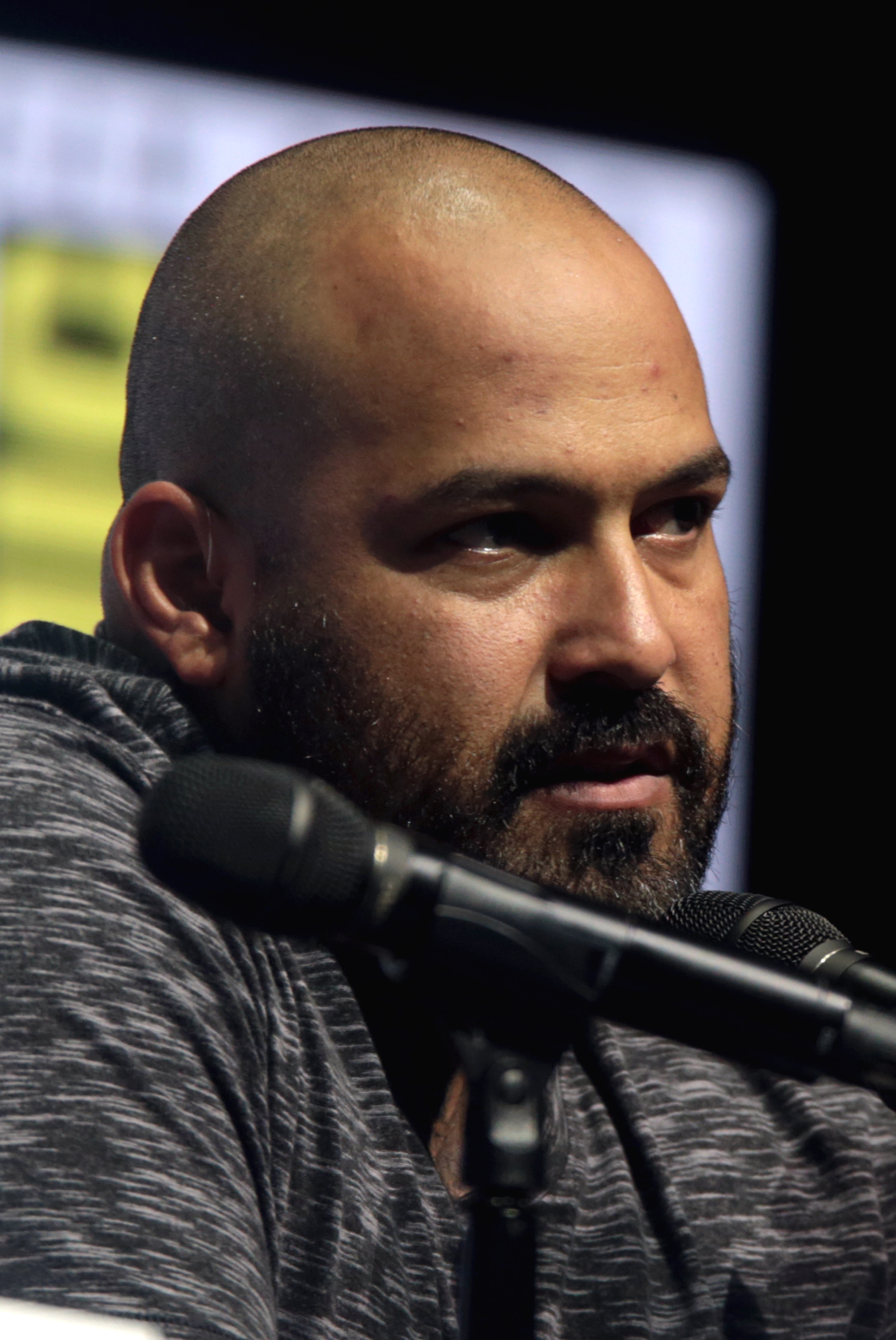
- Vargas at the 2018 San Diego Comic-Con
- Born: July 15, 1981 (age 45); San Fernando Valley, California, U.S.
- Occupations: Veteran; Actor; Writer; Producer; Motivational Speaker
- Years active: 1999–present
- Website: https://www.vincentroccovargas.com/

Vincent "Rocco" Vargas (born July 15, 1981) is an American actor, producer, and writer. His credits include roles in the film Range 15 and the television series Mayans M.C., and he is the creator of the MBest11x YouTube channel.

== Early life ==
Vincent "Rocco" Vargas was born and raised in the San Fernando Valley of Los Angeles, California. Vargas enlisted in the United States Army (2003–2015) and began to serve 3 combat deployments with the 2nd Ranger Battalion, 75th Ranger Regiment. Vargas relatedly served as an Infantry Drill Sergeant. He then left active duty and entered the reserves with the rank of Sergeant First Class. After leaving active duty, Vargas served as a medic with the Arizona Department of Corrections and the U.S. Border Patrol in the Special Operations Group (BORSTAR) before resigning in 2013 to work in the entertainment industry.

== Career ==
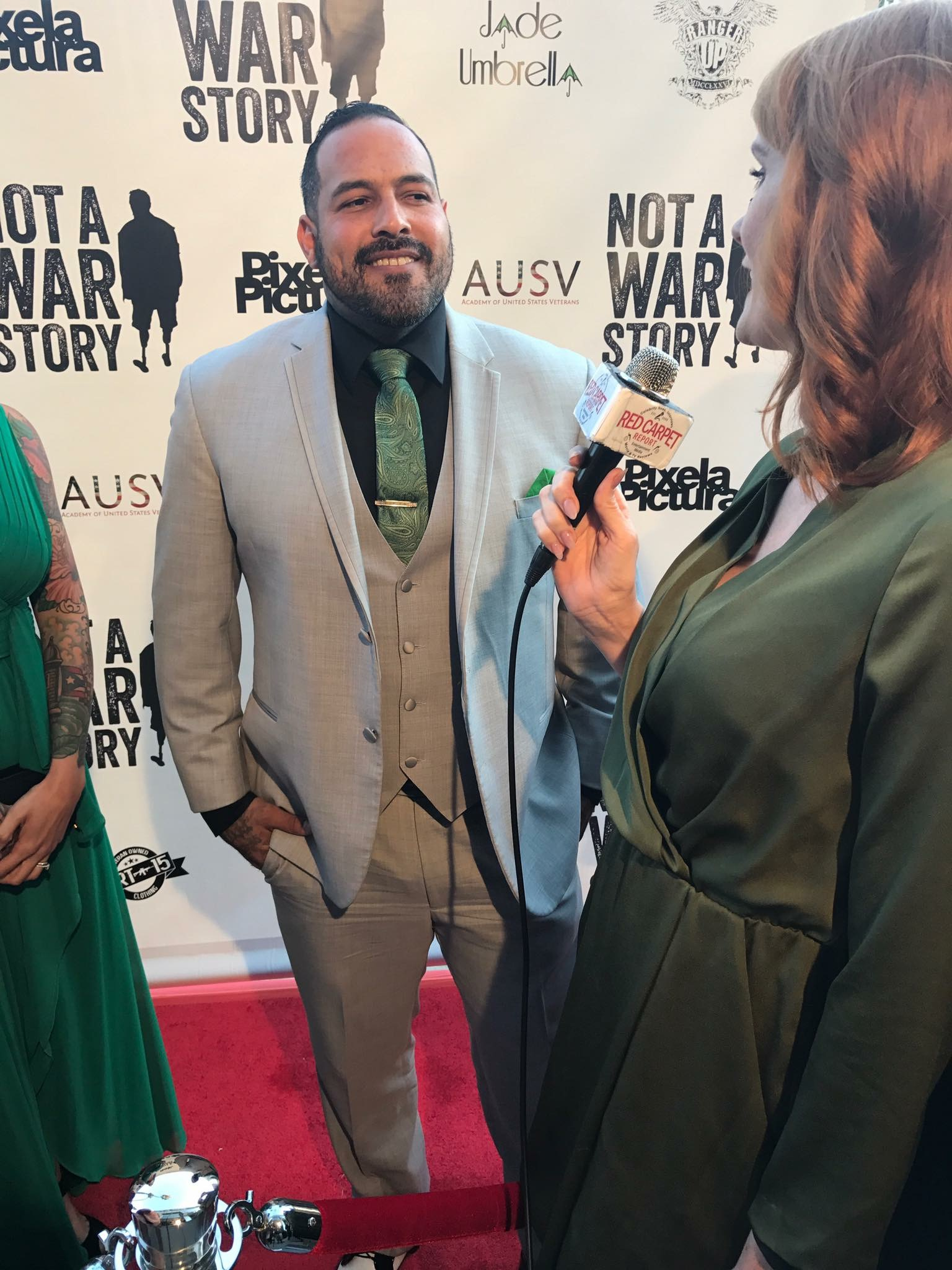
Rocco being interviewed at a red carpet event.

Following his military and law enforcement service, Vargas began working in the film industry. In 2020, he had a co-starring role in the film Lucy Shimmers and the Prince of Peace.

Vargas has also co-written and starred in a number of television shows, including notably Mayans MC (2018-2023) and Office Joe (2024).

== Personal life ==
Vargas is a motivational speaker whose presentations are directed toward military veterans and youth. Due to his combat experiences, Vargas has suffered from PTSD which has led to two failed marriages, alcoholism, and alleged sleep issues, with him currently being sober for over three years. Vargas lives in Salt Lake City, Utah. Vargas hosts a weekly podcast, "Vinny Roc Podcast," where he interviews veterans and discusses topics such as the transition to civilian life and personal health.

== Filmography ==
Year	Title	Role	Producer	Writer	Notes
2015	Helen Keller vs. Nightwolves	Julio Scagnetti	No	No	
2016	Range 15	Himself	Yes	No	
2016	The Long Way Back	The Veteran	No	Yes	Short film; also stunt coordinator
2016	Living For The Ones Who Can't	Himself	No	No	Documentary short
2016-2017	Dads in Parks	Himself	No	Yes	Web series; main cast
2017	Not a War Story	Himself	Yes	No	Documentary
2017	Dark of Light	Karl	No	No	
2017	Drinkin' Bros Live: The Shaved Eagle Tour	Rocco	Yes	No	
2018–2023	Mayans MC	Gilberto 'Gilly' Lopez	No	Yes	TV series; Main cast, writer (1 episode)
2018	Brothers in Arms	Himself	No	No	TV series; Main cast
2020	Lucy Shimmers and the Prince of Peace	Edgar Ruiz	No	No	Costar with child actress Scarlett Diamond; 2nd in credits
2022	The Shoebox	Sergeant	No	No	Short film
2024	S.W.A.T.	Benicio 'El Rey' Ramirez	No	No	TV series; Minor role
2024	Office Joe	Tony Garcia	Yes	Yes	TV series; Main cast
2025	Homestead: The Series	Santos	No	No	TV series; Main cast

== Bibliography ==
Title	Publication	ISBN/ASIN	Ref(s)
Sugarman (Sugarman Series Book 1)	2019	B081VQCRJL	
Light the Fuse	2019	B08145113X	
Borderline: Defending the Home Front	2024	1250876494	
