= Carla Baratta =

Venezuelan actress and model

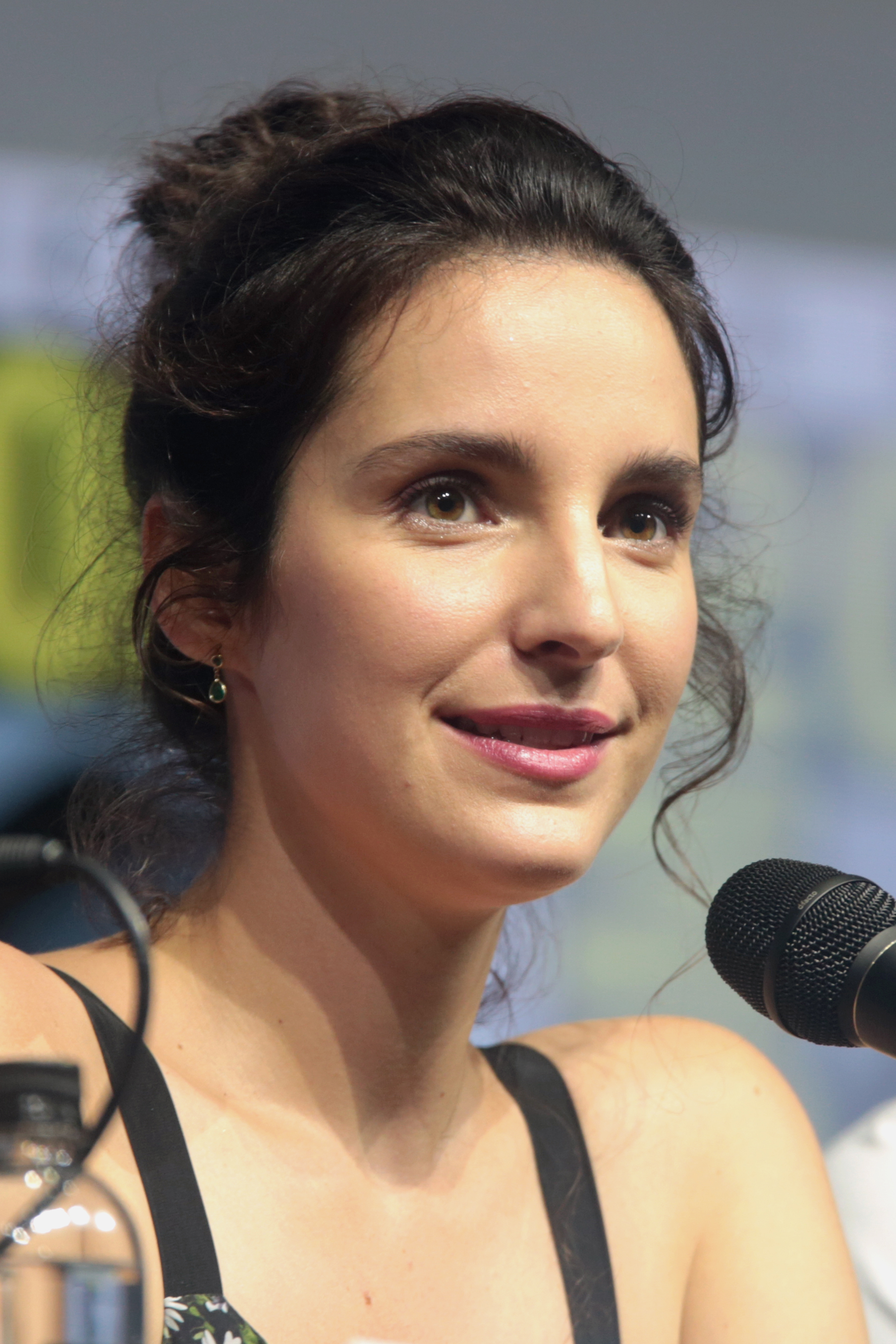
- Baratta at San Diego Comic-Con in 2018
- Born: 9 July 1990 (age 36); San Cristóbal, Táchira, Venezuela
- Occupations: Actress; model; artist
- Spouse: Guillermo García (m. 2016)
- Children: 2

Carla Baratta Sarcinelli (born 9 July 1990) is a Venezuelan actress, model, and artist. She is most well known for being the star of the digital series Bleep, broadcast by the mobile phone company Digitel GSM. Since she was young, she has studied stage acting in places such as Estudio 7 Alfredo Aparicio in San Cristobal-Venezuela, the New York Film Academy and the New Collective in Los Angeles, as well as the Actors Gym in Caracas.

In 2017, The Hollywood Reporter reported that she had been cast in the Sons of Anarchy spinoff, Mayans MC, as Adelita.

== Career ==
=== Theater ===
Year	Title	Director
2004–2007	Experimental	Alfredo Aparicio
2015–2016	El Pie de la Virgen	Orlando Arocha

=== Film ===
Year	Title	Director
2015	La Empanada Perfecta	Edggianni Figueroa

=== Television and web series ===
Year	Title	Director
2014	Bleep	Carlos Beltran
2015	Santo Robot	Santo Robot
2015	Escandalos	Tony Rodriguez
2015	Sol	Venevisión
2016	Prueba de Fe	Cesar Manzano
2018-2023	Mayans M.C.	Kurt Sutter and Norberto Barba
2024-2026	Cien años de soledad	Alex García López, Laura Mora

=== Music Videos ===
Year	Title	Musician/Band
2011	Solo Te Llamo	Statika
2012	Ven	José_Rojo
2014	Baila	Daniel Huen
2015	La Buena Fortuna	Mirella
2016	Dame Tu Amor	Ronald Borjas
2016	Jamás	Reinaldo Droz
2016	Andas En Mi Cabeza	Chino y Nacho ft. Daddy Yankee
