= List of Sons of Anarchy episodes =

Sons of Anarchy, a television drama series created by Kurt Sutter, premiered on September 3, 2008 on the cable network FX in the United States. The series concluded on December 9, 2014, after 92 episodes broadcast over seven seasons.

Sons of Anarchy tells the story of an outlaw motorcycle club based in the fictional small town of Charming, California. The show follows protagonist Jackson "Jax" Teller (Charlie Hunnam), son of the deceased founding president John Teller, who begins questioning the club and the direction in which they should be heading.

== Series overview ==
Season	Episodes	Originally released		Viewers (in millions)
Season	Episodes	First released	Last released	Viewers (in millions)
1	13	September 3, 2008	November 26, 2008	2.21
2	13	September 8, 2009	December 1, 2009	3.67
3	13	September 7, 2010	November 30, 2010	3.22
4	14	September 6, 2011	December 6, 2011	5.45
5	13	September 11, 2012	December 4, 2012	4.37
6	13	September 10, 2013	December 10, 2013	7.48
7	13	September 9, 2014	December 9, 2014	4.60

== Episodes ==
=== Season 1 (2008) ===
No. overall	No. in season	Title	Directed by	Written by	Original release date	Prod. code	U.S. viewers (millions)
1	1	"Pilot"	Allen Coulter & Michael Dinner	Kurt Sutter	September 3, 2008	1WAB79	2.53
2	2	"Seeds"	Charles Haid	Kurt Sutter	September 10, 2008	1WAB01	2.20
3	3	"Fun Town"	Stephen Kay	Kurt Sutter	September 17, 2008	1WAB02	2.10
4	4	"Patch Over"	Paris Barclay	James D. Parriott	September 24, 2008	1WAB03	2.25
5	5	"Giving Back"	Tim Hunter	Jack LoGiudice	October 1, 2008	1WAB04	2.19
6	6	"AK-51"	Seith Mann	Nichole Beattie	October 8, 2008	1WAB05	2.09
7	7	"Old Bones"	Gwyneth Horder-Payton	Dave Erickson	October 15, 2008	1WAB06	1.87
8	8	"The Pull"	Guy Ferland	Kurt Sutter & Jack LoGiudice	October 22, 2008	1WAB07	2.14
9	9	"Hell Followed"	Billy Gierhart	Brett Conrad	October 29, 2008	1WAB08	2.06
10	10	"Better Half"	Mario Van Peebles	Pat Charles	November 5, 2008	1WAB09	2.14
11	11	"Capybara"	Stephen Kay	Kurt Sutter & Dave Erickson	November 12, 2008	1WAB10	2.22
12	12	"The Sleep of Babies"	Terrence O'Hara	Kurt Sutter	November 19, 2008	1WAB11	2.46
13	13	"The Revelator"	Kurt Sutter	Kurt Sutter	November 26, 2008	1WAB12	2.48

=== Season 2 (2009) ===
No. overall	No. in season	Title	Directed by	Written by	Original release date	Prod. code	U.S. viewers (millions)
14	1	"Albification"	Guy Ferland	Kurt Sutter	September 8, 2009	2WAB01	4.29
15	2	"Small Tears"	Stephen Kay	Jack LoGiudice	September 15, 2009	2WAB02	3.71
16	3	"Fix"	Gwyneth Horder-Payton	Dave Erickson	September 22, 2009	2WAB03	3.49
17	4	"Eureka"	Guy Ferland	Kurt Sutter & Brett Conrad	September 29, 2009	2WAB04	3.76
18	5	"Smite"	Terrence O'Hara	Chris Collins	October 6, 2009	2WAB05	3.66
19	6	"Falx Cerebri"	Billy Gierhart	Regina Corrado	October 13, 2009	2WAB06	3.31
20	7	"Gilead"	Gwyneth Horder-Payton	Kurt Sutter & Chris Collins	October 20, 2009	2WAB07	3.70
21	8	"Potlatch"	Paul Maibaum	Kurt Sutter & Misha Green	October 27, 2009	2WAB08	3.39
22	9	"Fa Guan"	Stephen Kay	Brett Conrad & Liz Sagal	November 3, 2009	2WAB09	3.52
23	10	"Balm"	Paris Barclay	Dave Erickson & Stevie Long	November 10, 2009	2WAB10	3.38
24	11	"Service"	Phil Abraham	Story by : Brady Dahl & Cori Uchida; Teleplay by : Kurt Sutter & Jack LoGiudice	November 17, 2009	2WAB11	3.48
25	12	"The Culling"	Gwyneth Horder-Payton	Kurt Sutter & Dave Erickson	November 24, 2009	2WAB12	3.44
26	13	"Na Trioblóidí"	Kurt Sutter	Kurt Sutter	December 1, 2009	2WAB13	4.33

=== Season 3 (2010) ===
No. overall	No. in season	Title	Directed by	Written by	Original release date	Prod. code	U.S. viewers (millions)
27	1	"SO"	Stephen Kay	Kurt Sutter	September 7, 2010	3WAB01	4.13
28	2	"Oiled"	Gwyneth Horder-Payton	Kurt Sutter & Dave Erickson	September 14, 2010	3WAB02	3.37
29	3	"Caregiver"	Billy Gierhart	Chris Collins & Regina Corrado	September 21, 2010	3WAB03	3.48
30	4	"Home"	Guy Ferland	Kurt Sutter & Liz Sagal	September 28, 2010	3WAB04	2.98
31	5	"Turning and Turning"	Gwyneth Horder-Payton	Dave Erickson & Marco Ramirez	October 5, 2010	3WAB05	3.12
32	6	"The Push"	Stephen Kay	Chris Collins & Julie Bush	October 12, 2010	3WAB06	2.85
33	7	"Widening Gyre"	Billy Gierhart	Kurt Sutter & Regina Corrado	October 19, 2010	3WAB07	2.59
34	8	"Lochán Mór"	Guy Ferland	Dave Erickson & Liz Sagal & Kurt Sutter	October 26, 2010	3WAB08	2.67
35	9	"Turas"	Stephen Kay	Story by : Kurt Sutter; Teleplay by : Chris Collins & Brady Dahl	November 2, 2010	3WAB09	3.35
36	10	"Fírinne"	Gwyneth Horder-Payton	Kurt Sutter & Vaun Wilmott	November 9, 2010	3WAB10	3.18
37	11	"Bainne"	Adam Arkin	Dave Erickson & Regina Corrado & Kurt Sutter	November 16, 2010	3WAB11	3.40
38	12	"June Wedding"	Phil Abraham	Story by : Kurt Sutter; Teleplay by : Chris Collins	November 23, 2010	3WAB12	3.27
39	13	"NS"	Kurt Sutter	Kurt Sutter & Dave Erickson	November 30, 2010	3WAB13	3.59

=== Season 4 (2011) ===
No. overall	No. in season	Title	Directed by	Written by	Original release date	Prod. code	U.S. viewers (millions)
40	1	"Out"	Paris Barclay	Kurt Sutter	September 6, 2011	4WAB01	4.93
41	2	"Booster"	Guy Ferland	Dave Erickson & Chris Collins	September 13, 2011	4WAB02	3.71
42	3	"Dorylus"	Peter Weller	Regina Corrado & Liz Sagal	September 20, 2011	4WAB03	3.42
43	4	"Una Venta"	Billy Gierhart	Kurt Sutter & Marco Ramirez	September 27, 2011	4WAB04	3.28
44	5	"Brick"	Paris Barclay	Dave Erickson & Brady Dahl	October 4, 2011	4WAB05	3.51
45	6	"With an X"	Guy Ferland	Chris Collins & Regina Corrado	October 11, 2011	4WAB06	3.56
46	7	"Fruit for the Crows"	Gwyneth Horder-Payton	Kurt Sutter & Liz Sagal	October 18, 2011	4WAB07	3.65
47	8	"Family Recipe"	Paul Maibaum	Dave Erickson & Brady Dahl	October 25, 2011	4WAB08	3.82
48	9	"Kiss"	Billy Geirhart	Regina Corrado & Marco Ramirez	November 1, 2011	4WAB09	3.63
49	10	"Hands"	Peter Weller	Chris Collins & David LaBrava & Kurt Sutter	November 8, 2011	4WAB10	3.93
50	11	"Call of Duty"	Gwyneth Horder-Payton	Liz Sagal & Gladys Rodriguez	November 15, 2011	4WAB11	4.23
51	12	"Burnt and Purged Away"	Paris Barclay	Kurt Sutter & Dave Erickson	November 22, 2011	4WAB12	3.85
52	13	"To Be (Act 1)"	Kurt Sutter	Kurt Sutter & Chris Collins	November 29, 2011	4WAB13	4.42
53	14	"To Be (Act 2)"	Kurt Sutter	Kurt Sutter & Chris Collins	December 6, 2011	4WAB14	4.24

=== Season 5 (2012) ===
No. overall	No. in season	Title	Directed by	Written by	Original release date	Prod. code	U.S. viewers (millions)
54	1	"Sovereign"	Paris Barclay	Kurt Sutter	September 11, 2012	5WAB01	5.37
55	2	"Authority Vested"	Peter Weller	Regina Corrado	September 18, 2012	5WAB02	4.17
56	3	"Laying Pipe"	Adam Arkin	Kem Nunn & Liz Sagal & Kurt Sutter	September 25, 2012	5WAB03	3.80
57	4	"Stolen Huffy"	Paris Barclay	Chris Collins	October 2, 2012	5WAB04	4.60
58	5	"Orca Shrugged"	Gwyneth Horder-Payton	Regina Corrado & Kurt Sutter	October 9, 2012	5WAB05	4.34
59	6	"Small World"	Adam Arkin	Roberto Patino	October 16, 2012	5WAB06	4.03
60	7	"Toad's Wild Ride"	Peter Weller	Kurt Sutter & Chris Collins	October 23, 2012	5WAB07	4.30
61	8	"Ablation"	Karen Gaviola	Mike Daniels	October 30, 2012	5WAB08	4.58
62	9	"Andare Pescare"	Billy Gierhart	Liz Sagal & Kurt Sutter	November 6, 2012	5WAB09	3.96
63	10	"Crucifixed"	Guy Ferland	Kem Nunn	November 13, 2012	5WAB10	4.58
64	11	"To Thine Own Self"	Paris Barclay	Mike Daniels & John Barcheski & Kurt Sutter	November 20, 2012	5WAB11	4.23
65	12	"Darthy"	Peter Weller	Chris Collins & Kurt Sutter	November 27, 2012	5WAB12	4.25
66	13	"J'ai Obtenu Cette"	Kurt Sutter	Kurt Sutter & Chris Collins	December 4, 2012	5WAB13	4.66

=== Season 6 (2013) ===
No. overall	No. in season	Title	Directed by	Written by	Original release date	Prod. code	U.S. viewers (millions)
67	1	"Straw"	Paris Barclay	Kurt Sutter	September 10, 2013	6WAB01	5.87
68	2	"One One Six"	Peter Weller	Chris Collins & Adria Lang	September 17, 2013	6WAB02	4.63
69	3	"Poenitentia"	Guy Ferland	Charles Murray & Kurt Sutter	September 24, 2013	6WAB03	4.48
70	4	"Wolfsangel"	Billy Gierhart	Kurt Sutter & Kem Nunn	October 1, 2013	6WAB04	4.59
71	5	"The Mad King"	Gwyneth Horder-Payton	Chris Collins & Roberto Patino & Kurt Sutter	October 8, 2013	6WAB05	4.46
72	6	"Salvage"	Adam Arkin	Mike Daniels & Kurt Sutter	October 15, 2013	6WAB06	4.35
73	7	"Sweet and Vaded"	Paris Barclay	Kurt Sutter & Adria Lang	October 22, 2013	6WAB07	4.38
74	8	"Los Fantasmas"	Peter Weller	Roberto Patino & Kurt Sutter	October 29, 2013	6WAB08	4.20
75	9	"John 8:32"	Guy Ferland	Kem Nunn & Kurt Sutter	November 5, 2013	6WAB09	4.49
76	10	"Huang Wu"	Billy Gierhart	Kurt Sutter & Charles Murray	November 12, 2013	6WAB10	4.38
77	11	"Aon Rud Persanta"	Peter Weller	Chris Collins & Kurt Sutter	November 19, 2013	6WAB11	4.17
78	12	"You Are My Sunshine"	Paris Barclay	Kem Nunn & Mike Daniels & Kurt Sutter	December 3, 2013	6WAB12	4.58
79	13	"A Mother's Work"	Kurt Sutter	Kurt Sutter & Chris Collins	December 10, 2013	6WAB13	5.17

=== Season 7 (2014) ===
No. overall	No. in season	Title	Directed by	Written by	Original release date	Prod. code	U.S. viewers (millions)
80	1	"Black Widower"	Paris Barclay	Kurt Sutter	September 9, 2014	7WAB01	6.20
81	2	"Toil and Till"	Billy Gierhart	Charles Murray & Kurt Sutter	September 16, 2014	7WAB02	4.83
82	3	"Playing with Monsters"	Craig Yahata	Peter Elkoff & Kurt Sutter	September 23, 2014	7WAB03	4.13
83	4	"Poor Little Lambs"	Guy Ferland	Kem Nunn & Kurt Sutter	September 30, 2014	7WAB04	4.04
84	5	"Some Strange Eruption"	Peter Weller	Roberto Patino & Kurt Sutter	October 7, 2014	7WAB05	4.32
85	6	"Smoke 'em if You Got 'em"	Guy Ferland	Mike Daniels & Kurt Sutter	October 14, 2014	7WAB06	4.42
86	7	"Greensleeves"	Paris Barclay	Gladys Rodriguez & Josh Botana & Kurt Sutter	October 21, 2014	7WAB07	4.29
87	8	"The Separation of Crows"	Charles Murray	Peter Elkoff & John Barcheski & Kurt Sutter	October 28, 2014	7WAB08	3.94
88	9	"What a Piece of Work Is Man"	Peter Weller	Mike Daniels & Roberto Patino & Kurt Sutter	November 4, 2014	7WAB09	3.88
89	10	"Faith and Despondency"	Paris Barclay	Kem Nunn & Gladys Rodriguez & Kurt Sutter	November 11, 2014	7WAB10	4.38
90	11	"Suits of Woe"	Peter Weller	Peter Elkoff & Mike Daniels & Kurt Sutter	November 18, 2014	7WAB11	4.62
91	12	"Red Rose"	Paris Barclay	Kurt Sutter & Charles Murray	December 2, 2014	7WAB12	5.05
92	13	"Papa's Goods"	Kurt Sutter	Kurt Sutter	December 9, 2014	7WAB13	6.40

== Ratings ==
Sons of Anarchy : U.S. viewers per episode (millions)

Season	Episode number													
Season	1	2	3	4	5	6	7	8	9	10	11	12	13	14
1	2.53	2.20	2.10	2.25	2.19	2.09	1.87	2.14	2.06	2.14	2.22	2.46	2.48	–
2	4.29	3.71	3.49	3.76	3.66	3.31	3.70	3.39	3.52	3.38	3.48	3.44	4.33	–
3	4.13	3.37	3.48	2.98	3.12	2.85	2.59	2.67	3.35	3.18	3.40	3.27	3.59	–
4	4.93	3.71	3.42	3.28	3.51	3.56	3.65	3.82	3.63	3.93	4.23	3.85	4.42	4.24
5	5.37	4.17	3.80	4.60	4.34	4.03	4.30	4.58	3.96	4.58	4.23	4.25	4.66	–
6	5.87	4.63	4.48	4.59	4.46	4.35	4.38	4.20	4.49	4.38	4.17	4.58	5.17	–
7	6.20	4.83	4.13	4.04	4.32	4.42	4.29	3.94	3.88	4.38	4.62	5.05	6.40	–

Audience measurement performed by Nielsen Media Research
