= Albification =

- Sons of Anarchy episode
- Episode no.: Season 2 Episode 1
- Directed by: Guy Ferland
- Written by: Kurt Sutter
- Cinematography by: Paul Maibaum
- Editing by: Hunter M. Via
- Production code: 2WAB01
- Original air date: September 8, 2009
- Running time: 45 minutes

Guest appearances
- Adam Arkin as Ethan Zobelle; Ally Walker as Agent June Stahl; Taylor Sheridan as Chief David Hale; Dayton Callie as Wayne Unser; Mitch Pileggi as Ernest Darby; Jamie McShane as Cameron Hayes; Callard Harris as Edmond Hayes; Sarah Jones as Polly Zobelle; Jeff Kober as Jacob Hale Jr.; Henry Rollins as A.J. Weston; Julie Ariola as Mary Winston; Marcos de la Cruz as Estevez

Episode chronology
← Previous "The Revelator"	Next → "Small Tears"

"Albification" is the second season premiere of the FX television series Sons of Anarchy. It was written by Kurt Sutter, the original series creator, directed by Guy Ferland, and staff-written by Misha Green. It originally aired in the United States on September 9, 2009.

This episode marks the first appearance of Adam Arkin (Ethan Zobelle), Henry Rollins (A.J. Weston), and Sarah Jones (Polly Zobelle).

== Plot ==
The leadership of the Sons of Anarchy Motorcycle Club - Redwood Original (SAMCRO) secure a new gun trafficking deal with Cameron and Edmond Hayes of the Irish Republican Army. Tensions simmer within the group around the recent killing of Donna Winston, with her father-in-law Piney Winston pushing vice president Jax Teller to make good on his father's promise to change SAMCRO for the better.

Donna's husband Opie returns to Charming and seeks vengeance for her death. SAMCRO president Clay Morrow points the blame at a member of the Mayans Motorcycle Club and sends Jax, sergeant-at-arms Tig Trager, and Chibs Telford to help Opie. They chase the Mayans member to a construction site. Opie wants to torture a confession from the man, but Tig, who was responsible for Donna's accidental death, shoots the man in the mouth before he can talk. Jax, eager to see Opie get closure, tells him that they have the right man and Opie finishes him off before carving an "A" in his chest. Jax stays behind to remove the incriminating "A" and instead frames the One-Niners, the Mayans' chief rivals.

Ethan Zobelle and A.J. Weston, two members of a group called the League of American Nationalists, sit down for lunch with businessman Jacob Hale, Jr. The three men talk about their plans to take Charming back from SAMCRO, before they are joined by Jacob's younger brother, Deputy Police Chief David Hale. David immediately recognizes the men as neo-Nazis and leaves, chiding his brother for associating with them. Zobelle and Weston later visit Ernest Darby, head of the white supremacist Nordics gang, and supply him with money to bolster his criminal operation in Charming.

Later that night, at a SAMCRO party celebrating Bobby Munson's return from prison, Zobelle and his men arrive with an introductory gift of cigars. Zobelle demands that SAMCRO stop selling weapons to the Hispanic Mayans MC and the black One-Niners. Clay laughs in Zobelle's face and demands he leave. Shortly after they do so, Bobby arrives after being dropped off by ATF agent June Stahl. Jax's girlfriend, Dr. Tara Knowles, skips the party to watch Jax's son Abel and is joined by Gemma Teller Morrow. After Jax returns from the party, Tara finds bloody gloves among his clothes and asks Jax to tell her the truth about them. Jax shares that he helped Opie kill a man that day, leaving her stunned.

On her way home, Gemma is knocked unconscious by a blonde woman and abducted. She awakens in a warehouse, where she is gang-raped by three masked men who demand that her husband stop selling weapons to non-whites, lest they kidnap her again.

== Music ==
- "Leda Atomica" by Year Long Disaster

== Reception ==
The episode got 4.29 million viewers on its original network in the United States.

IGN gave "Albification" a 7.8/10.0 rating, stating; "Supposedly, Sons is loosely based on Hamlet. There are major differences from the two—there's no one resembling Rosencrantz and Guildenstern, for instance—but it fits. Jax is the princely Hamlet; Clay is Claudius, Gemma is Queen Gertrude and Jax's father's manuscript is the ghost that visits Hamlet in the beginning to warn poor Hamlet. But Hamlet is a terrible play to emulate."

Zack Handlen of The AV Club gave "Albification" an A− rating, stating; "The episode title, "Albification" means "the process of making white." On the one hand, we've got Zobelle and Weston doing their level best to purify the races, preaching "separatism," and demanding Clay stop selling guns to the Niners and the Mayans (a bad demand even in the best of times, but given the financial pressure the club is under, it's not a request that goes over too well). But there's also the way Jax, Clay, and Tig just want to pretend everything's clean when it clearly isn't. Some stains won't stay gone, no matter how many times you paint them over."
