= The Pull =

- Sons of Anarchy episode
- Episode no.: Season 1 Episode 8
- Directed by: Guy Ferland
- Written by: Kurt Sutter; Jack LoGiudice
- Cinematography by: Paul Maibaum
- Editing by: Jordan Goldman
- Production code: 1WAB07
- Original air date: October 22, 2008
- Running time: 45 minutes

Guest appearances
- Ryan Hurst as Opie Winston; Theo Rossi as Juice Ortiz; Mitch Pileggi as Ernest Darby; Dayton Callie as Wayne Unser; Emilio Rivera as Marcus Álvarez; Dendrie Taylor as Luann Delaney; Jamie McShane as Cameron Hayes; Kevin Alejandro as Esai Alvarez; Francis Capra as Mayan Hitman; Stuart McLean as Devon; Jay Karnes as Josh Kohn

Episode chronology
← Previous "Old Bones"	Next → "Hell Followed"

"The Pull" is the eighth episode of the first season of the FX television series Sons of Anarchy. Written by Kurt Sutter and Jack LoGiudice, directed by Guy Ferland, it originally aired on October 22, 2008, in the United States.

The title of the episode refers to the gathering of money the episode is centered on, and also refers to Jax and Tara acting upon their attraction to each other. The season three episode titled "The Push" is also named after a significant event in Jax and Tara's relationship.

== Plot ==
Darby receives an envelope from Kohn which contains a file on SAMCRO's dealings with the True IRA. He sets up a meeting with Alvarez and offers to give him the information if the Mayans kill Clay, which would allow the Nordics to gain a foothold in Charming while the Mayans would take over the gun-running business. Alvarez is hesitant at first, but Darby assures him that law enforcement will not investigate too closely as they will be pleased that criminals are wiping each other out. Alvarez accepts the offer and tells his son, Esai, to kill Clay as well as Darby.

SAMCRO are collecting the $70,000 needed to secure another shipment of weapons. A sizeable portion of the money comes from an unwilling Luann, while the rest arrives later that day when Jax comes across a truck driver badly beaten on the highway. He says that the Nordics took his tanker truck because he owes money to them. Jax and Opie then steal the truck back and sell it to Wayne Unser for a knock-down price. Meanwhile, Half-Sack steals an unattended ambulance in a bid to pay back his debt and earn his patch, but the club dismisses the stunt as pointless and unnecessarily risky. Jax goes to the hospital to visit Abel, who Tara says is healthy enough that Jax can hold him for the first time. Gemma worries that Jax and Tara are renewing their relationship.

Clay and Tig set up a meeting with McKeavey at a local Irish bar. They are instead met by Cameron Hayes, McKeavey's cousin, whom informs them that McKeavey has been beaten to death in Oakland on the orders of the port authority boss, Brenan Hefner. The deal goes ahead nonetheless, but as they raise their drinks to their fallen comrade, two Mayan gunmen come in through the door. They fire at Clay but are gunned down by Tig and the shotgun-toting barman; Cameron is shot in the buttocks. Simultaneously, the Mayans assault Darby's house and shoot a Nord footsoldier and two women, but Darby survives and manages to escape.

The Sons realize that the Mayans and Nordics are allied, and that war is imminent. However, Clay and Tig are worried about Jax's commitment to a gang war. Jax assures them that he is fully committed to SAMCRO, but also voices his worries over violence destroying the club. Clay decides to call in Sons leaders from Washington, Utah and Nevada in a bid to wipe out the Mayans. Meanwhile, the stolen ambulance is used to bring Cameron to the clubhouse for medical treatment. Jax says he will get medical supplies from Tara while Chibs, a former British Army medic, will perform the surgery to remove the bullet.

Jax picks up the medical supplies from Tara's house. After he leaves, Kohn, having entered the house undetected, emerges from Tara's bathroom and coerces her into having sex with him. Tara plays along and, at the earliest opportunity, reaches for his gun and shoots him in the stomach before calling Jax for help. When Jax arrives, he assures Tara that Kohn will go to prison, though he will probably come back after being released. The injured Kohn taunts Tara by calling her a "biker slut" and Jax furiously shoots him in the head with his own gun. Tara and Jax then make love on the bed, Kohn's corpse lying on the floor nearby as his iPod repeatedly plays the Andy Williams song "Can't Get Used to Losing You". Meanwhile, back at the clubhouse, Tig and Opie prepare SAMCRO for war by readying their guns.

== Reception ==
Josh Kohn's death was voted #14 on E! Online's "21 Most Important Sons of Anarchy deaths", while the scene where Jax and Tara have sex near his dead body was voted #15 on Rolling Stone's "20 Best Sons of Anarchy Moments".
