= Out (Sons of Anarchy) =

- Sons of Anarchy episode
- Episode no.: Season 4 Episode 1
- Directed by: Paris Barclay
- Written by: Kurt Sutter
- Cinematography by: Paul Maibaum
- Editing by: Etienne des Lauriers
- Production code: 4WAB01
- Original air date: September 6, 2011
- Running time: 60 minutes

Guest appearances
- Rockmond Dunbar as Lt. Eli Roosevelt; Ray McKinnon as Assistant U.S. Attorney Lincoln Potter; Kenny Johnson as Herman Kozik; Tory Kittles as Laroy Wayne; Winter Ave Zoli as Lyla Dvorak; Michael Marisi Ornstein as Chuck 'Chucky' Marstein; David Labrava as Happy Lowman

Episode chronology
← Previous "NS"	Next → "Booster"

"Out" is the fourth season premiere of the FX television series Sons of Anarchy. It was written by Kurt Sutter, the original series creator, and directed by Paris Barclay. It originally aired in the United States on September 6, 2011.

This episode marks the first appearance of Rockmond Dunbar (Lt. Eli Roosevelt) and Ray McKinnon (Lincoln Potter)

== Plot ==
Jax, Clay and four other members of SAMCRO are released from prison after serving fourteen months for federal weapons charges. They return to Charming, California, and are disturbed by the sight of signs for a new real estate development, spearheaded by new mayor Jacob Hale Jr. and Elliott Oswald, whose land was seized for the project under eminent domain. On their way into town, they encounter Charming's new sheriff, Eli Roosevelt, who together with Assistant U.S. Attorney Lincoln Potter has convened a secret task force to shut down SAMCRO's gunrunning operation.

The parolees reunite with their families, including Jax's girlfriend Tara Knowles, who gave birth to a son, Thomas, while Jax was imprisoned. Jax proposes to Tara and reveals his desire to leave SAMCRO, fearing that staying with the club will send him back to prison or to an early grave. Clay resolves to stop the new housing development and sends Gemma to enlist the help of retired police chief Wayne Unser, who is severely depressed and dealing with advanced cancer with little outside help. Several SAMCRO members deliberately antagonize the police, tailing them to keep them from following Clay and Jax, who meet with their gun suppliers in the Russian mafia to broker a new deal.

Opie and his fiancée Lyla get married in a ceremony on an Indian reservation. During the wedding, Jax and Clay kill Russian crime boss Victor Putlova, while other members seize the Russian's guns and use them to wipe out the rest of the mafia. Meanwhile, in Stockton State Prison, imprisoned SAMCRO member Otto Delaney murders a Russian prisoner who shanked Jax during his incarceration.

== Reception ==
IGN gave "Out" an 8.5/10.0 rating, stating: "With a hint of things to come, the Hamlet-esque storyline that began in the pilot episode also reared its head when Gemma found the note Maureen Ashby sent home with Jax last season referring to details about his father that he doesn't know yet. Since this was one of the things that hooked me from the beginning of the show, I am looking forward to learning more about the truth of John Teller's death. If Tara's fear after reading Maureen's letters and Gemma's panic that Jax will find out are anything to go by, it is going to be big. "

Zach Handler of The AV Club gave "Out" a B+ rating, stating; "All in all, it’s a well-paced hour-plus of television, and it’s great to see everyone back to doing what they do best. (In the case of former sheriff and permanent friend of the Sons Unser, what he does best appears to be “suffering.”) There are some clunky lines of dialogue, and the urgency level is low, but if “Out” has a problem, it's that this is a very safe episode. There isn't really anything here that's all that shocking or intense—there are twists, but even the twists seem the usual routine."
