= Gemma Teller Morrow =

Fictional character from Sons of Anarchy

- Sons of Anarchy / Mayans M.C. character
- Katey Sagal as Gemma Teller Morrow
- First appearance: "Pilot"; Sons of Anarchy; September 3, 2008
- Last appearance: "Perro/Oc"; Mayans M.C.; September 4, 2018
- Created by: Kurt Sutter
- Based on: Gertrude (Hamlet)
- Portrayed by: Katey Sagal

In-universe information
- Nickname: Gem
- Occupation: Manager of Teller-Morrow Automotive Repair
- Spouses: John Teller; Clay Morrow
- Children: Jax Teller; Thomas Teller
- Relatives: Nate Madock (father); Rose Madock (mother); Nathaniel Madock (brother); Tara Knowles (daughter-in-law); Abel Teller (grandson); Thomas Teller (grandson)
- Religion: Christianity

Gemma Teller Morrow (née Madock) is a fictional character on the FX television series Sons of Anarchy, played by Katey Sagal. Gemma is the widow of John Teller, a founding member of the Sons of Anarchy Motorcycle Club Redwood Original (SAMCRO). At the beginning of the series, she is the matriarch of the club and wife of club president Clay Morrow and mother of Vice President Jax Teller. She is unapologetic about the lengths she'll go to in order to protect the club and is beloved by all of its members. Throughout the series, however, she has a tumultuous relationship with her daughter-in-law Tara Knowles, continuously affecting her relationship with Jax. Her character is based on Gertrude, the Queen of Denmark who is Prince Hamlet's mother from William Shakespeare's play Hamlet.

== Biography ==
Gemma was born to Nate and Rose and is a native of Charming, California; her maiden name is Madock. According to Police Chief Wayne Unser, she left Charming when she was sixteen and returned "ten years later with a baby and a motorcycle club". She was married to John Teller, a Vietnam War veteran and founder of the Sons of Anarchy Motorcycle Club, with whom she had two children: Jackson in 1978 and Thomas in 1984. Gemma has a scar on her chest which is explained when her grandson Abel has surgery. Gemma has a genetic heart disorder from her mother's side which she passed on to her children — Thomas died in 1990 from complications of the disorder, and Abel nearly died from heart complications and maternal drug abuse after his premature birth. After John was hit by a semi-truck and died in 1993, she quickly married John's friend and club member Clay Morrow. Her tough, but relatively classy, image includes hair highlights and a tattoo on her breast.

=== Sons of Anarchy ===
==== Season 1 ====
Gemma Teller Morrow is the queen of Charming and the matriarch of SAMCRO, Charming charter. A Machiavellian schemer and expert in psychological manipulation, Gemma is extremely protective of her son Jax and grandson, and she longs for the day when Jax, in her eyes, will be ready to assume control over SAMCRO to ensure the organization's survival for future generations. She adores her husband, Clay, and does her best to make things work out his way. Many of SAMCRO's plans succeed because of Gemma's quiet intervention (e.g., finding out who raped the little girl at the carnival in the episode "Fun Town", and surveillance of L.O.A.N. in season two). She generally has a hostile attitude toward all of Jax's female friends and partners, including his ex-wife Wendy; his on-again, off-again girlfriend Tara (although Gemma later takes Tara under her wing); and the club "groupies" with whom she occasionally has intercourse with. Nord boss Ernest Darby indicated that he had a prior romantic interest in her. She claims to be part Jewish "on the angry Russian side."

==== Season 2 ====
Early in season 2, Gemma is raped by Sons of Anarchy rival AJ Weston and two other unknown men wearing white masks. During the assault, Gemma is told to tell Clay that it will happen again if he does not end his dealings with minorities. Later, Gemma realizes Weston is one of her rapists, when she recognizes his tattoos. When her friend Unser finds her at the rape scene, Gemma demands that he not tell Clay or Jax about the rape so as not to play into AJ Weston and Ethan Zobelle's plans to get Clay and/or Jax to do something rash. Unser complies and further covers up the source of Gemma's injuries by crashing her car into a road divider and taking her to the hospital. The only other person whom Gemma confides in about the rape is Tara Knowles, Jax's girlfriend. Unser later realizes that Chief Deputy Hale is starting to become more involved with Zobelle and his people and tells Hale about Gemma's assault. This causes Hale to re-evaluate his dealing with Zobelle. The rape leaves Gemma with significant and visible emotional trauma, which causes problems in her marriage with Clay. She also feels somewhat paranoid that AJ might try to attack her again. Her paranoia is further compounded when someone from L.O.A.N. mails one of the rapists' white masks to her.

When Gemma learns of Jax's plans to become a Nomad, she tells him that she knows about the book her first husband, Jax's father John Teller, had written. She tells Jax she believes John's death may not have been an accident, but rather a suicide. After asking Jax to reconsider his decision, she implores him to read a certain page in John's book, hoping it will give him guidance and perhaps change his mind. The book fails to make Jax decide to stay and when the vote needed to allow him to leave is taken, it passes. Upon learning that Jax still plans to become a Nomad, Gemma calls together her son, Tara, and husband Clay at her home and reveals, fairly graphically, the details of her assault and gang rape. As a result, Jax picks up the jacket patches he had removed from his vest after the vote, which indicates that Jax has decided to stay with SAMCRO. The following morning, feeling unwanted by Clay, Gemma comes on to an emotionally wrecked Tig, who reciprocates her advances, but stops when he sees a picture of Jax and Thomas at the beach as children. Later, Tig is guilt-ridden and proceeds to confess to Opie about Donna's murder. Then, outside the church where Unser's support group meets, Gemma is approached by the priest who runs the support group; he offers her advice to serve others in order to deal with her own self-loathing. Back at the garage, she runs into Chibs, who is distraught about his dealings with ATF agent Stahl. She comforts him and advises him to come clean with the club. After the club meeting, Tig tells Clay, at the end of the day, that Gemma thinks he does not want her anymore; Clay proceeds to the office and shows that he still wants Gemma. When the club goes on lock-down, Gemma looks after other families. She tells Tara she (Tara) does not have to take crap from anyone, because she is the old lady of the vice president. Gemma has been teaching Tara, because she will one day be the queen of the club. Inspired by Gemma, Tara stands up to her supervisor at the hospital, assaulting her at one point when she calls Gemma a whore.

In the second-season finale, Gemma happens to come across Polly Zobelle. Wanting to get revenge and also do her part for SAMCRO, she follows Polly to Edmond Hayes' house. She sends Tara home and sneaks onto the property, where she finds a distraught Polly brandishing a gun. Polly attempts to shoot, so Gemma kills her in self-defense. She then discovers Edmond Hayes' body and ATF Agent Stahl, saying that both of them had a bloody day. Stahl offers to let her leave, but not before tossing her sidearm to Gemma, who catches it. Gemma instantly realizes Stahl's trick to get her fingerprints on the murder weapon, and flees. At a bus stop payphone, she calls Police Chief Wayne Unser for help. She is last seen fleeing Charming with Unser with no idea where to go.

==== Season 3 ====
Gemma is still on the run at the beginning of Season 3. Tig is keeping her at a motel until Clay and SAMCRO can figure out a way to clear her name. Clay elects not to tell Gemma that Abel has been kidnapped, because he believes she already has enough to worry about.

While at the motel, Gemma reads her mother's obituary in a newspaper, which disturbs her. Gemma's poor relationship with her mother is reinforced when Opie gives Jax his condolences for the loss, and Jax dismisses it, stating that "he hardly knew her that well."

Eventually, Gemma convinces Tig to help her sneak away. They end up in Oregon, at the house of her father, a reverend who is suffering from late-stage Alzheimer's disease. After an incident involving Tig and the Guatemalan caretaker, which results in Tig's being shot, Gemma requests Tara's assistance.

After the caretaker discovers that Gemma is wanted and that there is a hefty reward for her capture, Gemma ties her up in the basement of her father's home. Shortly thereafter, the caretaker escapes by overpowering Tara. The caretaker then attempts to overpower Gemma but is accidentally killed in struggle with Gemma and Tara.

Soon, Gemma makes the hard decision to move her father into an assisted living home. Gemma then breaks down, escapes in Tara's car, and contacts Agent Stahl.

Tara and Tig inform the club that Gemma has disappeared, and Jax realizes that she was heading home to be with Abel. However, upon returning home, Gemma discovers that Abel had been kidnapped. This aggravates her heart condition, and she ends up in the hospital. Gemma had made a deal to turn herself in to Stahl upon her return to Charming, in exchange for not receiving the death penalty for the murders of Edmund Hayes and Polly Zoebelle. However, Stahl reneges on the deal, informing Gemma that because she did not turn herself in at the agreed-upon time (because she was in the hospital), Gemma has violated the terms of the deal. Later, Jax secretly works out a deal with Stahl, wherein he will give Stahl information on the IRA and get her back in the good graces of the ATF, in exchange for help with his mother. (Stahl had been demoted and taken off the IRA case following the events at the end of season 2.) Stahl then supplies Jax with a statement for Gemma to give to the ATF, in which Gemma states the real events of the Hayes and Zoebelle shooting, except that Gemma fingered another ATF agent for the Edmund Hayes shooting.

In "Widening Gyre", Gemma finds out that John Teller had an affair in Belfast in the late 1980s, which produced a daughter. She makes up her mind to go to Belfast with Clay and Jax, and employs Tara's help in breaking out of police custody. After a tense standoff with Wayne Unser, Gemma successfully makes it to the airport with SAMCRO.

Once she and SAMCRO arrive in Belfast, the Sons are in danger of being deported to the US. When they are all in the van, Gemma forces a SAMBEL (Sons of Anarchy Belfast) member to run the police off the road. After SAMCRO's release from police custody, they head to the SAMBEL clubhouse, where Gemma meets Maureen and Trinity Ashby. Gemma and Maureen talk privately later, and Maureen tells Gemma they should continue to keep the secret about John's being Trinity's father. However, Jax and Trinity are attracted to each other, and Gemma tells him that Trinity is his sister, after finding them in a compromising position.

The next day Gemma, Jax, and Opie go to the orphanage to get Abel. When they get there, they are under orders of Father Ashby, who tries to prevent them from taking Abel home by lying about knowing where Abel is. Gemma sees right through this, takes the baby hostage, and threatens to kill Ashby. When the Irish finally tell where Abel is, Gemma gives the baby back, and Jax goes to find him. When Jax returns without Abel, he tells his mother that neither he nor Abel belongs there, and Abel belongs with the other family. Gemma is enraged that Jax is willing to give up his own son and tells him Tara is pregnant. When father Ashby shows up, it is revealed that Sean Casey was tortured, and the priest tells them that Jimmy is now after Abel. Everyone, including Gemma, tries to get to the hotel to save Abel, only to find they are too late. After a deal is made between Jimmy and the True IRA, Abel returns home with his true family.

Once back in Charming, the club is trying to find Tara, and Gemma is struggling with the deal Jax made with Stahl. Gemma knows it does not matter how much the rest of the club loves him; if they find out he is ratting, they will kill him without hesitation. Jax is still confident that nothing will go wrong and promises her that everything and everyone will be all right. Gemma, still afraid, decides to take Stahl at gunpoint and force to kill the deal, warning that if Stahl doesn't end the deal she will turn herself in and tell where her previous statement really came from. She later greets Tara and hugs her for her safe return from Salazar.

In the season 3 finale, Gemma is still worried about the deal Jax made with Stahl. When she sees that the deal is still on, and Jax is giving up the head of the IRA, she tries to turn herself in, only to find out that it is too late, because Stahl already gave her statement clearing her of the killings. Gemma warns Stahl that someone will get hurt.

When Clay comes to see Gemma in jail, she tells him they can't look at Jax the same way they saw John Teller, because club has been in desperate times. At the end, she sees Jax arrive with Stahl and watches with sadness as Stahl sets up Jax to die at the hands of his own club, by exposing the deal they made. But Gemma gets some relief after Jax sends her a letter explaining that he was never a rat; the deal was a trap the entire club was in on, and the only reason they didn't tell her was to keep her from being an accessory if things went awry. At the end, it is strongly insinuated, via a letter John wrote his mistress Maureen, that Gemma and Clay are responsible for John Teller's death.

==== Season 4 ====
At the beginning of season four, we see Gemma is continuing her duties as the Queen of SAMCRO. She is one of the first people, along with Tara, to welcome home the members of SAMCRO who had been in prison for fourteen months. She later visits Unser, who has sold his business and moved into a trailer in the woods. After she and Clay have sex to properly welcome him home, she tells him that Unser needs him and the club to go on living. Gemma later attends Opie's wedding. After the wedding, she goes to Jax's house to check on the boys and she finds a note that suggest Maureen Ashby gave John Teller's letter to Jax to read. The next day she tells Clay about what she found and he tells her not to worry about it. Later she discovers that Jax hadn't read them, but Tara has. She tells Tara that the letters will only hurt their family. But more piles on when Piney tells her about wanting the club to mule drugs. When she confronts Clay and tries to order him not to do it, he makes her know that she is not the boss of him. When the club goes to Tucson for the drug run, she confronts Piney about his beef with Clay and tells him to let it go before he gets himself killed, but he won't back down. In the next episode, Clay tells Gemma about the confrontation with Piney were Piney tells Clay he knows the truth about John Teller's death. She not only worries about the truth coming out, but also about Clay when he suggests killing Tara and Piney as they are they only other two people who know the truth. She talks him out of it. She later goes to Unser who she tells to get the letters as he too was involved in the murder of John by helping cover it up. Later, she goes to get the letters and discovers that Unser burned them. She shows the ashes to Clay, unaware that he read them.

Later in the season, Gemma discovers Piney's dead body and immediately knows it was Clay who killed him. She learns from Unser that Clay not only read the letters, but the ones he read were actually copies meaning Tara still has the originals. Unser wants to turn Clay in, but Gemma convinces him otherwise. Later she and Clay talk about the situation and she tells him that they will simply add Piney's death to their list of secrets and she will convince Tara to give her the letters. She makes Clay promise her that he will not hurt Tara.

The next day, Gemma sees Clay take money out of their safe and hours later someone tries to kidnap Tara. When Gemma confronts Clay, they end up fighting leaving Gemma badly beaten. Afterwards, Gemma realizes that Clay is beyond salvation and he has to die at the hand of the son. The next day, she learns that Jax and Tara are planning to leave SAMCRO and Charming. She also discovers that Wendy has returned and wants to be a part of Abel's life and confronts her. When Unser tells Opie what happened to Piney to get Opie to kill Clay she tells him to try to stop it, because she wants Jax to do it. Unser is unable to stop it and Clay ends up shot by Opie, but he survived. Gemma then convinces Tara to give her the letters. Once she has them she takes out the ones that implicates her and Unser and gives the rest to Jax. She tells Jax everything that Clay has done and then tells Jax to kill Clay and take his place at the head of the table as the president of SAMCRO. While Jax is reading the letters, Gemma and Tara talk and Tara lets her that she knew about Gemma's plan to keep them in Charming. When Jax comes out after reading the letters Tara gives Jax a way to kill Clay and tells him that once it is done to come take her and their sons out of Charming. He promises that he will. Gemma is forced to watch her plan to have Jax become the next president fall apart. When she asks what Tara is doing, Tara tells her everything Gemma taught her. Tara then tells Gemma that Jax is hers. The same day Gemma sees Jax in the hospital coming out of Clay's room and tries to beg him to stay and Jax tells her that he is not leaving and that Clay won't hurt her again. When she goes into the room she sees that Clay is still alive. Later, Gemma burns the letters that implicate her in John's death and when the men are having church she sees Jax at the head of the table and Tara standing behind him.

==== Season 5 ====
Gemma is now very independent from Clay as she is seen having sex with Nero Padilla in the very first scene, but it was later revealed that she had been consuming a great deal of alcohol and drugs, did not recall a thing from the previous night, tried to shoot Nero upon waking and had even given him a fake name. Later they officially introduce each other and she gives him her phone number. Once she arrives at her home she catches Clay digging through her belongings, claiming to be looking for a ring, then he asks for a moment of Gemma's time and after hearing him out, he tries to touch her and she drops him to the floor warning that he will never lay a hand on her again. She later organizes for SAMCRO to stay at Nero's day spa while they hide from the law in order to stop them from being alone and unprotected in prison, much against Tara's wishes, despite both Gemma and Jax explaining that if they were to go to prison they would most likely be attacked, if not killed. Clay, who still has feeling for her, comes over to pay Nero a visit; when Gemma arrives and sees Clay with an escort, she fights her. As a result, the police raid the brothel and gets everyone arrested. During the time Gemma is separated from Clay, she goes out and gets drunk and does drugs, one time, when Jax and Tara decide to go to the cabin to be alone, Jax insists that Gemma keep the boys, she agrees to do so, when she is driving, she drives under the influence of Marijuana and her vehicle goes off the road, injuring Abel in the process. When Jax and Tara hear the news, Tara believes that Gemma was driving stoned, but Clay lies saying that she was attacked instead. When Jax gets to the truth, he now knows that Gemma was driving stoned, as a result, they cut her out of their lives for good. However, Jax gives her a chance to get back into their lives by making her get back with Clay so he could get him to confess about a series of home invasions that he could possibly be behind to set up SAMCRO; Gemma is hesitant to go along with the idea but agrees to it, it also means shutting out Nero as well. Gemma's efforts to get Clay to confess seem worthwhile, after Clay confesses to SAMCRO that he was indeed behind the break ins, he is banished from SAMCRO once and for all, IRA boss, Galen O'Shay offers Clay to go to Belfast to oversee business deals for the true IRA, but on the condition that Gemma goes. Gemma slightly agrees to go along. As they are ready to leave, the police show up and arrest Clay for murdering Damon Pope, Gemma lies saying he went somewhere.

==== Season 6 ====
Throughout Season 6, Gemma struggles with keeping her family intact and works to stop Tara from leaving Charming with Abel and Thomas. Her relationship with Nero strengthens over time as Clay is in prison. Later, Gemma witnesses Clay's death at the hands of Jax, which causes her grief. When she learns from Wayne that Tara may have made a deal with the feds in exchange for evidence to put Jax behind bars, she confronts and kills Tara in a fit of rage before Eli Roosevelt rushes after hearing the fight from outside the house. He reveals the truth to her that Jax planned to surrender himself to the authorities so that Tara could attain immunity for her role in the murder of Pam Toric and be allowed leave Charming with their children to start a new life. Before Roosevelt can call in the murder, Juice kills him. The two leave the scene before Jax arrives that night to find his wife dead.

==== Season 7 ====
Gemma feels guilt over killing Tara and fears what will happen if the truth comes out. Forced to help Juice for his role in helping her, she hides him from the club for his own betrayal. While alone, she talks to herself as if she is having a conversation with Tara. When Jax is set free, she lies and says that the Chinese that killed Tara, which sets Jax off into starting an all out war with Henry Lin and eventually August Marks. As Abel struggles with Tara's death, he overhears Gemma tell Thomas that she was sorry for killing her, which torments him into cutting himself as a result. After child services find out about the cuts, he says Gemma did it. Jax learns the truth from Abel that Gemma killed Tara, which forces him to confront Juice in prison, who confirms that it is. After Juice calls Gemma to let her know what he told Jax, she leaves Charming and also Nero behind, but not before going to see Abel and giving him the SOA rings, in hopes of him one day joining the biker gang. After paying a visit to her dementia-ill father at a nursing home, she goes to her family home in Oregon to spend her final moments. Wayne follows her to Oregon in order to bring her back alive. Jax arrives shortly afterwards and kills Wayne in front of her when he refuses to leave. The two share some final words before Gemma goes to the garden in the back and is killed by Jax. Both her and Wayne's bodies are found by the police, after Jax tips them off to their whereabouts. In the final episode of the show, Jax finally undoes the damage that both Clay and Gemma had brought upon the club.

=== Mayans M.C. ===
Gemma has an uncredited non-speaking role in the pilot episode "Perro/Oc", in a flashback scene set 8 years before the events of the episode.
