= The Sleep of Babies =

- Sons of Anarchy episode
- Episode no.: Season 1 Episode 12
- Directed by: Terrence O'Hara
- Written by: Kurt Sutter
- Cinematography by: Paul Maibaum
- Editing by: Jacques Gravett
- Production code: 1WAB11
- Original air date: November 19, 2008
- Running time: 45 minutes

Guest appearances
- Drea de Matteo as Wendy Case; Ally Walker as June Stahl; Ryan Hurst as Opie Winston; Theo Rossi as Juice Ortiz; William Lucking as Piney Winston; Taylor Sheridan as David Hale; Sprague Grayden as Donna Winston; Dayton Callie as Wayne Unser; Emilio Rivera as Marcus Álvarez; Dendrie Taylor as Luanne Delaney; Keir O'Donnell as Lowell Harland, Jr.; Tory Kittles as Laroy Wayne; Dewin Jordan as Agent Smith; Julie Ariola as Mary Winston; Olivia Burnette as Homeless Woman; Marcos de la Cruz as Agent Estevez

Episode chronology
← Previous "Capybara"	Next → "The Revelator"

"The Sleep of Babies" is the twelfth and penultimate episode of the first season of the FX television series Sons of Anarchy. It was written by Kurt Sutter, directed by Terrence O'Hara and originally aired on November 19, 2008 in the United States.

This episode marks the final appearance of Sprague Grayden (Donna Winston).

== Plot ==
Abel is finally healthy enough to return home. Wendy walks in on a tender moment between Jax and Tara and realizes that Gemma is using her to get to Tara. Wendy confronts Gemma, then notifies Tara that she intends to mend her relationship with Jax and that Gemma is determined to sabotage Jax and Tara's relationship. Having sold all of their arms from Ireland and strapped for cash to pay for Bobby's legal defense, Clay plans to sell the club's own guns to the Mayans. In Oakland, Clay and Jax are to pick up the guns, while Tig and Opie drop off the money. However, Clay has given Tig orders to kill Opie. Eager to play both sides of the war between the Mayans and One-Niners, Clay also makes arrangements with Laroy Wayne - leader of the One-Niners - to ambush the sale. Clay and Jax escape the ambush unscathed, and when given the chance to kill Opie, Tig balks. Tig tells Clay that he didn't get a chance to kill Opie during the chaos of the ambush, so Clay orders Tig to finish the job after Abel's homecoming party and to make it look like a drive-by perpetrated by the One-Niners. Feeling guilty that Stahl's actions have framed an innocent man, Hale tells Unser about the bugs the ATF planted on Opie. He then angrily confronts Stahl, who is being pulled from the cold case. At Abel's homecoming, Tara kisses Jax in front of Wendy, and slaps Jax when he privately asks her not to rub their relationship in Wendy's face. Tara leaves, as does Opie and his family. Opie takes the kids home in Donna's car, and Donna takes Opie's truck to run some errands for Gemma, who is busy hosting the party. Unser shows up at the party and tells Clay that Opie is innocent. Clay attempts to call off the hit, but Tig misses the call and shoots at Opie's truck with an UZI, accidentally killing Donna. SAMCRO is quick to arrive at the crime scene, and as everyone consoles a devastated Opie, Jax shoots a furious glare at Clay, and Hale blames a shocked Stahl for Donna's death. Back at their home, Wendy consoles Jax and the two have sex.

== Reception ==
IGN gave "The Sleep of Babies" a 7.2/10.0 rating, stating, "A lot of things are going to change after this. Opie will be a different person, Agent Stahl will be gone and it looks like Deputy Chief Hale is starting to switch into becoming Unser (which was one of the easier transitions). But this episode was the show's chance to show what it was made of, and while some of the execution was good, it was mostly a letdown. If you're wondering where this show falls short, it's right here.".

Zach Handler of The AV Club gave "The Sleep of Babies" a B rating, stating; "The final scene over Donna's corpse was a beaut. Opie breaking down, Clay just wallowing in his mistake, Jax acting pissed. And man, Hale taking down Agent Smith with one freakin' punch. Hardcore. And how about Unser? That moment when he's talking to Clay while Opie sobs over his wife's corpse, when you realize that Unser knows exactly what happened. The guy may be a weasel, but he's not a stupid weasel."
