= The Revelator (Sons of Anarchy) =

- Sons of Anarchy episode
- Episode no.: Season 1 Episode 13
- Directed by: Kurt Sutter
- Written by: Kurt Sutter
- Cinematography by: Paul Maibaum
- Editing by: Hunter M. Via
- Production code: 1WAB12
- Original air date: November 26, 2008
- Running time: 60 minutes

Guest appearances
- Tom Everett Scott as Rosen; Ally Walker as June Stahl; Drea de Matteo as Wendy Case; Ryan Hurst as Opie Winston; Theo Rossi as Juice Ortiz; William Lucking as Piney Winston; Taylor Sheridan as David Hale; Dayton Callie as Wayne Unser; Keir O'Donnell as Lowell Harland, Jr.; Glenn Plummer as Vic Trammel; Tory Kittles as Laroy Wayne; Patrick St. Esprit as Elliot Oswald; Julie Ariola as Mary Winston; Olivia Burnette as Homeless Woman

Episode chronology
← Previous "The Sleep of Babies"	Next → "Albification"

"The Revelator" is the thirteenth and final episode of the first season of the FX television series Sons of Anarchy. The episode was directed and written by series creator Kurt Sutter. The episode originally aired on November 26, 2008 in the United States, and garnered 2.4 million viewers. The title of the episode is a reference to the name given to the author of the Book of Revelation – John of Patmos.

== Plot ==
Jax consoles Opie, who blames his choice to return to SAMCRO for Donna's death. Jax visits Tara at the hospital to check in on her and she breaks down, guilty over Kohn's murder and unsure about her future with Jax. She tells Jax of her plans to leave Charming, and he accuses her of using him to do her dirty work. Jax assures Tara that she is the only one he has ever loved. Gemma consoles a guilt-ridden Clay, but orders him to put on a strong face for his men. Opie's father Piney is eager to hit the One-Niners as 'revenge' for Donna's death, and demands satisfaction from Clay. Piney drives up to Oakland and demands a meeting with Laroy Wayne, and Clay sends Jax, Chibs, and Half-Sack after him to prevent him from making any messes. Wayne assures them that the Niners had nothing to do with Donna's killing. Bobby's lawyer Rosen warns Clay that Brenan Hefner's mistress is preparing to testify against Bobby and Opie, and Clay blackmails Elliott Oswald into helping SAMCRO figure out her identity so that they can silence her. Hale begs Unser to help him take down the club, but Unser flatly refuses, encouraging Hale to let the bikers serve their own justice. Hale reaches out to Jax and tells him that he suspects that Clay is guilty of ordering Opie's murder. Jax confronts Clay and demands the truth, but Clay lies and tells Jax to put it out of his mind for the good of SAMCRO. As Jax leaves the club, Juice informs him that Hefner's witness is a 17-year old girl, and Jax rushes off to prevent her assassination. He stops Happy, Chibs, and Tig just before they finish the job, and then tussles with Tig in the safehouse before leaving and drinking himself to sleep in the Charming graveyard. He wakes up and walks to Donna's funeral. Tara gives him his SAMCRO kutte and a kiss, and he shoots a knowing look at Clay, Gemma, and Tig before placing a flower on the coffin and walking off. Piney follows and hands Jax a fresh copy of his father's memoirs, declaring that it is "time for a change." Jax visits his father's grave and proclaims his agreement as Gemma and Clay look on, nervously.

== Music ==
The song, "John the Revelator", performed by Curtis Stigers and the Forest Rangers, plays over the ending scene.

== Reception ==
Seth Amitin of IGN gave "The Revelator" an 8.6/10 rating. Amitin explains that the episode was not as he previously expected and commended it overall, only finding a few small points of criticism. He finishes his review with a positive prediction for future seasons.

Zach Handler of the AV Club gave "The Revelator" a perfect A rating, similarly praising the final episode of the season. Handler goes into more detail summarising the episode, drawing points of success as he does and doesn't find any moments throughout the episode to criticise upon. Although Handler’s writing style is more colloquial than other reviews, this works in revealing his positive impression of the episode. Similar to Amitin, Handler also predicts future success for the series as he finishes his review with, "…it’s gonna be beautiful."
