= NS (Sons of Anarchy) =

- Sons of Anarchy episode
- Episode no.: Season 3 Episode 13
- Directed by: Kurt Sutter
- Written by: Kurt Sutter; Dave Erickson
- Cinematography by: Paul Maibaum
- Editing by: Etienne des Lauriers
- Original air date: November 30, 2010
- Running time: 57 minutes

Guest appearances
- Ally Walker as Agent June Stahl; Paula Malcomson as Maureen Ashby; Kenny Johnson as Herman Kozik; Titus Welliver as James 'Jimmy' O'Phelan; Winter Ave Zoli as Lyla Dvorak; Jeff Kober as Jacob Hale, Jr.; Michael Ornstein as Chuck 'Chucky' Marstein (credited as Michael Marisi Ornstein); David Labrava as Happy Lowman

Episode chronology
← Previous "June Wedding"	Next → "Out"

"NS" is the thirteenth and final episode of the third season of the FX television series Sons of Anarchy. It was written and directed by Kurt Sutter, the original series creator and co-written by Dave Erickson. It originally aired in the United States on November 30, 2010.

This episode marks the last appearance of Ally Walker (Agent June Stahl), Paula Malcomson (Maureen Ashby) and Titus Welliver as (James 'Jimmy' O'Phelan)

== Plot ==
Tara has become more involved with the club. She drives Jimmy O back to the garage in the trunk after SAMCRO buys him from the Russians. Jax makes sure that she wears a bulletproof vest to ensure her safety in case something goes wrong. When Stahl tells the club about the deal Jax made with her, which was actually a trap by the club to kill Stahl and Jimmy, she runs and hugs him distraught and fearing that the club will kill him in prison. With the help of Unser, Chibs Telford kills Jimmy O'Phelan in retribution for stealing his wife and daughter many years ago, before Opie forces a terrified Stahl in the front seat of the cop car. During this confrontation Stahl breaks down crying and begs Opie for her life, to which Opie responds, "This is what she felt." He then shoots Stahl in the back of the head with a MAC-10, instantly killing her, to avenge the death of his wife Donna. After this, Chibs rigs the scene to look as if the real IRA murdered Stahl and Jimmy. Tara reads letters from John Teller to his mistress Maureen Ashby, implying that Gemma and Clay would be responsible for his death should it happen. The rest of SAMCRO, enroute to prison, celebrate their victory over Jimmy and Stahl.

== Reception ==
IGN voted Agent Stahl's death #10 in their list of the biggest deaths, They said: "The ending of Season 3 was one of the more gratifying twists the show ever had. Things seemed bleak when Agent Stahl informed the club that Jax had made a deal and ratted them out. But what she didn’t know was that it was all a setup, one that ended with her dead as Opie got his revenge for her setting him up and getting his wife killed. The season ended on an unexpectedly up note as Clay and Jax smiled and the rest of the guys in the prison van shared a laugh. Sure they were on their way to prison, but Jax wasn’t a rat and Stahl was out of the picture for good."

Zach Handler of The A.V. Club gave "NS" an A− rating, stating; "What worked the best about 'NS' and what allows me to be optimistic about next season's potential, even while having largely mixed feelings on this season overall, is the ending. The episode doesn't manage to make all the IRA stuff feel organic, and Hal Holbrook doesn't pop back in to remind us about that basically innocent housekeeper that got murdered a while back, but it does introduce a new threat to the Sons, and, unlike Cameron and his Disappearing Baby Trick, this threat fits in beautifully with the context of the show overall. Maureen smuggled John's letters to her in Jax's backpack, and Tara found them. Reading them, while Jax and Clay grin at each other in triumph and while Gemma sits with her grandson in her arms, propped up like a queen on her throne, we hear Teller's voice-over again. It's long been hinted at that Clay and Gemma had something to do with John's death. This is a Hamlet riff, after all. And now Tara, the outsider who finally found her way to belonging, has reason to be suspicious. Makes you wonder what else is in those letters. And it makes you wonder what Jax'll do if he reads them."
