= Tara Knowles =

Fictional character from Sons of Anarchy

Tara Grace Knowles-Teller
- Sons of Anarchy character
- Maggie Siff as Tara Knowles-Teller
- First appearance: "Pilot" (2008)
- Last appearance: "A Mother's Work" (2013)
- Created by: Kurt Sutter
- Portrayed by: Maggie Siff; Holly Sherman (young)

In-universe information
- Nickname: Doc
- Title(s): M.D. F.A.C.S.
- Occupation: Attending Surgeon at St. Thomas Hospital; Pediatric Surgery; Neonatal Surgery; Trauma Surgery
- Spouse: Jax Teller
- Children: Abel Teller (stepson); Thomas Teller

Dr. Tara Grace Knowles-Teller is a fictional character on the FX drama Sons of Anarchy, played by Maggie Siff.

== Biography ==
Tara is a native of Charming, California. She mentions her heritage is half-Irish. Her mother died when Tara was nine and, according to ATF Agent Stahl, Tara had a "drunk daddy", whom Tara described as a "bit of a packrat". Tara was Jax Teller's high-school sweetheart, and during that era she had a crow tattooed on her lower back representing her connection to SAMCRO. Tara was arrested in Jax's company at least three times in 1996. She left town when Jax was 19, in order to get away from small-town life and the influence of the club. According to his mother Gemma, this broke Jax's heart.

After leaving Charming, Tara moved in with a cousin of her father's, who lived in San Diego, studied at UC San Diego, and graduated with honors. She then attended medical school in Chicago (either Feinberg Medical School at Northwestern University, according to her file in "Fun Town", or "Loyola Med" according to Agent Stahl in "Better Half") where she was at the top of her class, then she completed an internship at Chicago Presbyterian.

While in Chicago, Tara dated ATF agent Joshua Kohn, and got pregnant, and had an abortion at six weeks. Kohn became intimidating, violent, and obsessive, so she took out a restraining order against him several months before she returned to Charming, after an absence of 10 years.

=== Season 1 ===
Tara works as a Pediatric resident at the local hospital, St. Thomas. It is there that she tends to Jax's gravely ill infant son Abel during Abel's hospitalization.

Tara lives in her childhood home, which she inherited from her father when he died. She also drives a Cutlass her father had parked in the garage under "two tons of old newspapers".

Tara's relationship with Jax upon her return to Charming is based primarily on their mutual concern for gravely ill Abel. Her psychotic ex-boyfriend Agent Kohn comes to Charming under the pretext of investigating SAMCRO, but is really there because he wants to resume his relationship with Tara. Afraid for her life, Tara seeks Jax's help in driving off Kohn. Jax stabs Kohn's car on her behalf, beats him bloody in an altercation at Floyd's barber shop, and then escorts him out of town. When Kohn returns in the dead of night and attacks Tara in her home, she shoots him in the gut and calls Jax for help.

When Jax arrives he is furious about the attack and shoots Agent Kohn in the head. Tara and Jax then fall into each other's arms and have sex while Kohn's iPod plays the Andy Williams song "Can't Get Used to Losing You" on a continuous loop.

Following the killing of Kohn, Jax and Tara seem to settle into a largely healthy and positive romantic relationship. Tara spends more time with Jax at the clubhouse, plays nice with Gemma, and works to heal wounded club associate Cameron Hayes.

The Jax-Tara relationship soon seems to disintegrate after his ex-wife Wendy Case returns from rehab. In the penultimate season-one episode "The Sleep of Babies", Tara is seen sleeping alone while Jax and Wendy have sex. In the final episode of the first season, "The Revelator", Tara tells Jax that she has arranged to return to Chicago as she does not believe she is cut out for life in Charming. This angers Jax, and he storms off. At the end of the episode Tara is seen to have changed her mind, and she turns up at Donna's funeral, where she and Jax share a kiss.

=== Season 2 ===
Tara officially becomes Jax's "old lady" and is integrated into the club's world. After Gemma is raped and abused, she turns to Tara for medical help. Tara encourages Gemma to seek out counseling to deal with the psychological repercussions of the attack but Gemma is reluctant. Tara's help with Gemma combined with her efforts at raising Abel begins to heal the rift between Tara and Gemma. Tara's connection with Jax and SAMCRO, on the other hand, causes problems for her at work. When Gemma accidentally breaks Tara's nose after being startled, Margaret Murphy (a hospital administrator) assumes that Jax is responsible and warns Tara about the possible repercussions of being associated with SAMCRO. Later, Margaret files a "hostile work environment" complaint against Tara after Gemma confronts the administrator about the hospital's desire to move Chibs to another facility because of an insurance issue. Chibs later falsely complains of head pain and is able to stay at the hospital. Margaret accuses Tara of coaching Chibs with his symptoms and has Tara's privileges suspended.

When Jax decides that he wanted to go nomad, Tara is upset that he made the decision without consulting her. However, unlike everyone else connected to the club, she feels like it might be the right decision given the tension between Jax and Clay.

Gemma lets Tara know that as Jax's "old lady", Tara has considerable prestige and respect in the club when other women in the club defer to her, and that she shouldn't "take any shit" from anyone. Later, Tara confronts Margaret. The altercation turns violent and Tara then chokes and punches her. She tells Margaret, "I know where you live, I know where your kids go to school" and informs her that the cops are on SAMCRO's payroll and that the club runs Charming. Tara advises Margaret to keep her mouth shut and retract her complaint. Margaret immediately agrees to do so.

In the season two finale, Tara attempts to convince Gemma to not get revenge on those that raped her, but is unsuccessful. She is present at Jax's home when Cameron Hayes appears, and is tied to a chair by him before he kidnaps Abel Teller. Tara is untied by Jax and tells him what has happened to his son. Jax and the rest of the club unsuccessfully try to save Abel while Tara is later seen being consoled by Deputy David Hale.

=== Season 3 ===
Tara is still saddened by the loss of Abel. As time goes by, Jax continues to push her away with increasing vehemence. She feels Jax is pushing her away because he blames her for not preventing Abel's kidnapping. She visits a fugitive Gemma and helps her kill Gemma's father's caretaker. Tig helps the two of them cover it up. Tara later reveals to Gemma that she is six weeks pregnant.

After Jax leaves Tara, she catches him with CaraCara porn star, Ima. Tara then starts packing her things at Jax's house. He apologizes for what she saw earlier, but she feels he wanted her to see it, because he wants her gone and knew it was the one thing that would drive her away. She expresses that she thinks he is doing this because he hates her for what happened to Abel. Jax says that it is to protect her, but Tara doesn't believe him. When Jax goes after her, she is already pulling out of the driveway. As Tara leaves Jax's house it is shown that the recently ousted Calaveras MC leader, Hector Salazar, has been secretly stalking her and Jax.

Tara considers having an abortion, as she believes Jax is not ready for another child. Gemma tries to convince Tara to wait until Jax gets back from Belfast and look into Abel's eyes before she does anything. Gemma wants Tara to try to mend the relationship, because Jax hasn't been thinking clearly since Abel's abduction. Tara ultimately helps Gemma escape police custody so Gemma can go with Clay and Jax to Belfast.

Lyla asks Tara if she knows of any clinics that conduct abortions. When she goes with Lyla to have the procedure, they have a conversation about why Lyla is having the abortion. It turns out Lyla is having the same problems with Opie. He won't open up to her in fear of what might happen. Lyla also feels the baby is an inconvenience because she wants to continue working as a porn star. After the conversation, Tara schedules an abortion for herself, as well. Later, Tara reveals to Margaret Murphy that she is going to have an abortion; Margaret agrees it is a good idea and offers to drive Tara to the clinic. On the way, Salazar stages a car accident and abducts Margaret and Tara.

While Tara and Margaret are being held by Salazar, he becomes upset when his hostage demands aren't met and threatens to kill Margaret. Tara tries to persuade him not to and when he doesn't listen to her, she causes a distraction. She attacks Salazar's girlfriend and tries to get away. Salazar kicks her hard in the stomach. He goes to kick her a second time but stops when Tara tells him that she is pregnant.

When Tara gets a chance to go to the bathroom, she breaks off a piece of a mirror to use as a weapon. When Salazar's girlfriend breaks into the bathroom, Tara cuts her neck and almost escapes with Margaret, but Salazar stops them. After a stand off, Tara tells him his girlfriend is in the bathroom bleeding badly. She says she will keep his girlfriend alive if he lets Margaret go. When Salazar's girlfriend dies in the car, he throws Tara against the car and puts a gun to her head.

Salazar takes Tara to Jacob Hale's office, where he takes Hale hostage as well. When he gives his list of demands, one of them is for Jax to come to Hale's office. Tara sees Salazar pull out a knife, and he tells her he plans to kill her while Jax watches and then kill Jax. As Jax enters the office, Salazar is about to kill Tara, but Jacob Hale stabs him instead. Jax wrestles the gun from Salazar, gives it to Tara, and tells her to kill anyone who is not a cop. When the whole ordeal is over with Jax and Tara go to the doctor for an ultrasound to make sure the baby was not harmed. The baby is healthy and Jax and Tara hear the heartbeat and see the baby on the ultrasound. Jax and Tara then go to Gemma's house where Gemma hugs her. Tara sees Abel and happily holds him and welcomes him back home. In the season finale, Tara has become more involved with the club. She drives Jimmy O back to the garage in the trunk after SAMCRO buys him from the Russians. Jax makes sure that she wears a bulletproof vest to ensure her safety in case something goes wrong. When Stahl tells the club about the deal Jax made with her, which was actually a trap by the club to kill Stahl and Jimmy, she runs and hugs him distraught and fearing that the club will kill him in prison. In the closing minute of the season 3 finale, Tara reads letters from John Teller to his mistress Maureen Ashby implying that Gemma and Clay would be responsible for his death should it happen. The close up shot of Tara's face transitions to Jax's face, thus ending season 3.

Bridge between end of Season 3 and beginning of Season 4: By the end of season 3 when Jax and the other Samcro members were hauled off to prison, Tara is a little over 8 weeks pregnant. However, in a special feature "appisode" (titled: Tara and Piney)- that took place day 85 of Jax's incarceration; a pregnant Tara is shown about 5 months along. In this appisode, Tara goes to Piney for information on John Teller's death but is rebuked and told not to investigate further and that the past was "dead and buried" . In another special "appisode" (titled: Second Son) - which bridges the gap between seasons; Tara and Gemma visit Jax in prison. Tara has just given birth to baby Thomas, and she brings the baby to meet Jax for the first time. Jax is overjoyed. He apologizes for missing the delivery and promises he wouldn't miss anything important ever again.

=== Season 4 ===
Tara is waiting to greet Jax on his return home. When Jax arrives he and Tara spend a little time with Abel and Thomas before Jax has to go inside the clubhouse for a meeting. When Tara and Jax meet at their house later, they waste no more time and begin having sex. Jax then proposes to Tara by putting a ring on their son Thomas's finger. Before Tara can fully accept they have a serious talk about the future of their family. Jax explains that he is done with SAMCRO, but he has to stay until Clay steps down as president because he and Gemma won't let Jax walk away without conflict. He does assure her that as soon as Clay retires and once he has saved enough money to avoid living off his wife he will leave SAMCRO and they will start fresh as a normal family.

Later, at Opie and Lyla's wedding, Jax is the best man and Tara is the maid of honor. The next day Tara and Jax are having breakfast with their sons when they see on the news a story about four dead bodies found at the construction site of Charming Heights. She asks Jax to tell her all he knows about it. He tells her it was retaliation for him getting stabbed in prison. Later on she encounters Gemma in her office who asks why Tara is not wearing her engagement ring. Tara simply tells Gemma that she and Jax are just waiting for the right time to tell everyone. Later at the clubhouse a distraught Tara is reunited with Jax after he is rescued from the Russians. There she discovers, along with Jax, that the clubhouse had been trashed by Sheriff Roosevelt. To lighten up the mood she decides to announce the engagement.

During the season (and before) Tara has become more fearful of the consequences of being involved with SAMCRO and increasingly begins to think about the effect it will have on her son. This leads Tara to make the decision of leaving town with her son until things settle down. Tara is also conflicted about the letters from Maureen Ashby. Gemma has found out she has them and tries most of the season to obtain them and destroy them. Piney also shows interest in them as a way to blackmail Clay, but Tara keeps them protected. Clay finds out about the letters and he is so fearful of them getting out, that he takes out a hit on her life from Romeo. Eventually after confronting Gemma about the letters, Tara admits that she is not capable of showing the letters to Jax, feeling that if he knew who his father truly was, Jax would get deeper into the club out of guilt, therefore getting him further from her.

Tara eventually heads to a medical conference in Oregon and takes Abel and Thomas with her, most likely for an indefinite stay. Jax accompanies her and on the way there the assassins hired by Clay try to kill her. Tara survives thanks to Jax, however during the fight her right hand gets smashed in a van door. Her hand is repaired, but the nerves are terribly damaged. Her doctor affirms it is unknown if it is permanent but she feels otherwise and believes her career to be over. Jax, extremely upset himself, tries to comfort her, but Tara has become distant and asks him to leave her alone. She feels that now their future is set and they will never get out of Charming. She's later encouraged by Jax that everything will go as they had planned, which Tara barely believes.

During the day she's visited by Jax's ex-wife Wendy, who makes it clear that she wants to know Abel better, as she gave up custody but not the right to know him. This unnerves Tara who feels she is Abel's true mother and becomes fearful that Wendy will take him away from her. Wendy leaves her number and Tara smashes the vase of flowers, screaming in anger. She's later put under psych watch and restrained to her bed. Jax begins to feel at a loss as how to take care of and comfort her.

Later Gemma comes to see her and confesses that it was Clay who wanted her dead because of the letters, which she gives to Gemma. She reveals later to Gemma that she was fully aware of her plan to have Clay killed by Jax and hide the letters that involve her and Unser, to prompt Jax to stay as President. Tara gives Jax a blood thinner to inject into Clay, who is recuperating at St. Thomas. She then tells Jax, in front of Gemma, that he will kill Clay and come get her and the boys, so they can leave Charming forever. This plan fails as Jax is forced to stay due to the influence of Romeo Parada and Luis Torres who are undercover CIA agents. They need SAMCRO to provide weapons and transport drugs or they will crush the club. Understanding that Jax has to become President, Tara decides to remain with him. In the season finale, with Gemma watching Tara stands behind Jax at the head of the table, one arm draped around him, mirroring a photo of Gemma and John Teller.

=== Season 5 ===
Tara's hand is still in a cast, meaning that she's unable to perform surgeries. Despite losing ability to operate, she supports Jax as President of SAMCRO. The couple lacks certainty of "where it all goes," but Jax is clear that "no matter what happens, I want you to be my wife." Tara mocks the romanticism of a spontaneous wedding at Diosa to which Jax jokes, "I killed a Fed for you ... nothing says endless love like capital murder." A judge marries them in a quick ceremony with wedding rings that belonged to Gemma and JT. Tension rises between Tara and Gemma over controlling the family. Tara places Abel and Thomas in hospital daycare with Jax's support. Tara gains power by shutting out Gemma, who is not on visitor list at first. Gemma tries to hurt Tara by using Wendy to threaten a custody suit. Tara stands firm by warning Gemma not to hurt her or her family or Jax "might kill you." Tara strategically plans squashing RICO case with Lowen, Bobby and Jax. She volunteers at Stockton State Prison and asks Otto to recant his RICO statement.

Tara extends an olive branch to Gemma by placing her on daycare visitor's list and allowing her to watch the boys. Gemma is stoned when she wrecks her car with Abel and Thomas in the backseat. Tara punches Gemma when she confesses to being high while driving with the boys. Tara's fears intensify over the increasing threats to her family; she starts to defend and protect them in Gemma-like ways. Tara cuts her out of the family, but agrees to let Gemma back in if she helps Jax with getting intel from Clay on plot to undermine his leadership. Tara receives good prognosis for her hand and gets recruited for a surgical job in Oregon. Meanwhile, Otto agrees to Tara's plea on RICO if she will bring him Luann's crucifix.

Tara's career is on the line when she is investigated as an accessory to Otto's brutal murder of a prison nurse that was killed with Luann's crucifix. Jax assures Tara that they will get through the investigation just like they get through everything else to which she quips, "that's what scares me." She becomes guarded when Jax doesn't walk away after meeting his goal to save the MC with RICO shutdown. She is pressed to reply to the offer and internally struggles with moving on as it is the "last chance" for her and Jax to get out of Charming. While meeting to prepare Tara's defense, Lowen prompts Tara to think about legal custody of sons if anything was to happen to her. Tara agrees to Providence Health & Services job offer before telling Jax.

Wendy confronts Tara with reality of risk associated with MC and shows her the shoulder bruise from the force of Jax jamming a speedball needle into it. Tara gasps with shock realizing that Jax is losing his way. The prison nurse's brother, Lee Toric, confronts Tara at the hospital and threatens to avenge her death. More than ever, Tara needs someone trustworthy to name as guardian of her sons in case of imprisonment or death. Tara has no permanent nerve damage and will be able to operate again. Tara requests clarity from Jax who does not come clean about intimidating Wendy.

Gemma confronts Tara about Providence Health & Services offer and threatens Tara "I'm done with your power push." Gemma threatens to tell investigators that Tara planned the killing of an innocent nurse to reverse RICO. Tara enlists Wendy as guardian and is now more determined to pull her sons out of Charming's "cesspool." Jax disapproves of Wendy as Guardian, but Tara insists it is her 'job as an old lady to be strong ... when and where [he] can't be." She tells him she accepted a job offer in Oregon to spare them from becoming like Gemma and Clay, which will force the boys to relive their mistakes.

The season ends with Tara's arrest for conspiracy to commit Pamela Toric's murder.

=== Season 6 ===
The season begins with Tara dealing with the hardships of jail. Tara brutally beats an inmate who stole her blanket while minding her own business. She is later released, however her medical license has been revoked and she lost her job offer from Oregon.

After a number of failed attempts to get herself and her sons out of Charming (including a false pregnancy and subsequently faked miscarriage to bar Gemma Teller-Morrow from gaining custody of Abel and Thomas, should Tara go to prison), and after Tara and Jax's relationship was tested (Tara and Jax are having problems with her being behind bars for her involvement in the death of a nurse. Jax is seen at the end of episode 1 cheating on Tara with Colette Jane, an escort handler) Tara finds herself at odds with everyone she was supposed to be able to trust and chooses to use the bullet she pulled from Bobby Munson's shoulder as evidence necessary to grant her witness protection, in turn making her a rat and a liability to the MC and to Jax himself. In a last-minute plot twist, Jax finds Tara at a park in Lodi. They talk for several minutes and then the scene cuts to the motel room Tara had been hiding in. The two come to an understanding and Jax surrenders himself to the mercy of DA Tyne Patterson in exchange for Tara's immunity for all the crimes she committed on behalf the MC, specifically that of the murder of Pamela Toric, for which she was accused in season 5 but did not have anything to do with. The DA agrees to what Jax offers her after a few moments of reluctance to believe that he will come through. With that, Jax has let Tara know that he truly loves her and their sons more than anything. They cry and have sex. Tara and Jax agree to meet the DA at the Teller home at 6pm after he spends his last hours as a free man with his sons. He tells Chibs and Bobby he will most likely be sentenced to 25 years, with parole in 10, 7 if he's lucky. Tara gets home earlier than expected and the house is empty, save for Eli Roosevelt, the sheriff, who entered the house with her so they could talk in private and he could help her bring her suitcases into the house, as she decided not to run away and do what Jax asked of her; raise their sons.

When Roosevelt leaves, stating he'll be outside, Tara calls for Wayne, assuming his truck outside meant he was in the house. Caught off guard, Gemma comes out of the laundry room and lunges for Tara, who cannot escape in time. Gemma hits her with an iron but doesn't knock her out. Tara struggles against Gemma's beating and her head is badly smashed on the sink, where Gemma then attempts to drown her. In one of the show's most gruesome moments, Tara struggles for several seconds before Gemma grabs a barbecue fork and stabs Tara multiple times in the back of her head and neck. With blood gushing out of the back of her head, Tara collapses and dies.

Roosevelt walks in on the scene and discovers Gemma sitting on the floor next to Tara's body, in obvious shock. Gemma is mumbling incoherently about how it had to be done because she was going to rat out the MC. Roosevelt tells her she didn't rat out the MC, and that Jax is giving himself up to protect her. Immediately after this, Juice walks in, shoots Roosevelt twice in the back and then comforts Gemma. After this he begins cleaning up the murder scene. Jax returns home later that evening. He sees Roosevelt's legs on the kitchen floor, draws his gun, and then enters the kitchen, where he finds both Roosevelt and Tara dead on the floor. Stunned and heartbroken, he drops his gun at Roosevelt's feet and begins sobbing as he cradles Tara in his arms.

== Reception ==
The New York Times' series-premiere review remarked on the "chemistry" between Jax and Tara, and described the character as "beautiful...refined and book-smart."

TV Squad credited Siff with a "superior performance" and the Chicago Tribune described her as "excellent."
