= Pilot (Sons of Anarchy) =

- Sons of Anarchy episode
- Episode no.: Season 1 Episode 1
- Directed by: Allen Coulter; Michael Dinner
- Written by: Kurt Sutter
- Cinematography by: Jonathan Freeman; Edward Pei
- Editing by: Hunter M. Via; Sidney Wolinsky
- Original air date: September 3, 2008
- Running time: 56 minutes

Guest appearances
- Drea de Matteo as Wendy Case; Ryan Hurst as Opie Winston; Theo Rossi as Juice Ortiz; David Labrava as Happy Lowman; William Lucking as Piney Winston; Sprague Grayden as Donna Winston; Dendrie Taylor as Luann Delaney; Mitch Pileggi as Ernest Darby; Glenn Plummer as Vic Trammel; Emilio Rivera as Marcus Álvarez; Tory Kittles as Laroy

Episode chronology
← Previous —	Next → "Seeds"

"Pilot" is the pilot episode and series premiere of the FX television series Sons of Anarchy. It was written by series creator Kurt Sutter, and directed by Allen Coulter and Michael Dinner. It originally aired in the United States on September 3, 2008, and garnered 2.5 million viewers.

== Plot ==
In the town of Charming in San Joaquin County, California, outlaw motorcycle gang the Sons of Anarchy Motorcycle Club, Redwood Original (SAMCRO), loses a shipment of automatic weapons and their warehouse is destroyed by a rival club, the Oakland-based Mayans. Jax Teller, the vice-president of SAMCRO, witnesses the resulting explosion.

The next morning, Sheriff Vic Trammel – who is on SAMCRO's payroll – tells club president Clay Morrow that the warehouse was destroyed by arson, showing him the bodies of two women who were hiding beneath the building. Clay instructs Trammel to set up a meeting with the One-Niners, an African-American street gang who buy weapons from SAMCRO. In Oakland, One-Niners leader Laroy Wayne, who needs SAMCRO's guns to control the local heroin trade, reluctantly gives Clay more time to replace the lost weapons.

Meanwhile, Jax has moved into SAMCRO's clubhouse after separating from Wendy Case, his pregnant ex-wife who is addicted to methamphetamine. In his family's storage unit, Jax finds old photographs of his late father and Sons of Anarchy founder, John Teller, as well as a manifesto written for Jax detailing the history of the club and John's disillusionment with the increasing violence. SAMCRO member Juice Ortiz traces the stolen guns to a Mayans warehouse in San Leandro.

Jax's mother, Gemma Teller Morrow, finds Wendy unconscious; she is hospitalized and her baby, Abel, is delivered ten weeks premature via caesarean section. Jax's former high school sweetheart, Dr. Tara Knowles, tells Jax that Abel has a heart defect which, combined with Wendy's drug abuse, gives him just a 20% chance of survival. Angry, Jax and other SAMCRO members confront local drug dealers, the White supremacist Nords; Jax brutally beats a Nords member for selling the meth to Wendy.

In preparation for the planned assault on the Mayans warehouse, Jax asks his best friend and lapsed club member Opie Winston to come along. Opie, an explosives expert, reluctantly agrees as he was recently released from a five-year prison sentence and promised his wife, Donna, he would not become reinvolved with SAMCRO's criminal enterprise. However, Donna confronts Opie after discovering him rigging explosives; Jax interferes and tells Opie to stay home and takes the explosives.

At a club meeting, Jax suggests that SAMCRO look into other ways of earning money, but Clay prioritizes retrieving their stolen weapons. Jax tells Gemma about John's writings. That night, Gemma warns Clay about the manifesto and wants to prevent Jax from straying from SAMCRO. The following day, Clay, Jax and Bobby Munson meet with Nords leader Ernest Darby and warn him to keep his drug dealing out of Charming. At the hospital, Tara recommends that Abel's heart surgery happen immediately. Gemma confronts Tara and the two argue, with Tara claiming she is not interested in becoming romantically involved with Jax.

In San Leandro, Clay, Jax, Tig Trager and Chibs Telford find their guns and the Mayans' stash of heroin. However, a group of guards show up, resulting in a shootout. The guard Jax shoots is discovered to have a swastika tattoo, and SAMCRO deduces he is a members of the Nords. Jax is hesitant to kill the man, so Clay steps in and shoots him. Jax uses the explosives to blow up the Mayan warehouse, and SAMCRO rides back to Charming.

Tara performs a successful surgery on Abel and Gemma visits Wendy, ridiculing her. Wendy says that she will get clean, but Gemma threatens her, saying that if she tries to get custody of Abel, she will kill her; Gemma gives Wendy a hypodermic needle. Jax returns to the hospital and is overjoyed to find Abel is alive. He embraces Tara, while Wendy has an overdose in her hospital bed.

== Production ==
Originally, Scott Glenn was cast in the role of Clay Morrow and an entire pilot episode was filmed with him. However, series creator Kurt Sutter decided to go in a different direction with the character and re-cast Ron Perlman in the role, and Clay's scenes were re-shot. Additionally, Emilio Rivera was originally cast as a Sons of Anarchy club member named "Hawk," who eventually evolved into the character of Tig Trager. Also, the One-Niners street gang who buy weapons from SAMCRO first appeared in The Shield, which Sutter produced.

== Reception ==
IGN gave the pilot a 7.2/10 rating, stating, "At first blush, Sons of Anarchy is not nearly as assured or gripping as The Shield. Charlie Hunnam is excellent as Jackson, and Perlman and Sagal are great as usual. The show looks good, the dialogue occasionally crackles and the story has rich possibilities. However, the show rides very close to being self-parody. While Jackson might be having second thoughts about the Sons lifestyle – the show itself is certainly in love with the bikes, the guns, and the brutality. This isn't good enough to recommend without reservation – but if you need to get your manliness on- this might be just the thing."
