= Aon Rud Persanta =

- Sons of Anarchy episode
- Episode no.: Season 6 Episode 11
- Directed by: Peter Weller
- Written by: Chris Collins & Kurt Sutter
- Cinematography by: Paul Maibaum
- Editing by: Doc Crotzer
- Original air date: November 19, 2013
- Running time: 64 minutes

Guest appearances
- CCH Pounder as Tyne Patterson (special guest star); Rockmond Dunbar as Eli Roosevelt (special guest star); Michael Marisi Ornstein as Chuck Marstein; Timothy V. Murphy as Galen O'Shay; Niko Nicotera as George 'Ratboy' Skogstrom; Rusty Coones as Rane Quinn; Jacob Vargas as Allesandro Montez; Douglas Bennett as Orlin West; LaMonica Garrett as Deputy Sheriff Cane; Blake Robbins as Mitch Glender

Episode chronology
← Previous "Huang Wu"	Next → "You Are My Sunshine"

"Aon Rud Persanta" (Irish for Nothing Personal) is the eleventh episode of the sixth season of Sons of Anarchy. It first aired on November 19, 2013 in the United States.

This episode marks the final appearance of Clay Morrow (Ron Perlman).

== Plot ==
Clay is broken out during his prison transfer, an event during which Bobby gets shot. Jax exacts his revenge on the Irish and Clay for past wrongdoings. Patterson is dissatisfied with how Jax upheld his end of the deal and threatens to void it. Tara contemplates making a deal of her own to stay out of jail and leave Charming with her sons.

== Reception ==
IGN's Diana Steenbergen gave the episode a 9.5/10 rating, stating, "A powerful episode of Sons of Anarchy delivered more than one shocking moment with the focus on Jax bringing SAMCRO’s dealings with both Clay Morrow and the Irish gunrunning business to an end." Zach Handlin of the A.V. Club gave the episode a B+ rating, while Allison Keene of Collider gave it an A−.
