= Clay Morrow =

Fictional character from Sons of Anarchy

- Sons of Anarchy character
- Ron Perlman as Clay Morrow
- First appearance: "Pilot" (2008)
- Last appearance: "Aon Rud Persanta" (2013)
- Created by: Kurt Sutter
- Based on: King Claudius
- Portrayed by: Ron Perlman

In-universe information
- Title: President (season 1-4)
- Affiliation: Sons of Anarchy Motorcycle Club
- Spouse: Gemma Teller Morrow

Clarence "Clay" Morrow is a fictional character in the FX television series Sons of Anarchy, portrayed by Ron Perlman. One of the "First 9" members of the titular outlaw motorcycle club, he spends the first four seasons as a primary protagonist, serving as president of the Sons of Anarchy Motorcycle Club Redwood Original (SAMCRO), charter based in the fictional town of Charming, California. After a series of antagonistic actions, Clay is stripped of his presidency, expelled from the club, and later killed by his stepson, Jax Teller. His character is based on King Claudius, the King of Denmark and Prince Hamlet's uncle and step-father from William Shakespeare's play Hamlet.

== Character ==
Of the "First 9" Sons of Anarchy (SOA) Motorcycle Club members, Clay was the youngest. He joined the US Army as a paratrooper in 1969 and was deployed to Vietnam until 1972. When he returned from service, he remained a member of the SOA and settled in Charming, opening the Teller-Morrow Automotive Repair shop with John Teller, the club founder and his best friend.

In 1993, he became president of SAMCRO after the death of John Teller. He went on to marry John Teller's widow Gemma Teller Morrow in the mid-1990s. It is later revealed that Clay and Gemma had been having an affair for some time prior to John's death, and they sabotaged his motorcycle in an effort to remove him from power. Under Clay, SAMCRO becomes more of a criminal organization, holding sway over the town of Charming with an iron fist.

He suffers from osteoarthritis (degenerative arthritis) in his hands that he attempts to mitigate via cortisone injections, but which slowly worsens as the series progresses. He makes several attempts to hide it to protect his position.

=== Season 1 ===
SAMCRO's lucrative arms trafficking business is disrupted after their storage warehouse is burned down and their guns are stolen by the Mayans, an enemy motorcycle club (MC) based out of Oakland. SAMCRO tracks the guns to a Mayan property, culminating in a shootout. The Nordics, a local White supremacist gang, is revealed to be working with the Mayans to destroy SAMCRO. SAMCRO escapes with the weapons and destroys the building using explosives.

Meanwhile, SAMCRO is being investigated by David Hale, deputy chief of the Charming Police Department, breaking a decades long agreement between SAMCRO and corrupt police chief Wayne Unser, who has cancer and will soon be retiring. Local businessman Elliot Oswald goes to Clay after his 13-year-old daughter is raped and asks SAMCRO to hunt down the culprit. Oswald tries to castrate the rapist but cannot bring himself to do it, so Clay steps in. He then frames Oswald, using the knife with his fingerprints on it as leverage to prevent Oswald from selling land to corporate entities.

When an ATF agent arrives in Charming and begins investigating the club, Clay decides to move SAMCRO's weapons to Indian Hills, Nevada, where an allied MC, the Devil's Tribe, are based. To protect the guns and the Devil's Tribe from the encroaching Mayans, he decides to merge the Tribe into the Sons of Anarchy (SOA). The Mayans retaliate and shootout ensues, with the SOA emerging victorious. Clay is arrested by the ATF after Teller-Morrow is connected to a prison convoy ambush; Jax and Piney Winston sold AK-47s to members of a right-wing militia who used them to free one of their members and kill three police officers. ATF raids SAMCRO's clubhouse, but Clay is later released after no evidence connecting him to the crime is found.

As Clay attempts to expand SAMCRO's gun business, he is almost killed when the Mayans attempt to assassinate him while he is meeting with gun supplier Cameron Hayes of the IRA. Clay makes plans to wipe out the Mayans. However, Clay is arrested and brought to jail where Ernest Darby, leader of the Nordics, is also being held. Clay tells Unser to bring in Mayans president Marcus Álvarez in order for the three gang leaders to hold a meeting and hopefully prevent further bloodshed. Clay succeeds; the Nordics stand down and SAMCRO will begin selling guns to the Mayans, ending all Mayan-SOA disputes.

However, ATF raids the clubhouse again after Bobby Munson is arrested for the murder of Oakland Seaport commissioner Brenan Hefner as a favor to the IRA. Clay and Tig mistakenly suspect Opie Winston of being the witness who identified him. Tig finds a recording device in Opie's mobile phone and truck, both planted by the ATF without Opie's knowledge. Clay gives the order for Tig Trager to kill Opie.

Despite the apparent SOA-Mayan truce, Clay meets with the One-Niners street gang and they discuss driving the Mayans out of Oakland. They plan to have the Niners ambush the Mayans at an arms deal. However, when SAMCRO meets Álvarez and his crew at a warehouse in Oakland, the Niners try to take out both the Mayans and SAMCRO. Tig attempts to kill Opie during the chaos, but finds himself unable to do so. Later at Jax's son Abel's homecoming party, Tig follows Opie's truck and mistakenly kills Opie's wife, Donna.

SAMCRO's lawyer meets with Clay and tells him that the ATF has put out an arrest warrant on Opie and that he and Bobby will most likely get convicted of Hefner's murder because of the prosecution's key witness. Using the blackmailed knife, Clay forces Elliot Oswald contact a friend in the US Attorney's office to find the safehouse location. Jax prevents the witness from being killed by SAMCRO, but threatens her into leaving the state. Clay, who has been butting heads with Jax for weeks, is confronted about Donna's death; Clay denies responsibility, instead claiming it was the One-Niners.

=== Season 2 ===
Clay struggles with remorse for Donna's murder, and continues to have growing strife with Jax who deduces Clay is responsible after he and Piney confirm the Niners are innocent. Clay convinces Opie a Mayan killed Donna, and convinces Jax to play along for the sanctity of SAMCRO. Meanwhile, Clay and SAMCRO are threatened by the League of American Nationalists (LOAN) white separatist group leader Ethan Zobelle, who demands SAMCRO stop selling guns to people of color. After Clay rebuffs this, Zobelle's lieutenant AJ Weston abducts Gemma and she is gang raped.

After Opie learns the truth about Donna from Tig, Clay asks for forgiveness and Opie agrees. Piney attempts to kill Clay, but is forgiven upon Opie's request. Meanwhile, Clay and Jax continue to grow apart, and Clay attempts to shutdown SAMCRO's newest legitimate business venture spearheaded by Jax, a pornography production company called Caracara. Clay and Jax's tensions eventually erupts over disagreements regarding how to deal with LOAN and Donna's murder; SAMCRO is arrested after Clay leads them into a trap in an attempt to kill Zobelle. Gemma convinces Oswald to post SAMCRO's bail, and Jax decides to leave SAMCRO to join the SOA's nomadic charter. However, after Gemma reveals the rape to Clay and Jax, they settle their differences and work together again. SAMCRO kills Weston and ambushes the Mayan convoy protecting Zobelle; Clay spares Alvarez's life. Clay and the others corner Zobelle in a restaurant, but abandon the mission after learning Jax's son Abel has been kidnapped by IRA gun dealer Cameron Hayes.

=== Season 3 ===
SAMCRO travels to Belfast to find Abel, learning the baby is being used as leverage between the IRA and rogue IRA member Jimmy O'Phelan. Clay kills McGee, member of the First 9 and President of the Belfast SOA charter, for his treachery against the club. Returning to Charming, Clay and SAMCRO initiate a plan against ATF Agent Stahl and Jimmy O'Phelan, culminating in their murders. Clay and some of the other SAMCRO are sentenced for their attack on Zobelle and are imprisoned in the California Department of Corrections.

=== Season 4 ===
Clay is seen as one of the many SAMCRO members released from prison. He later escapes their sheriff tail and accompanies Jax and Opie's meeting with the Russians, where he settles their differences and forms a partnership with them. He attends Opie's wedding and goes to test a new gun given to them by Putlova. As he's firing the gun he turns and shoots Putlova's bodyguards and Jax stabs Putlova to death as revenge for trying to kill him in prison. He also tells Gemma that his arthritis has gotten worse and that he has only 1 or 2 years left before he has to step down as President of SAMCRO. Also, while in prison, he set up a deal to run cocaine for the Gallindo Cartel, but this does not sit well with the other members of the club, as SOA avoids drugs. When the club goes to Arizona and meets the Tucson charter, SAMTAZ, he demands that the charter stop dealing meth. This request is denied, as selling generates too much money for the club to give up. Otto wants Luann's murderer dead, and the issue is raised in the chapel. Clay is then confronted by Piney, who threatens Clay that if Clay does not kill the cocaine deal with the Gallindo Cartel, Piney will distribute letters to the club about John Teller's murder to the other members. Clay discusses the threat with Gemma, revealing that Clay did kill Teller. Clay later meets Unser and obtains the letters from him, unaware that Gemma has the same plan. After Unser gets a copy of the letters, he confronts Clay. Clay replies he does not regret doing what he did because it protected the Club and Charming. When he visits a tied Georgie Caruso, he claims that he has connections with millionaire Japanese families. Clay immediately sees an opportunity to make Jacob Hale believe he has investors in time. His idea is that he will have the investors pull out at the last minute, which will put an end to Charming Heights. After retrieving the last brick of cocaine that Juice had stolen, framing Miles for it, Clay asks Romeo for help killing Tara, to keep the secret of the letters hidden.

Clay comes to Piney's cabin in the night. After discussing trust issues and differences in the cabin, Clay leaves, only to break down the door, knocking Piney off his feet. Piney begs Clay not to get Tara involved in the letters from JT. Clay shoots Piney in the chest with a shotgun, killing him. This makes Piney the 3rd member of the First 9, and the 2nd and final co-founding member of the Sons of Anarchy to be killed at the hands of Clay. Clay leaves the markings of the cartel to implicate them for the murder. Given the club's difficult circumstances, Clay calls the Irish Kings for a meeting to set a new deal that lets them survive the war against Lobo Sonora. He later learns that the One Niners have been dealing with the Sonora and the Sons plan an attack using the Niners to lure them. This fails, however, as Sonora's men were equipped with grenade launchers. Luis, Romero's right-hand man, gives Clay a cell phone with his contact to kill Tara. Jax confronts Clay when he hears from Bobby that Clay wanted Bobby, instead of Opie, as president as was the deal. Clay says it is Tara's fault that Jax changed, but Jax warns him to never insult her like that again. Gemma tells Clay that Tara will not reveal the letters to Jax for fear that Jax will get deeper into the club out of guilt. Clay promises to Gemma he won't hurt Tara, however he uses the cell phone Luis gave him, and the next morning pays the contact 25,000 dollars for the murder. After finding out that Jax and the babies are with her, Clay desperately tries to stop the hit, but is unsuccessful and Tara has her hand broken by a car door while struggling to escape. Clay meets Romeo and gets a refund, with Romeo taking the matter into his hands personally, and Clay reluctantly agrees that Tara is best dead. Gemma confronts Clay about the hit and a violent fight ensues between the two, including Gemma shooting at Clay (deliberately missing) and getting in a powerful punch and a kick against Clay, with Clay getting injured, but Clay gets the upper hand and severely beats Gemma's face. That night he decides to sleep in the clubhouse. Opie later finds out that Clay was behind the death of Piney and seeks revenge, ending up shooting Clay in the torso twice. Clay survives the shooting but is shown to be in intensive care. Later in the episode Gemma gave Jax his father's letters to Maureen Ashby. After reading the letters, and realizing Clay is responsible for the death of John Teller, Jax vows to kill Clay. Jax puts a knife up to Clay's throat and makes him step down as President and orders him to never go near his family again. Although Clay tries to explain his reasons, Jax refuses to listen and takes his President patch, thus ending Clay's reign as President of SAMCRO.

=== Season 5 ===
Clay is shown to have been discharged from the hospital, but requires an oxygen tank due to his lung injury. He is shown trying to make amends with Gemma, but she coldly brushes him off. He later reveals to the club he murdered Piney, but states that Piney was drunk and tried to kill him first and Opie found out and is the one who shot him. The club's rules (due to him having killed a member) means they must vote on kicking him out. When Jax questions his motives for telling the club, he denies any. His arthritis is shown to have reached the point to where he can't ride his bike at all. He later goes to his and Gemma's burglarized house and expresses concern over his safe being stolen. He then goes and visits Opie and convinces him not to walk away from the club because of him, seeing as though he's "half dead already". He later finds out where Gemma has been going from Juice. He goes to the brothel and confronts Nero, the owner and Gemma's new suitor. He then "seeks comfort" with a young prostitute to anger Gemma. Gemma then attacks the girl causing her to leave. When Nero's operation is later shut down, and he and Gemma are arrested, it's likely Clay was behind it.

The next episode "Small World" shows Clay having recovered to the point of no longer needing his oxygen tank, though he continues to wear it (either for sympathy or to keep people off-guard). He later helps Gemma take care of a dead body (Nero's half-sister) and the two seem to be on better terms. At the end of the episode, he confronts the three Nomads responsible for the Charming burglaries and the death of Sheriff Roosevelt's wife. He punches one in the face exclaiming "You weren't supposed to kill her!" This shows Clay to have been pulling the strings behind the home invasions. The next episode "Toad's Wild Ride" reveals the Nomads, (Go-Go, Greg and Frankie) made a deal with Clay to help him get back at the head of the table in exchange for a cut of Clay's share of the guns and cocaine money. The break-ins were Clay's way of turning Charming against Jax. When Unser (who has been investigating the break-ins) comes close to discovering the truth, Go-Go and Greg meet with Clay to discuss killing him, while Frankie goes underground. Clay meets with Unser in his trailer talking about the trust and friendship between them. When Go-Go and Greg break in the door, Unser shoots Go-Go with a double-barreled shotgun and Clay betrays them, shooting Greg in the head with his pistol. When Juice (who saw Go-Go and Greg going to Unser's trailer) asks Clay what is happening, Clay denies involvement. Jax and the rest of the club find out about their attack on Unser and Jax privately accuses Clay of using the Nomads to undermine his leadership. Clay states that Pope is the one who hired the Nomads, Jax claims they'll find Frankie and learn the truth. In "Ablation" Clay visits Gemma, Abel, and Thomas in the hospital after a marijuana-induced car crash. He tells Jax that a truck ran her off the road to protect her. When Jax learns about the lie, he tells Clay he understands why he lied and that Gemma is dead to his family, and he wants him to take care of her. "Andare Pascare" shows the club discovering that Frankie is hiding with a Mafia family, paying them with money stolen from Nero. They take a unanimous vote to kill him after extracting the information they need. When Clay learns from Jimmy Cacuzza the location of a Mafia safehouse where Frankie is hiding, Clay and Juice go there to kill him to keep him from outing Clay (Juice acting under the pretense of scouting it out). When Frankie barricades himself in the house and shoots at the two, Clay drives the van into the gas tank outside, blowing up the house. Just as Clay is about to kill Frankie, Jax and the others show up, having seen the explosion. However Frankie is quickly gunned down by the enraged Mafia Don for killing one of his men before he can tell them anything. Bobby later asks Clay if there's anything he wants to tell him (implying he also knows about his dealings with the Nomads). When Clay claims his conscience is clear, Bobby states "I hope you're as smart as you think you are, cause I'm sicking of burning friends". The episode ends with Gemma coming to Clay to help him with his cortisone shots.

The next episode "Crucifixed" shows Clay negotiating with Romeo and Luis for protection as once the RICO case is gone, he will no longer need Clay and will most likely kill him. Romeo suggests getting rid of Jax and putting Clay back at the head of the table. Clay disagrees to taking the deal, Romeo states "Yes you will." Later, Gemma and Clay draw closer at Clay's place, where Gemma insists they return home. They are last seen sitting on their bed talking, where Clay confesses he can't bear losing her again. Gemma kisses him passionately and they sink onto the bed. The next episode "To Thine Own Self" shows Clay learning of Otto's murder of a nurse, ending the RICO case. He is shown, for unknown reasons, trying to save Jax from Romeo and warns him to work with the cartel long enough to make the Club legitimate and leave. He refuses stating "I'm done bowing down to greedy men who have nothing to believe in". When Jax reveals a new deal to the Club, which would allow the Mayans and Triads to take over muling the cocaine and selling big guns, respectively, Clay votes yes along with everyone else. He is later shown moving legal documents given to him by the Nomads to another location, to protect himself from the Club finding this important evidence of his betrayal. The end of the episode shows Bobby going to Clay and Gemma's house to talk to him about "trying to keep you alive." It's revealed in "Darthy" that Bobby convinced Clay to confess his role in the Nomad attacks in exchange for vetoing his death: club-sanctioned assassinations (known as "A Visit from Mr. Mayhem") require a unanimous vote. Clay also meets with Gaylen, tells him he plans on starting his own crew to run any guns SAMCRO doesn't pick up, and asks for a plane to Belfast to wait out any immediate danger. He also gives Juice a gun that he values for all he has done for him. At the end of the episode, Clay has been voted out of the club after revealing everything. After Jax beats Clay in frustration for not being allowed to kill him, Happy removes the former Club President's SAMCRO tattoos on his back and arm by smudging them over with a needle and black tattoo ink as the rest of the club looks on.

He is shown to be ready to leave in the season finale when Roosevelt and several policemen state they found his gun (the same one he gave Juice) at a crime scene as the murder weapon that killed Damon Pope and three of his men. When he asks Gemma to vouch for him, she states he was gone with the gun and she didn't know he was going to kill anyone. He is arrested and is last seen in a prison transport van with two black men. Meanwhile, Jax has convinced Pope's lieutenants that Clay was Pope's killer; per Pope's standing order in the event of his death, they offer a $5 million reward for Clay's murder.

=== Season 6 ===
At the beginning of the season, Clay is being held in protective custody after his arrest for Damon Pope's murder. Clay is visited by retired US Marshal Lee Toric, the brother of the nurse Otto murdered. Toric, who had sworn revenge against the motorcycle club, tells Clay he can only remain in protective custody if he cooperates in building a case against SAMCRO. Clay initially refuses, but after being transferred to general population and realizing he is certain to be murdered in retaliation for two deaths he had nothing to do with and didn't even approve, he agrees to help Toric and is returned to protective custody. He later demands a sit-down with Gemma and Jax before he signs the deal. He meets with Gemma and seems apologetic, though Gemma suspects he has ulterior motives. He meets Jax and states that he will give Toric nothing and that he is sorry. In response to this he is shipped to Stockton, where he is attacked by three black men, but they spare him and offer him a shank. He later uses it to kill a member of a Neo-Nazi group and gets protection from the black gang. He is visited once more by Toric, who shows him the brutalized Otto. Clay slips Otto a shank and leaves. Despite threats that he will meet the same fate, Clay refuses to sign. Toric is later killed by Otto with the shank Clay gave him and Otto is killed by the guards in response.

Following the fallout between Jax and the IRA, Clay is contacted by Galen O'Shea with the opportunity to continue as the main weapon distributor for the IRA in Northern California. The IRA will arrange to have Clay escape from the prison transport on the way to his hearing and he will retreat to Belfast and build his own new crew. Clay requests a conjugal visit with Gemma so that he can have her relate this information to Jax. He pays off two guards to allow him to chat with Gemma, but when the visit is over, the guards demand to watch Clay and Gemma have sex while they masturbate. They threaten to have Clay killed and Gemma grudgingly agrees to do it. Afterwards Clay vows to kill the two guards, but Gemma tells him that SAMCRO needs him alive. When Clay's transport date is moved up, Galen enlists SAMCRO to assist in attacking his transport truck to free him; Bobby is shot during the attack and Juice kills a guard. After meeting up with the Irish, Jax kills Galen and his men. He explains the situation, stating the Club took a unanimous vote how to handle the situation. Clay, accepting of his fate, stands ready. Jax then executes Clay by shooting him in the neck and then five times in the chest while he is on the floor. Jax then arranges the bodies to make it look like Clay had a falling out with the Irish and they all died in a shootout, allowing him to finally get revenge against Clay as well as Galen.

== Development ==
Originally, Scott Glenn was cast in the role of Clay Morrow and the first pilot episode was filmed with him. However, series creator Kurt Sutter decided to go in a different direction with the character and re-cast Perlman in the role, and Clay's scenes were re-shot for the pilot episode that aired.
