= Fun Town =

- Sons of Anarchy episode
- Episode no.: Season 1 Episode 3
- Directed by: Stephen Kay
- Written by: Kurt Sutter
- Cinematography by: Paul Maibaum
- Editing by: Jacques Gravett
- Production code: 1WAB02
- Original air date: September 17, 2008
- Running time: 45 minutes

Guest appearances
- Drea de Matteo as Wendy Case; Theo Rossi as Juice Ortiz; Taylor Sheridan as David Hale; Mitch Pileggi as Ernest Darby; Dayton Callie as Wayne Unser; Patrick St. Esprit as Elliot Oswald; Judith Hoag as Karen Oswald; Liana Liberato as Tristen Oswald; Kevin Chapman as Michael McKeavy; Jim Cody Williams as Uncle Vinky; James Carraway as Floyd; Jay Karnes as Josh Kohn

Episode chronology
← Previous "Seeds"	Next → "Patch Over"

"Fun Town" is the third episode of the first season of the FX television series Sons of Anarchy. It was written by Kurt Sutter, directed by Stephen Kay and originally aired on September 17, 2008 in the United States.

This episode marks the first appearance for Jay Karnes (Josh Kohn), an ATF agent from Chicago, Illinois.

== Plot ==
When Tristen - the teenage daughter of prominent Charming businessman and landowner Elliott Oswald - is raped during a visiting carnival, Oswald turns to SAMCRO for justice. The police look to Tristen for answers, but her parents protest, fearing that the case will attract media attention. SAMCRO's IRA connection arrives in Charming with a truckload of AK-47 rifles, hidden in oil barrels shipped from Dungloe, Ireland. After Wendy regains consciousness, Tara prods her to find out if Gemma supplied her with heroin. Gemma brings Wendy flowers and warns her not to tell Tara anything. Gemma then visits Tristen and her mother, and convinces them to reveal the rapist's identity. SAMCRO hunts down the rapist, a carnival clown, and brings him to Elliott, who brings a special knife normally used to castrate bulls which he planned to use to castrate the rapist. When Elliott has a change of heart and backs down, Clay performs the castration himself, then bags the fingerprinted knife to use as blackmail against Elliott, as Clay worries that property developers interested in Elliott's land will bring unwelcome attention to Charming.

== Reception ==
In a review for the episode, Film School Rejects said "What we are really seeing with Sons of Anarchy, as I explained yesterday, is the slow build to the big burn."

The scene where Clay castrates a rapist was voted #18 in Rolling Stone's "20 Best ‘Sons of Anarchy’ Moments".
