= Kurt Sutter =

American screenwriter, director, producer, actor, podcaster

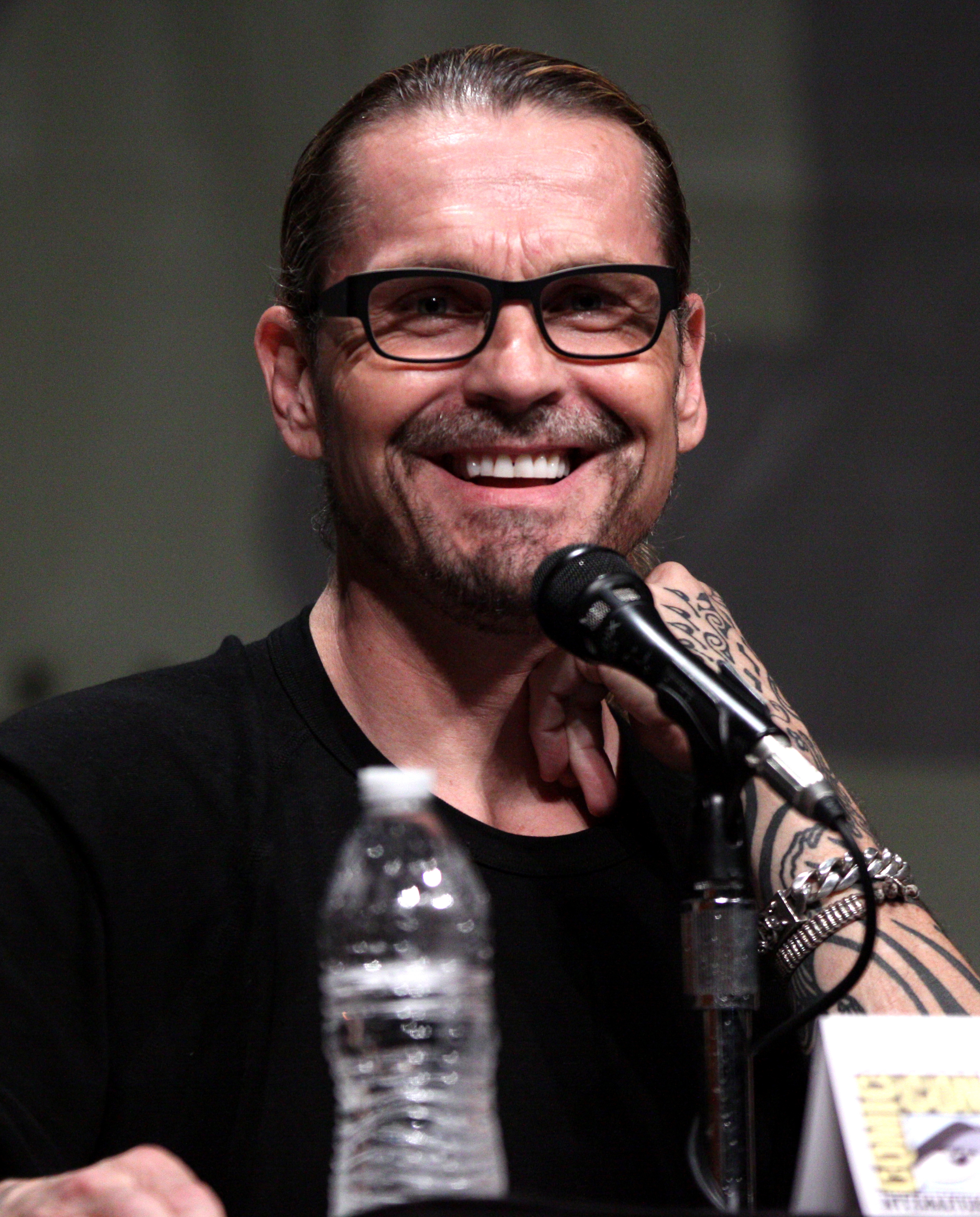
- Sutter in 2012
- Born: 1960 (age 65–66); Rahway, New Jersey, U.S.
- Education: Rutgers University; Northern Illinois University
- Occupations: Screenwriter; director; producer; actor
- Years active: 1980s–present
- Known for: The Shield (2002–2008); Sons of Anarchy (2008–2014)
- Spouse: Katey Sagal (m. 2004)
- Children: 1

Kurt Sutter (born 1960) is an American screenwriter, director, producer, and actor. He worked as a writer, director, and executive producer on The Shield, and appeared on the show as hitman Margos Dezerian. Sutter is also the creator of Sons of Anarchy and its spinoff Mayans M.C. on FX; he wrote, produced, and directed the series, as well as played incarcerated club member Otto Delaney. Sutter spent time with members of an outlaw motorcycle club in Northern California as research for Sons of Anarchy. Sutter's wife, actress Katey Sagal, played main character Gemma Teller.

== Early life ==
Sutter was born in Rahway, New Jersey. His father worked at the General Motors plant in Linden, New Jersey, and his mother was a secretary for the Roman Catholic Archdiocese of Newark. He has two older sisters. He grew up in the township of Clark, New Jersey, and graduated from Roselle Catholic High School in 1982.

Sutter attended Livingston College for the journalism department of Rutgers University—which was located there—eventually graduating from Rutgers University with a BA in mass media with a minor in English in 1986. He moved to New York City and studied Meisner technique, did theater, and taught at the Gately/Poole Conservatory. Sutter then attended Northern Illinois University for three years, starting in 1997, to obtain his M.F.A. in performance and directing.

== Career ==
Sutter was hired as a staff writer for the first season of FX crime drama The Shield in 2002. He made his television acting debut with the episode "Blowback", in which he appeared as Armenian mob hitman Margos Dezerian. He co-wrote the episodes "Dragonchasers" and "Two Days of Blood" with fellow staff writer Scott Rosenbaum, and was promoted to story editor for the second season in 2003. He wrote the episodes "Scar Tissue" and "Dead Soldiers", and in 2004 he joined the production team in the junior role of co-producer for the third season. He continued to write episodes, scripting "Playing Tight" and "Mum" with series creator and executive producer Shawn Ryan; creating "Slipknot" solo; and writing "Fire in the Hole" with consulting producer Charles H. Eglee. Sutter reprised his role as Dezerian in the season's final episodes "All In" and "On Tilt".

Sutter was promoted to supervising producer for the fourth season of The Shield in 2005. He wrote the episode "Grave" solo; co-wrote the story for the episode "Judas Priest" with Eglee; and co-wrote the teleplay with Rosenbaum. He co-wrote the story for the season finale "Ain't That a Shame" with Ryan; Ryan co-wrote the teleplay for the episode with co-executive producer Glen Mazzara. Sutter became a co-executive producer for the fifth season in 2006. He wrote the episode "Extraction"; co-wrote the episode "Trophy" with Renee Palya and Tony Soltis; and co-wrote the season's penultimate episode "Fire in the Hole" with Eglee.

Sutter became an executive producer for the sixth season in 2007, directed a promotional mini-episode for that season titled "Wins and Losses," and wrote the sixth-season premiere "On the Jones". He co-wrote the episode "Exiled" with Rosenbaum, also now an executive producer.

Sutter returned as an executive producer and writer for the seventh and final season in 2008. He wrote the premiere "Coefficient of Drag", and he co-wrote the episode "Parricide" with Gary Lennon. At the close of the season Sutter was the series' second most prolific writer (after Ryan), having written or co-written 18 episodes total.

Also in 2008, Sutter created and executive produced a new series for FX titled Sons of Anarchy. The show centers on the titular motorcycle club in a fictitious town called Charming in California. He was the series head writer and showrunner. Along with the pilot episode he wrote the episodes "Seeds", "Fun Town", "Capybara", "The Sleep of Babies", and the season finale "The Revelator". He would go on to write 61 of the show's 92 episodes. Sutter appears in the show as incarcerated club member Otto Delaney, and he cast his wife Katey Sagal in the starring role as the club's matriarch Gemma Teller Morrow. Sutter also hired several crew members with whom he had worked on The Shield, including unit production manager and producer Kevin G. Cremin, post-production supervisor and producer Craig Yahata, and directors Guy Ferland, Stephen Kay, Gwyneth Horder-Payton, Paris Barclay, Terrence O'Hara, and Billy Gierhart. The first season also featured The Shield star Jay Karnes as a recurring special guest star playing ATF Agent Joshua Kohn. This is a trend that continued in later seasons with the majority of the main cast of The Shield appearing in later episodes in a variety of different roles.

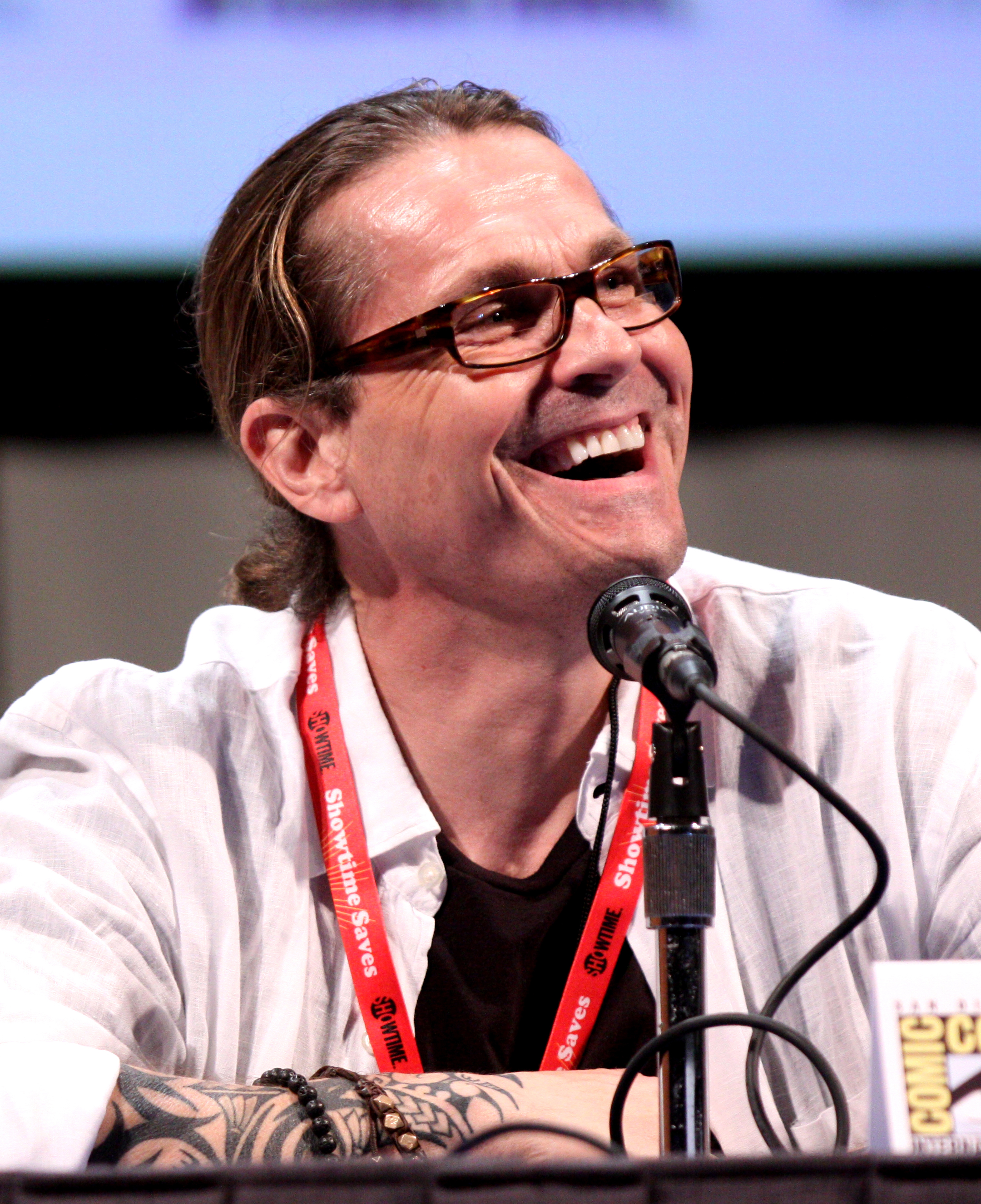
Sutter at San Diego Comic-Con in 2011

Sutter remained showrunner and executive producer for the series' second season in 2009. He wrote the season premiere "Albification", co-wrote the episode "Eureka" with Brett Conrad, co-wrote the episode "Gilead" with co-producer Chris Collins, co-wrote the episode "Potlatch" with Misha Green, co-wrote the teleplay for the episode "Service" with co-executive producer Jack LoGiudice from a story by Brady Dahl and Cory Udica, co-wrote the episode "The Culling" with consulting producer Dave Erickson, and wrote and directed the season finale "Na Trioblóidí". The second season featured The Shield star Kenny Johnson as a special guest star playing a club member named Kozik.

Sutter returned as showrunner and executive producer for the third season in 2010. He wrote the season premiere "SO"; co-wrote the episode "Oiled" with Erickson, now a co-executive producer; co-wrote the episode "Home" with Liz Sagal, series' star Katey Sagal's sister and his sister-in-law. He co-wrote the episode "Widening Gyre" with co-producer Regina Corrado and the episode "Lochan Mor" with Erickson and Liz Sagal. He wrote the story for the episode "Turas"; the teleplay was co-written by Collins (now a producer) and Dahl. Sutter co-wrote the episode "Firinne" with Vaunn Wilmott and the episode "Bainne" with Corrado and Erickson. He wrote the story for the episode "June Wedding"; Collins wrote the teleplay. Sutter reprised the role of Otto in the season finale, titled "NS", which he also directed and co-wrote with Erickson. Johnson returned as Kozik in the third season. Sutter would go on to produce seven seasons of Sons. The show concluded airing in December 2014.

In 2010, DreamWorks picked up Sutter's film script Southpaw, and Eminem was eyed for the lead role. The film was dropped by DreamWorks in 2011 and was later picked up by MGM and Columbia Pictures. Antoine Fuqua directed the film, and Jake Gyllenhaal replaced Eminem in the lead. Rachel McAdams, Rita Ora, 50 Cent, and Forest Whitaker also appeared in the film. Southpaw was released on July 24, 2015, by The Weinstein Company.

In 2014, it was announced Sutter had begun developing The Bastard Executioner, a new series for FX, The series was ordered to pilot on December 12, 2014. Katey Sagal, Lee Jones, and Stephen Moyer signed on to join the cast of the pilot. On May 22, 2015, the pilot was ordered to series with a 10-episode launch to premiere on September 15, 2015, on FX. The series was cancelled after one season. Sutter went on to create the Sons of Anarchy spinoff Mayans M.C. In October 2019, he was fired from FX after multiple complaints were lodged against him about his "abrasive" and "unprofessional" behavior. Sutter appeared in the 2021 science fiction film Chaos Walking, his first feature film acting role.

=== Comic books ===
In 2016, Sutter produced a six-issue comic book miniseries with Boom! Studios titled Lucas Stand. The first issue was released on June 1, 2016. He also worked on a comic book called Sisters of Sorrow; the book was launched at the 2016 San Diego Comic-Con.

== Projects in development ==
In May 2021, it was announced that Sutter would direct a horror film titled This Beast for Netflix. In November 2021, it was announced that he would create a western series titled The Abandons for Netflix.

== Influences ==
Sutter has stated he's had multiple influences in his writing style, including William Shakespeare, specifically his play Hamlet. He based the characters of Sons of Anarchy on Hamlet. Other cultural influences include Mad Magazine, Hanna-Barbera cartoons, and the television show Hill Street Blues, among others.

== Personal life ==
Sutter moved to Los Angeles in 2000. Sutter married actress Katey Sagal in a private ceremony on October 2, 2004, at their home in Los Feliz, California. Their first child, daughter Esme Louise, was born January 10, 2007. Esme was carried by a surrogate mother.

Sutter is an animal rights activist and is vegan. He is also a motorcycle enthusiast.

== Filmography ==
=== Film ===
Year	Film	Actor	Director	Writer	Role(s)	Notes
2015	Southpaw	No	No	Yes	N/A	
2021	Chaos Walking	Yes	No	No	Cillian Boyd	
TBA	This Beast	TBA	Yes	TBA		

=== Television ===
==== Actor ====
Year	Film	Role	Notes
2002–2004	The Shield	Margos Dezerian	4 episodes
2008–2013	Sons of Anarchy	"Big" Otto Delaney	20 episodes
2015	The Bastard Executioner	The Dark Mute	9 episodes

==== Producer ====
Year	Show	Role
2002–2008	The Shield	Credited as: Executive producer (Seasons 6–7); Co-executive producer (Season 5); Supervising producer (Season 4); Co-producer (Season 3); Story editor (Season 2); Staff writer (Season 1)
2008–2014	Sons of Anarchy	Executive producer
2015	The Bastard Executioner	Executive producer
2018–2023	Mayans M.C.	Executive producer
2025	The Abandons	Executive Producer

==== Writer ====
Year	Show	Season	Episode title	Episode	Original airdate	Notes
2019	Mayans M.C.	2	"Hunahpu"	10	November 5, 2019	
2019	Mayans M.C.	2	"Itzam-Ye"	9	October 29, 2019	Co-written with Elgin James
2019	Mayans M.C.	2	"Xbalanque"	1	September 3, 2019	
2018	Mayans M.C.	1	"Cuervo/Tz'ikb'ull"	10	November 6, 2018	
2018	Mayans M.C.	1	"Serpiente/Chikchan"	9	October 30, 2018	Co-written with Sean Tretta
2018	Mayans M.C.	1	"Murcielago/Zotz"	4	September 25, 2018	Co-written with Santa Sierra
2018	Mayans M.C.	1	"Escorpion/Dzec"	2	September 11, 2018	
2018	Mayans M.C.	1	"Perro/Oc"	1	September 4, 2018	
2015	The Bastard Executioner	1	"Effigy/Delw"	3	September 22, 2015	Co-written with Charles Murray and Nichole Beattie
2015	The Bastard Executioner	1	"Pilot, Part 2"	2	September 15, 2015	
2015	The Bastard Executioner	1	"Pilot, Part 1"	1	September 15, 2015	
2014	Sons of Anarchy	7	"Papa's Goods"	13	December 9, 2014	
2014	Sons of Anarchy	7	"Red Rose"	12	December 2, 2014	Co-written with Charles Murray
2014	Sons of Anarchy	7	"Suits of Woe"	11	November 18, 2014	Co-written with Peter Elkoff and Mike Daniel
2014	Sons of Anarchy	7	"Faith and Despondency"	10	November 11, 2014	Co-written with Kem Nunn and Gladys Rodriguez
2014	Sons of Anarchy	7	"What a Piece of Work is Man"	9	November 4, 2014	Co-written with Mike Daniels and Roberto Patino
2014	Sons of Anarchy	7	"The Separation of Crows"	8	October 28, 2014	Co-written with Peter Elkoff and John Barcheski
2014	Sons of Anarchy	7	"Greensleeves"	7	October 21, 2014	Co-written with Gladys Rodriguez and Josh Botana
2014	Sons of Anarchy	7	"Smoke 'em If You Got 'em"	6	October 14, 2014	Co-written with Mike Daniels
2014	Sons of Anarchy	7	"Some Strange Eruption"	5	October 7, 2014	Co-written with Roberto Patino
2014	Sons of Anarchy	7	"Poor Little Lambs"	4	September 30, 2014	Co-written with Kem Nunn
2014	Sons of Anarchy	7	"Playing with Monsters"	3	September 23, 2014	Co-written with Peter Elkoff
2014	Sons of Anarchy	7	"Toil and Till"	2	September 16, 2014	Co-written with Kem Nunn
2014	Sons of Anarchy	7	"Black Widower"	1	September 9, 2014	
2013	Sons of Anarchy	6	"A Mother's Work"	13	December 10, 2013	Co-written with Chris Collins
2013	Sons of Anarchy	6	"You Are My Sunshine"	12	December 3, 2013	Co-written with Kem Nunn and Mike Daniels
2013	Sons of Anarchy	6	"Aon Rud Persanta"	11	November 19, 2013	Co-written with Chris Collins
2013	Sons of Anarchy	6	"Huang Wu"	10	November 12, 2013	Co-written with Charles Murray
2013	Sons of Anarchy	6	"John 8:32"	9	November 5, 2013	Co-written with Kem Nunn
2013	Sons of Anarchy	6	"Los Fantasmas"	8	October 29, 2013	Co-written with Roberto Patino
2013	Sons of Anarchy	6	"Sweet and Vaded"	7	October 22, 2013	Co-written with Adria Lang
2013	Sons of Anarchy	6	"Salvage"	6	October 15, 2013	Co-written with Mike Daniels
2013	Sons of Anarchy	6	"The Mad King"	5	October 8, 2013	Co-written with Roberto Patino and Chris Collins
2013	Sons of Anarchy	6	"Wolfsangel"	4	October 1, 2013	Co-written with Kem Nunn
2013	Sons of Anarchy	6	"Poenitentia"	3	September 24, 2013	Co-written with Charles Murray
2013	Sons of Anarchy	6	"Straw"	1	September 10, 2013	
2012	Sons of Anarchy	5	"J'ai Obtenu Cette"	13	December 4, 2012	Co-written with Chris Collins
2012	Sons of Anarchy	5	"Darthy"	12	November 27, 2012	Co-written with Chris Collins
2012	Sons of Anarchy	5	"To Thine Own Self"	11	November 20, 2012	Co-written with Mike Daniels and John Barcheski
2012	Sons of Anarchy	5	"Andare Pescare"	9	November 6, 2012	Co-written with Liz Sagal
2012	Sons of Anarchy	5	"Toad's Wild Ride"	7	October 23, 2012	Co-written with Chris Collins
2012	Sons of Anarchy	5	"Orca Shrugged"	5	October 9, 2012	Co-written with Regina Corrado
2012	Sons of Anarchy	5	"Laying Pipe"	3	September 25, 2012	Co-written with Kem Nunn and Liz Sagal
2012	Sons of Anarchy	5	"Sovereign"	1	September 11, 2012	
2011	Sons of Anarchy	4	"To Be, Act 2"	14	December 6, 2011	Co-written with Chris Collins
2011	Sons of Anarchy	4	"To Be, Act 1"	13	November 29, 2011	Co-written with Chris Collins
2011	Sons of Anarchy	4	"Burnt and Purged Away"	12	November 22, 2011	Co-written with Dave Erickson
2011	Sons of Anarchy	4	"Hands"	10	November 8, 2011	Co-written with Chris Collins and David LaBrava
2011	Sons of Anarchy	4	"Fruit for the Crows"	7	October 18, 2011	Co-written with Liz Sagal
2011	Sons of Anarchy	4	"Una Venta"	4	September 27, 2011	Co-written with Marco Ramirez
2011	Sons of Anarchy	4	"Out"	1	September 6, 2011	
2010	Sons of Anarchy	3	"NS"	13	November 30, 2010	Co-written with Dave Erickson
2010	Sons of Anarchy	3	"June Wedding"	12	November 23, 2010	Story by Sutter, teleplay by Chris Collins
2010	Sons of Anarchy	3	"Bainne"	11	November 16, 2010	Co-written with Dave Erickson and Regina Corrado
2010	Sons of Anarchy	3	"Fírinne"	10	November 9, 2010	Co-written with Vaun Wilmott
2010	Sons of Anarchy	3	"Turas"	9	November 2, 2010	Story by Sutter, teleplay co-written by Chris Collins and Brady Dahl
2010	Sons of Anarchy	3	"Lochan Mor"	8	October 26, 2010	Co-written with Dave Erickson and Liz Sagal
2010	Sons of Anarchy	3	"Widening Gyre"	7	October 19, 2010	Co-written with Regina Corrado
2010	Sons of Anarchy	3	"Home"	4	September 28, 2010	Co-written with Liz Sagal
2010	Sons of Anarchy	3	"Oiled"	2	September 14, 2010	Co-written with Dave Erickson
2010	Sons of Anarchy	3	"SO"	1	September 7, 2010	
2009	Sons of Anarchy	2	"Na Trioblóidí"	13	December 1, 2009	
2009	Sons of Anarchy	2	"The Culling"	12	November 24, 2009	Co-written with Dave Erickson
2009	Sons of Anarchy	2	"Service"	11	November 17, 2009	Teleplay co-written with Jack LoGiudice from a story by Brady Dahl and Cori Udica
2009	Sons of Anarchy	2	"Potlatch"	8	October 27, 2009	Co-written with Misha Green
2009	Sons of Anarchy	2	"Gilead"	7	October 20, 2009	Co-written with Chris Collins
2009	Sons of Anarchy	2	"Eureka"	4	September 29, 2009	Co-written with Brett Conrad
2009	Sons of Anarchy	2	"Albification"	1	September 8, 2009	
2008	Sons of Anarchy	1	"The Revelator"	13	November 26, 2008	
2008	Sons of Anarchy	1	"The Sleep of Babies"	12	November 19, 2008	
2008	Sons of Anarchy	1	"Capybara"	11	November 12, 2008	Co-written with Dave Erickson
2008	Sons of Anarchy	1	"The Pull"	8	October 22, 2008	Co-written with Jack LoGiudice
2008	Sons of Anarchy	1	"Fun Town"	3	September 17, 2008	
2008	Sons of Anarchy	1	"Seeds"	2	September 10, 2008	
2008	Sons of Anarchy	1	"Pilot"	1	September 3, 2008	
2008	The Shield	7	"Parricide"	8	October 21, 2008	Co-written with Gary Lennon
2008	The Shield	7	"Coefficient of Drag"	1	September 2, 2008	
2007	The Shield	6	"Exiled"	7	May 15, 2007	Co-written with Scott Rosenbaum
2007	The Shield	6	"On The Jones"	1	April 3, 2007	
2006	The Shield	5	"Of Mice and Lem"	10	March 14, 2006	Co-written with Charles H. Eglee
2006	The Shield	5	"Trophy"	5	February 7, 2006	Co-written with Renee Palya and Tony Soltis
2006	The Shield	5	"Extraction"	1	January 10, 2006	
2005	The Shield	4	"Ain't That a Shame"	13	June 14, 2005	Story co-written with Shawn Ryan, teleplay by Ryan and Glen Mazzara
2005	The Shield	4	"Judas Priest"	12	June 7, 2005	Story co-written with Charles H. Eglee, teleplay co-written with Scott Rosenbaum
2005	The Shield	4	"Grave"	2	March 22, 2005	
2004	The Shield	3	"Fire in the Hole"	13	June 1, 2004	Co-written with Charles H. Eglee
2004	The Shield	3	"Slipknot"	9	May 4, 2004	
2004	The Shield	3	"Mum"	5	April 6, 2004	Co-written with Shawn Ryan
2004	The Shield	3	"Playing Tight"	1	March 9, 2004	Co-written with Shawn Ryan
2003	The Shield	2	"Scar Tissue"	8	February 25, 2003	
2003	The Shield	2	"Dead Soldiers"	2	January 14, 2003	
2002	The Shield	1	"Two Days of Blood"	12	May 28, 2002	Co-written with Scott Rosenbaum
2002	The Shield	1	"Dragonchasers"	10	May 14, 2002	Co-written with Scott Rosenbaum
2002	The Shield	1	"Blowback"	5	April 9, 2002	

==== Director ====
Year	Show	Season	Episode title	Episode	Original airdate	Notes
2014	Sons of Anarchy	7	"Papa's Goods"	13	December 9, 2014	Series finale
2013	Sons of Anarchy	6	A Mother's Work	13	December 10, 2013	Season finale
2012	Sons of Anarchy	5	"J'ai Obtenu Cette"	13	December 4, 2012	Season finale
2011	Sons of Anarchy	4	"To Be, Act 2"	14	December 6, 2011	Season finale Pt. 2
2011	Sons of Anarchy	4	"To Be, Act 1"	13	November 29, 2011	Season finale Pt. 1
2010	Sons of Anarchy	3	"NS"	13	November 30, 2010	Season finale
2009	Sons of Anarchy	2	"Na Triobloidi"	13	December 1, 2009	Season finale
2008	Sons of Anarchy	1	"The Revelator"	13	November 26, 2008	Season finale
2007	The Shield	6	"Wins and Losses"	0	February 15, 2007	Promotional short for season 6

== See also ==
- Outlaw Empires
