= Guy Ferland =

American film and television director

- Born: February 18, 1966 (age 60); Beverly, Massachusetts, United States
- Occupations: Film director, television director
- Years active: 1989–present

Guy Ferland (born February 18, 1966) is an American film and television director.

== Career ==
After Alfred Hitchcock's 1946 film Notorious inspired him to become a filmmaker, Ferland went on to study cinema production at the University of Southern California's School of Cinema and Television, graduating in 1988, and received an internship working as a researcher at Creative Artists Agency. He landed a job as film director Joel Schumacher's assistant three days after receiving his Bachelor of Arts degree and until 1994 he worked with Schumacher on Cousins, Flatliners, If Looks Could Kill, Dying Young, Falling Down and The Client, receiving an associate producer credit in the last. He then moved on to write and direct his first own film, The Babysitter, in 1995 and in 1997 directed Telling Lies in America, which was commended for Excellence in Filmmaking by the National Board of Review of Motion Pictures. After directing and producing Delivered, he began to direct for television, starting with Our Guys: Outrage at Glen Ridge, an American Broadcasting Company made-for-television movie. He also directed the award-winning television movies After the Storm and Bang, Bang, You're Dead in 2001 and 2002 respectively. After the Storm was named Best Feature Film at the 2000 New York International Independent Film and Video Festival and Ferland was individually commended on the realism he brought to the film with underwater photography, while he was awarded a Daytime Emmy Award in the category of Outstanding Directing in a Children's Special and a Directors Guild of America Award in the category of Outstanding Directorial Achievement in Children's Programs for Bang Bang You're Dead in 2003.

After directing the 2004 sequel to the 1987 Dirty Dancing, Dirty Dancing: Havana Nights, Ferland proceeded to work primarily with television series, and has picked up credits directing for the series Ed, Medical Investigation, House, M.D., Blind Justice, Nip/Tuck, The Unit, Prison Break, Sleeper Cell, Raines, Traveler, Damages, Saving Grace, The Riches, Eleventh Hour, The Blacklist, Daredevil, and most notably The Shield, for which he has directed thirteen episodes.

He was a regular director for the FX series Sons of Anarchy. Ferland has directed episodes of all seven seasons of the show. He also directed one episode of the FX series The Bridge in 2014.

He also directed six episodes of the zombie television series The Walking Dead.

Ferland has directed episodes for CBS' Elementary.

He also directed one episode for first season FX series The Strain, created by Guillermo del Toro.

Also an episode from the second and third season of Yellowstone.

In 2021, he directed two episodes of Coyote and episode #116, "Due Process,” from the eighth season of Chicago P.D.

He directed episodes five and six of the American western drama series 1923.

== Personal life ==
Ferland was born in Beverly, Massachusetts and attended the acclaimed Hollis/Brookline High School in Hollis, NH. His father is Rod Ferland, a high school band teacher who also plays with Massachusetts' Boston Pops Orchestra.
