= Opie Winston =

Fictional character from Sons of Anarchy

Harry "Opie" Winston
- Sons of Anarchy character
- Ryan Hurst as Opie Winston
- First appearance: "Pilot" (2008)
- Last appearance: "Stolen Huffy" (2012)
- Created by: Kurt Sutter
- Portrayed by: Ryan Hurst

In-universe information
- Nicknames: Opie; Ope
- Family: Piermont Winston (father); Mary Winston (mother); Piper (stepson)
- Spouses: Donna Winston; Lyla Winston
- Children: Ellie Winston; Kenny Winston
- Nationality: American

Harry "Opie" Winston is a fictional character on the FX television series Sons of Anarchy, played by Ryan Hurst. He is a member of the Sons of Anarchy Motorcycle Club, Redwood Original (SAMCRO) and the son of founder Piney and best friend of Jax since childhood.

== Character biography ==
Opie was born in Charming, California in 1978 to Piney and Mary Winston. Mary took him away when he was sixteen, but he quickly returned to Charming and became a member of SAMCRO in 1995. He marries his wife, Donna, and together they have two children, Ellie and Kenny.

=== Season 1 ===
In 2003, Opie is sent to prison for five years after being caught by police when his getaway driver, SAMCRO member Kyle Hobart, abandoned him at a crime scene, thus leaving Opie's family to fend for themselves during his incarceration. Upon his release in 2008, Opie works as a lumberjack but his family has difficulty making ends meet, which contributes to Opie's decision to resume illegal activity with SAMCRO, against Donna's wishes. ATF agent June Stahl attempts to recruit Opie as an informant which causes her to trick Clay Morrow, SAMCRO's president, into believing that Opie betrayed the club and the others with whom he murdered Heffner, a port commissioner. Clay responds by ordering Tig Trager to kill Opie and pin it on the One-Niners street gang. Opie's wife, Donna, who was driving his truck, is mistakenly killed instead.

=== Season 2 ===
After Donna is murdered, Opie spirals into depression and dives deep back into the SAMCRO lifestyle. He starts to become more distant from his children and bonds with Lyla, a porn star. They later form a relationship, and Opie wants her to leave the porn industry.

=== Season 3 ===
When SAMCRO exploits its porn connections to entertain Chinese triad crime boss Henry Lin and his clients, a furious Opie starts a fight with Lin's clients. This ultimately leads to the club losing out on a major deal. He travels to Belfast to aide Jax, who's searching for his kidnapped son Abel. After Agent Stahl tries to dismantle SAMCRO, Opie, with the help of corrupt Charming police chief Wayne Unser, targets Agent Stahl in retribution for her role in the death of his wife, Donna. Opie shoots Stahl in the back of the head, instantly killing her. Chibs Telford rigs the scene to look as if the IRA murdered Stahl and rogue IRA member Jimmy O'Phelan.

=== Season 4 ===
Members of SAMCRO are released from prison after serving 14 months for federal weapons charges, due to Stahl's actions. They return to their hometown of Charming, California where they are disturbed by the sight of signs for a new real estate development in their quiet town, spearheaded by the town's new mayor Jacob Hale, Jr. and Elliott Oswald, whose land was seized for the project under eminent domain. On their way into town, they encounter the town's new sheriff, Eli Roosevelt, who together with Assistant U.S. Attorney Lincoln Potter has convened a secret task force to shut down the club's gunrunning operation. Opie and fiancée Lyla get married in a ceremony on an Indian reservation. During the wedding, Jax and Clay kill Russian mob boss Viktor Putlova, while other members seize the Russian's guns and use them to wipe out the rest of the mob. Opie discovers birth control in Lyla's dressing room. Angry that she is sabotaging their attempts to conceive, he sleeps with Ima. Lyla arrives at the clubhouse to find Ima leaving Opie's room. Opie says that he did it because he found her birth control pills, and when she admits to having an abortion, he tells her that he is leaving her until she decides what she wants. Jax lures Ima into her dressing room and throws her against a table, warning her to stay away from his family and the clubhouse.

As the gang votes on the future of Clay's presidency, the clubhouse is attacked by the Lobos Sonora cartel, who drop off the severed heads of two SAMTAZ members, including club president Armando's. One cartel member is captured in the attack, but the Mayans are hit simultaneously, losing three men and a truck full of drugs. Piney demands that Clay withdraw the club from the drug business, threatening to deliver John Teller's letters to the club if he fails. Later that night, Clay arrives at Piney's house and kills him, scrawling the signature of the Lobos Sonora cartel on an old photo of the Sons of Anarchy's founding 'First 9.'

Tig, and Opie turn to Lyla for help locating Georgie Caruso to punish him for inadvertently helping Hale. As they stuff him in the trunk of a car, he admits to sending men after Luann, but only with the intention of roughing her up. Tig and Opie fill his car with bullets. Opie takes the tow truck up to Piney's cabin and finds his father dead. Unser follows him to the cabin and tells him that Clay is the man responsible. Opie's trust in Jax and the club is broken as he seeks revenge. He later arrives at the club and shoots Clay twice. In an attempt to stop Opie, Jax shoots him in the wrist, and takes him to his home, where he stays hidden.

=== Season 5 ===
Opie rebuffs Jax's offer to sit at the table due to Jax's decision in keeping Clay at the table. Clay visits Opie and convinces him that Jax needs him at the MC. Opie arrives at the clubhouse just as Jax, Tig Trager and Chibs Telford are being arrested for murder. Opie punches the sheriff to ensure he is kept close to Jax. Following a meeting with Damon Pope, Jax has to decide which member of the MC will die in prison. As he is about to sacrifice himself, Opie headbutts the prison guard and is taken to fight to the death. Despite initially putting up a good fight, Opie is outnumbered and eventually overpowered and beaten to death by a prison gang while Jax, Tig, and Chibs watch on through a window. Jax vows to get revenge against the prison guard for the death of his friend. Opie's wake is held at the clubhouse with every member of SAMCRO in attendance.

== Development and reception ==
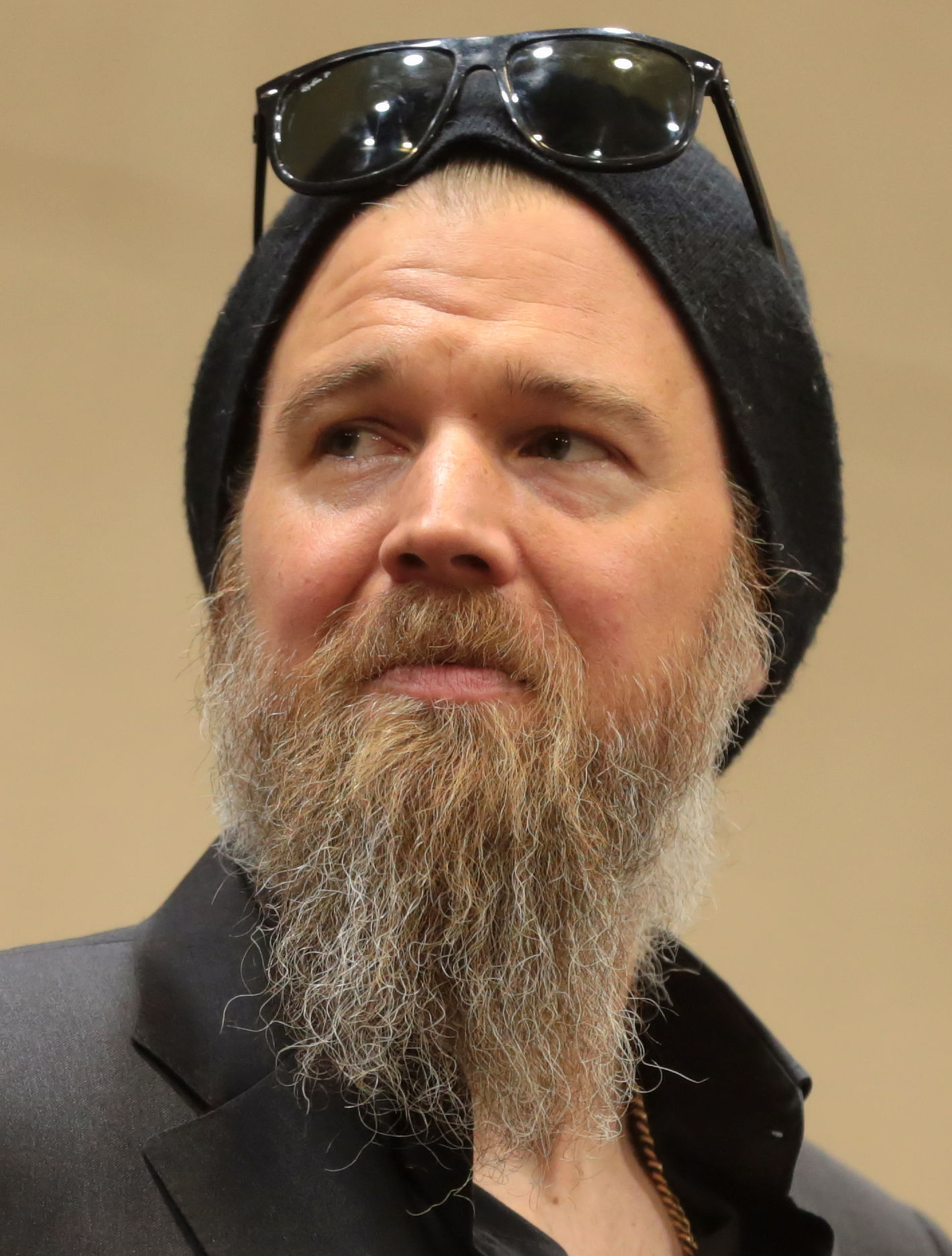
Ryan Hurst portrays Opie Winston

Ryan Hurst portrays Opie on Sons of Anarchy. Hurst was promoted to main star billing status starting in season two. Hurst's portrayal of Opie was met with positive reviews.

Opie is killed off in the fifth season episode "Laying Pipe". Hurst has since commented on his characters death, saying:

I couldn’t stop crying. I tried to talk him out of it, I went through Elisabeth Kubler-Ross’ stages of grief. He wasn’t sure of the particulars yet, just that it was gonna be bloody and gonna be noble… I didn’t see the way that it served the story. But then again, it’s not necessarily my position to comment on that. It’s Kurt’s show that he created, and whether it’s the right decision or the wrong decision, remains to be seen.

Series creator Kurt Sutter said:

I do believe that some of it was a sense of, ‘Here’s an opportunity for me to go out doing the right thing, to be of best service to my club’ — and also to his family, Jax wasn’t going to force himself to make that choice [of who dies]. Opie saw that... and had to step in and make that choice.

As the series is based on William Shakespeare's Hamlet, Digital Spy questioned if Opie was the character that was based on Ophelia, saying: "Our favourite Ophelia choice is probably Opie, if only because of the remarkable similarities between their names. Jax's childhood friend is certainly put through the ringer [sic], although his death falls into the 'noble sacrifice' category rather than Ophelia's famous suicide."
