= SO (Sons of Anarchy) =

- Sons of Anarchy episode
- Episode no.: Season 3 Episode 1
- Directed by: Stephen Kay
- Written by: Kurt Sutter
- Cinematography by: Paul Maibaum
- Editing by: Etienne Des Lauriers
- Production code: 3WAB01
- Original air date: September 7, 2010
- Running time: 60 minutes

Guest appearances
- Ally Walker as Agent June Stahl (special guest star); Paula Malcomson as Maureen Ashby (special guest star); Kenny Johnson as Herman Kozik (special guest star); Taylor Sheridan as Chief David Hale; Dayton Callie as Wayne Unser; Jamie McShane as Cameron Hayes; Tory Kittles as Laroy Wayne; Winter Ave Zoli as Lyla Dvorak; Jeff Kober as Jacob Hale, Jr.; Michael Marisi Ornstein as Chuck 'Chucky' Marstein; David Labrava as Happy Lowman; Dorian Missick as Pony Joe

Episode chronology
← Previous "Na Trioblóidí"	Next → "Oiled"

"SO" is the third season premiere of the FX television series Sons of Anarchy. It was written by Kurt Sutter, the original series creator and directed by Stephen Kay. It originally aired in the United States on September 7, 2010.

This episode marks the last appearance of Taylor Sheridan (Deputy Chief David Hale), and the first for Paula Malcomson (Maureen Ashby) and James Cosmo (Fr. Kellan Ashby).

== Plot ==
Jax is distraught in the wake of Abel's disappearance. Hale is moving into the office of the chief, a position that he states will soon be official. His brother, Jacob, apologizes for bringing Zobelle to Charming, and states that he never intended things to escalate as far as they did. Jacob also tells Hale that he is continuing with his campaign to be mayor of Charming, and asks for "the support of the chief." Hale agrees to support his brother. As the Sons go out to look for Cameron, he remains neutral. Jax attempts to break up with Tara because he believes he is ruining her life, but she remains loyal to him and refuses to leave. SAMCRO buries Half-Sack with over 50 full-patch members from California, Washington, Nevada, and Oregon as well as numerous former military colleagues in attendance. A three-piece kutte is draped over his casket during the service, implying that SAMCRO posthumously patched him in. At the wake, Clay tells Jax that he has to be strong to inspire his SAMCRO brothers. Hale keeps vigil over Half-Sack's funeral which is being attended by numerous Sons Of Anarchy members and associates. Jacob meets him there and reiterates his disgust for the gang and the apparent outpouring of support for them. Hale explains that people, including those in Charming, don't like to see SAMCRO vulnerable since it makes everyone uncomfortable. Later into the funeral, an unknown party, later revealed to be the Calaveras MC, commits a drive-by shooting, injuring and killing several attendees. Hale tries to stop them by getting in front of their van and firing at the driver, but is killed when the vehicle runs him over. Jacob and Unser both futilely rush towards his bloodied body as the van speeds off. When a woman's son is shot in the drive-by after the wake, Jax finally loses it and continually bashes the gunman's head into the pavement until his fellow Sons pull him away.

== Production ==
In an interview, series creator and executive producer, Kurt Sutter, explained that the decision to kill off Hale in the episode was motivated by Sheridan's desire to move on to another project.

== Reception ==
Some critics felt the third season was dragged down by the previous season's cliffhanger. James Poniewozik of TIME called the season three premiere "breathtaking" and praised Sagal’s performance with Holbrook. He later stated that Abel's disappearance helped return the show to its central problem: Jax's allegiance to the club.

IGN gave So an 8.5/10.0 rating, stating: "'So' was a very good episode with a few bad scenes... [and] has the potential to be a very good season for Sons."

Zach Handler of The AV Club gave So a perfect A rating.
