= The Kill Hole =

- Theatrical release poster
- Directed by: Mischa S. Webley
- Written by: Mischa S. Webley
- Produced by: Jonny Gillette; Zach Hagen
- Starring: Chadwick Boseman; Tory Kittles; Dennis Adkins; Victoria Blake; Ted Rooney; Peter Greene; Billy Zane
- Cinematography: Eric Billman
- Edited by: James Westby
- Music by: Jason Wells
- Production company: Alternate Ending Studios
- Distributed by: Alternate Ending Studios
- Release dates: August 28, 2012 (Columbia Gorge International Film Festival); March 15, 2013 (United States)
- Running time: 92 minutes
- Country: United States
- Language: English

The Kill Hole is a 2012 American action thriller war film written and directed by Mischa S. Webley and starring Chadwick Boseman, Tory Kittles, Dennis Adkins, Victoria Blake, Ted Rooney with Peter Greene and Billy Zane. It is Webley's directorial debut.

== Cast ==
- Chadwick Boseman as Lieutenant Samuel Drake
- Tory Kittles as Sergeant Devon Carter
- Dennis Adkins as Hull
- Victoria Blake as Carol
- Ted Rooney as James
- Peter Greene as Peter Krebbs
- Billy Zane as Marshall

== Reception ==
The film has a 25% rating on Rotten Tomatoes.

Dennis Harvey of Variety gave the film a negative review, calling it "a middling drama that tries to combine elements of Rambo with serious treatment of soldiers’ post-traumatic stress disorder and vague political commentary.”

Omer M. Mozaffar of RogerEbert.com gave the film a positive review and wrote, "Its director and producer Zach Hagen is congenial and it is a very good movie. It keeps leading you in one direction, in order to sneak up on you in the other."

Mark Olsen of the Los Angeles Times gave the film a negative review and wrote, "Made up of four or five story ideas all crammed together, the film maintains a stop-start momentum at best that keeps it from ever hitting a solid stride."

Neil Genzlinger of The New York Times gave the film a negative review, calling it, "an unconvincing, sometimes unfathomable tale about a brooding veteran (Chadwick Boseman) who was involved in a vaguely defined atrocity while fighting overseas."
