= Wander Darkly =

2020 American drama feature film

- Theratrical release poster
- Directed by: Tara Miele
- Written by: Tara Miele
- Produced by: Lynette Howell Taylor; Samantha Housman; Monica Levinson; Shivani Rawat
- Starring: Sienna Miller; Diego Luna; Beth Grant; Aimee Carrero; Tory Kittles; Vanessa Bayer
- Cinematography: Caroline Costa
- Edited by: Tamara Meem; Alex O'Flinn
- Music by: Alex Weston
- Production companies: 51 Entertainment; ShivHans Pictures
- Distributed by: Lionsgate
- Release dates: January 25, 2020 (Sundance); December 11, 2020 (United States)
- Running time: 97 minutes
- Country: United States
- Language: English

Wander Darkly is a 2020 American drama film written and directed by Tara Miele. The film stars Sienna Miller, Diego Luna, Beth Grant, Aimee Carrero, Tory Kittles, and Vanessa Bayer.

Wander Darkly had its world premiere at the Sundance Film Festival on January 25, 2020, and was released in the United States on December 11, 2020, by Lionsgate, to positive reviews from critics.

== Plot ==
Adrienne and Matteo are a couple with a child and home together, experiencing strife within themselves. While driving away from a party, their arguing causes an accident that leaves them hospitalized. They each experience memories of their past involving trauma while in a surreal state. In this state, Adrienne is convinced that she died during the accident and is saddened by the life and relationship she lost, but Matteo tells her she is not dead. She refuses to believe him, despairing over the end of her life, arguing over what-ifs and what happened and what could have been, while Matteo doggedly keeps her focused on loving him and living for him and their baby, Ellie. As they walk through the many memories that lead to the accident, Matteo explains his faults and feelings for her.

Floundering over the painful truths of their limited time and lost opportunities, she attempts to jump over the building, unsure whether she is really dead or alive. Matteo stops her, convincing her she is not dead and that they still have time together. She trusts him again and takes his hand. He asks her to marry him. They get married, and they have a beautiful wedding.

Adrienne wakes up and is playing with her baby. Her parents are fussing over her, and her friend Maggie arrives to help with Ellie while she goes to her doctor's appointment. Her mother appears to want to talk about her state of mind, but Adrienne assures her she is fine. She passes the scene of their accident, and memories begin to flood her consciousness. She remembers the accident. Matteo died, not her. The truth is too painful for her to process and she goes through the grief all over again.

As time passes, she eventually gets better and moves on and raises Ellie. She realizes Matteo helped her to want to live for their child and wanted the opportunity to let her know how much he loved her. At the end, Adrienne takes Ellie for a boat ride in the sunrise at the ocean, and she sprinkles Matteo's ashes in the ocean and says goodbye.

== Cast ==
- Sienna Miller as Adrienne
- Diego Luna as Matteo
- Beth Grant as Patty
- Vanessa Bayer as Maggie
- Brett Rice as Steve
- Aimee Carrero as Shea
- Tory Kittles as Liam
- James Landry Hébert as The Hooded Figure
- Dan Gill as Dane
- Ethan Cohn as Kevin
- Lamont Thompson as Gary
- Olivia Popp as Ellie (4 years)
- Inde Navarrette as Ellie (15 years)

== Production ==
In August 2018, it was announced Sienna Miller and Diego Luna had joined the cast of the film, with Tara Miele directing from a screenplay she wrote.

Principal photography began Los Angeles in August 2018.

== Release ==
It had its world premiere at the Sundance Film Festival on January 25, 2020. In September 2020, Lionsgate acquired distribution rights to the film. It also screened at AFI Fest on October 19, 2020. It was scheduled to be released on December 11, 2020.

== Reception ==
Review aggregator Rotten Tomatoes gives the film an approval rating of 75% based on 97 reviews, with an average rating of 6.4/10. The website's critics consensus reads: "Wander Darkly's risks don't always yield rewards, but strong work from Diego Luna and Sienna Miller helps this romance remain consistently alluring." Metacritic reports a score of 66 out of 100 based on 12 reviews, indicating "mixed or average reviews".
