= Sons of Anarchy season 3 =

Third season of the American television drama series

Sons of Anarchy
- Season 3
- DVD cover
- Starring: Charlie Hunnam; Katey Sagal; Mark Boone Junior; Dayton Callie; Kim Coates; Tommy Flanagan; Ryan Hurst; William Lucking; Theo Rossi; Maggie Siff; Ron Perlman
- No. of episodes: 13

Release
- Original network: FX
- Original release: September 7 – November 30, 2010

Season chronology
- ← Previous; Season 2 Next → Season 4

The third season of the American television drama series Sons of Anarchy premiered on September 7, 2010, and concluded on November 30, 2010, after 13 episodes aired on cable network FX. Created by Kurt Sutter, it is about the lives of a close-knit outlaw motorcycle club operating in Charming, a fictional town in California's Central Valley. The show centers on protagonist Jackson "Jax" Teller (Charlie Hunnam), the then–vice president of the club, who begins questioning the club and himself in the aftermath of his infant son's abduction.

Season three attracted an average of 4.9 million viewers per week, making it FX's highest rated series ever at the time, surpassing FX's other hits The Shield, Nip/Tuck, and Rescue Me.

Sons of Anarchy is the story of the Teller-Morrow family of Charming, California, as well as other members of the Sons of Anarchy Motorcycle Club, Redwood Original (SAMCRO), their families, various Charming townspeople, allied and rival gangs, associates, and law agencies that undermine or support SAMCRO's legal and illegal enterprises.

In 2018, Universo announced the season 3 premiere of Sons of Anarchy in Spanish on 29 October 2018.

== Plot ==
Gemma has been hiding in Rogue River, Oregon with Tig at the home of Gemma's father, Nate (Hal Holbrook), who has dementia. Gemma struggles when she takes Nate to his new assisted living home, and he pleads to be taken back to his house. She returns to Charming to reunite with her grandson, unaware he has been kidnapped. The return of A.T.F. agent Stahl twists the facts about the murder of Donna, Stahl attempts to make a deal with Jax behind the club's back. Father Kellan Ashby's sister, Maureen, contacts Gemma at Ashby's request and tells her Abel is safe in Belfast. Upon learning of her grandson's abduction, Gemma suffers a cardiac arrhythmia and collapses in the Teller-Morrow lot. After the club returns from Northern Ireland and brings home Abel, agent Stahl double crosses Jax and tells the club about the side deal Jax made with her, unaware that Jax and the club had it planned all along knowing Stahl would back out of the deal. Jax, Clay, Bobby, Tig, Juice and Happy are hauled away to jail. While Opie, Chibs, Piney, and the Prospects are all en route following Stahl. Chibs finally gets revenge on Jimmy by killing him and Opie kills Stahl as revenge for the death of his wife, Donna.

== Cast and characters ==
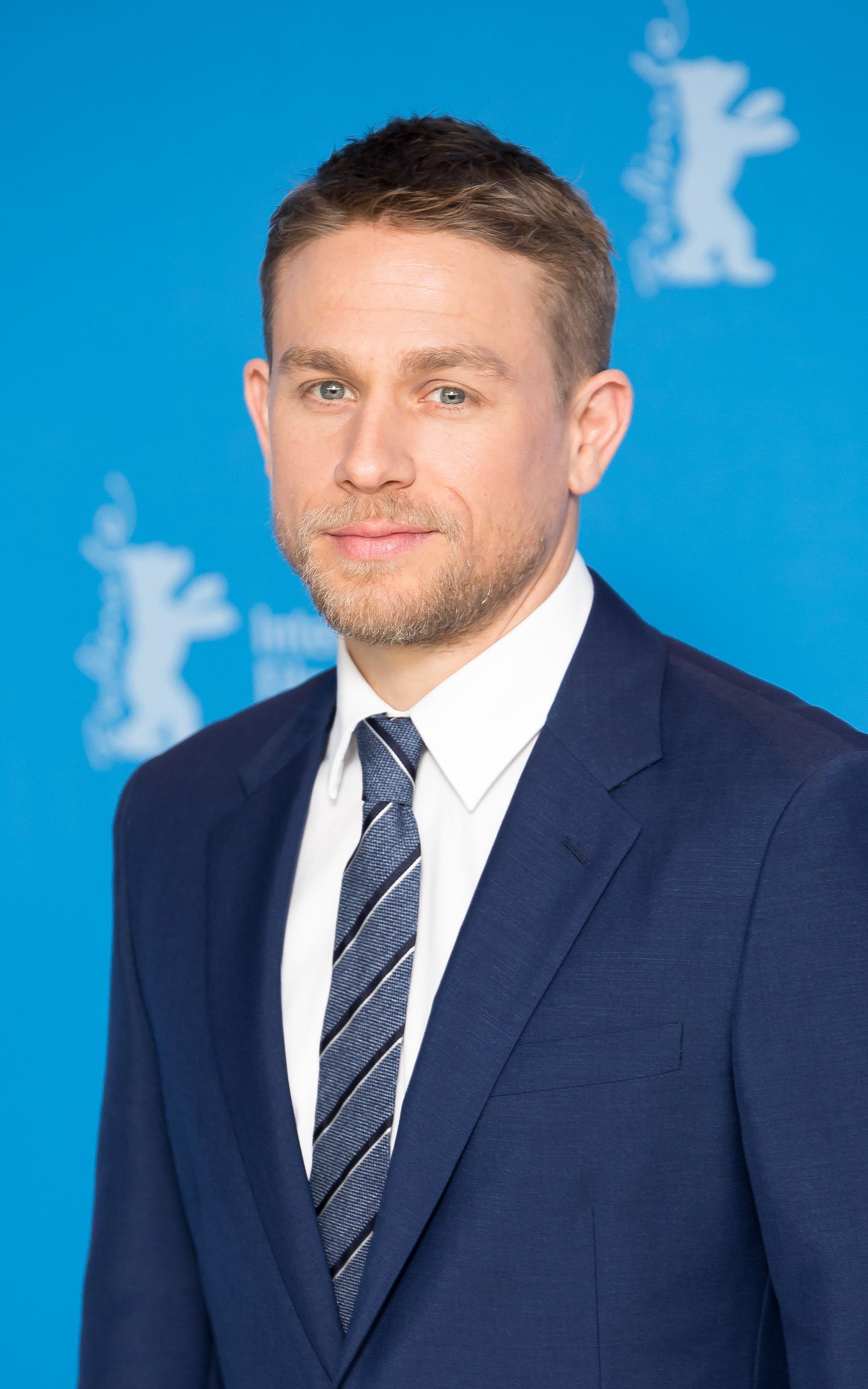
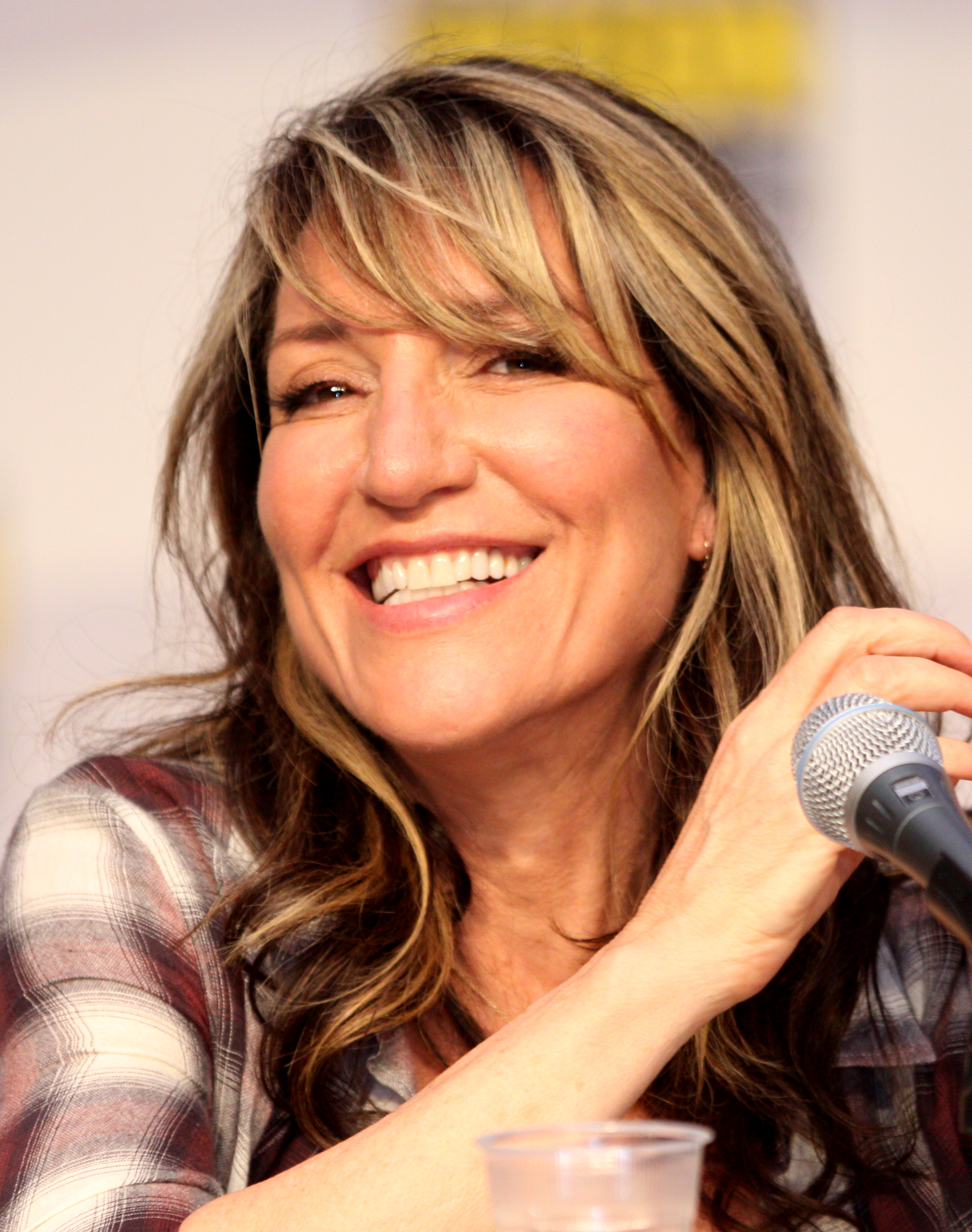
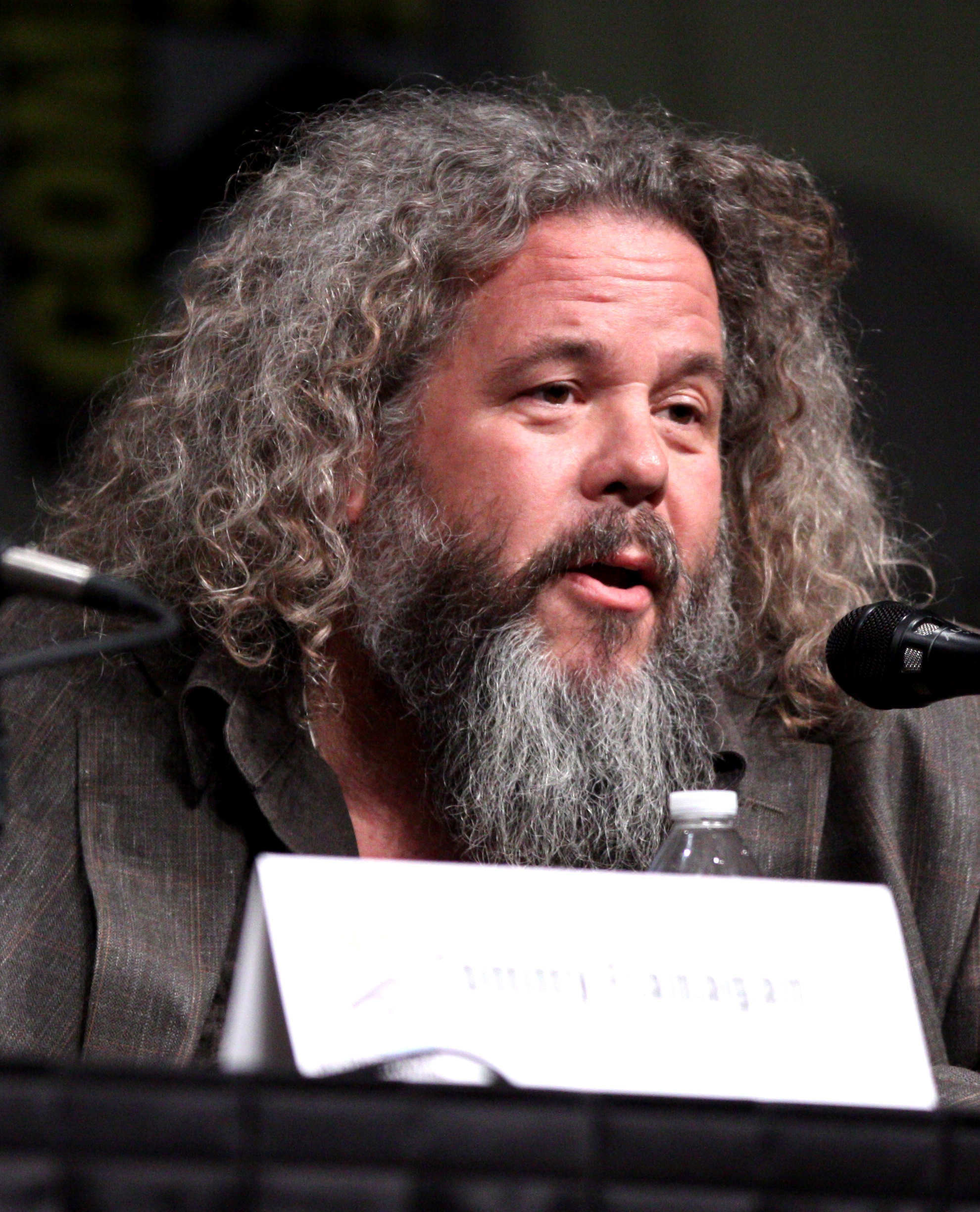
Charlie Hunnam (Jax Teller), Katey Sagal (Gemma Teller Morrow), and Mark Boone Junior (Bobby Munson)
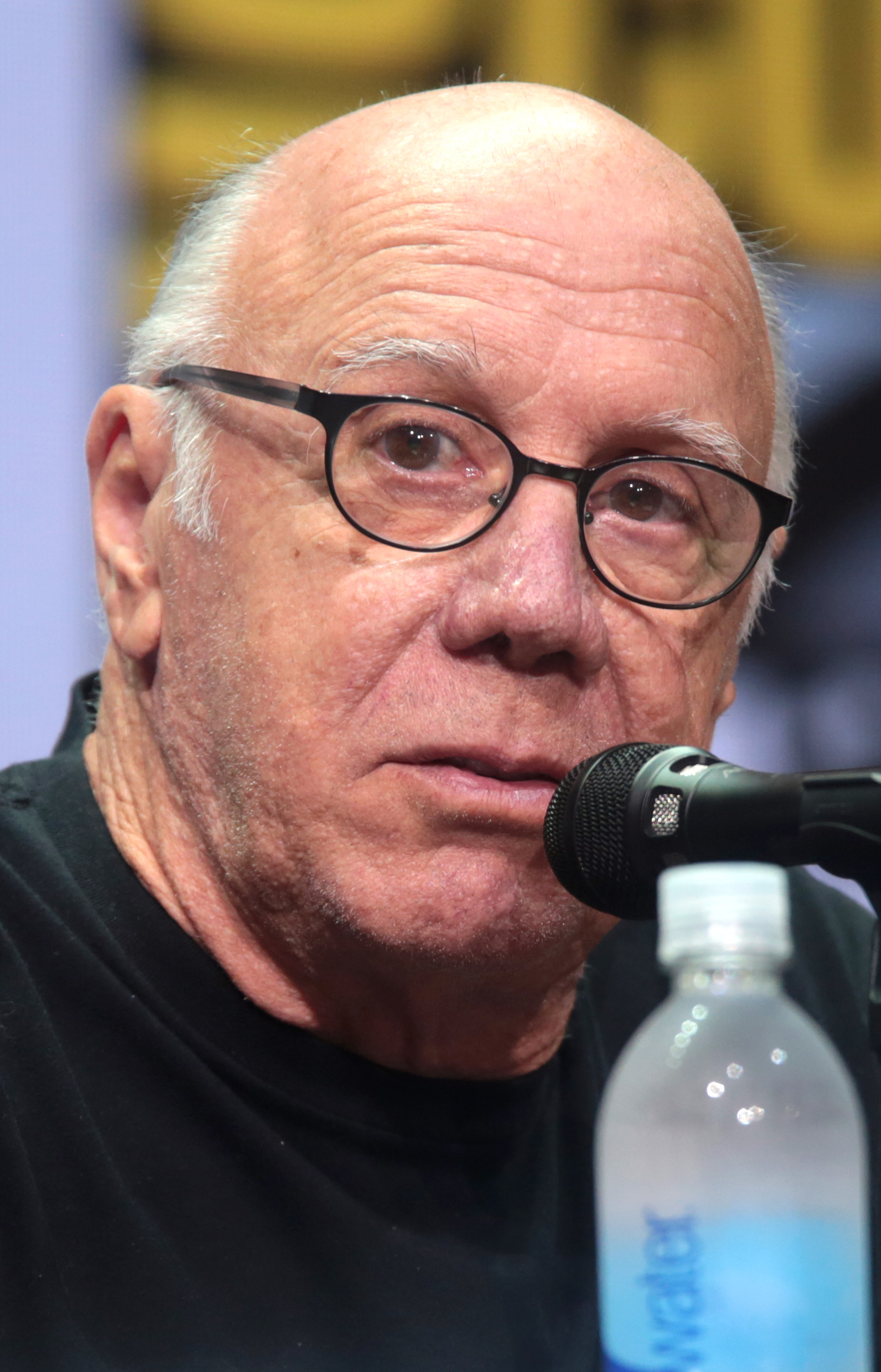
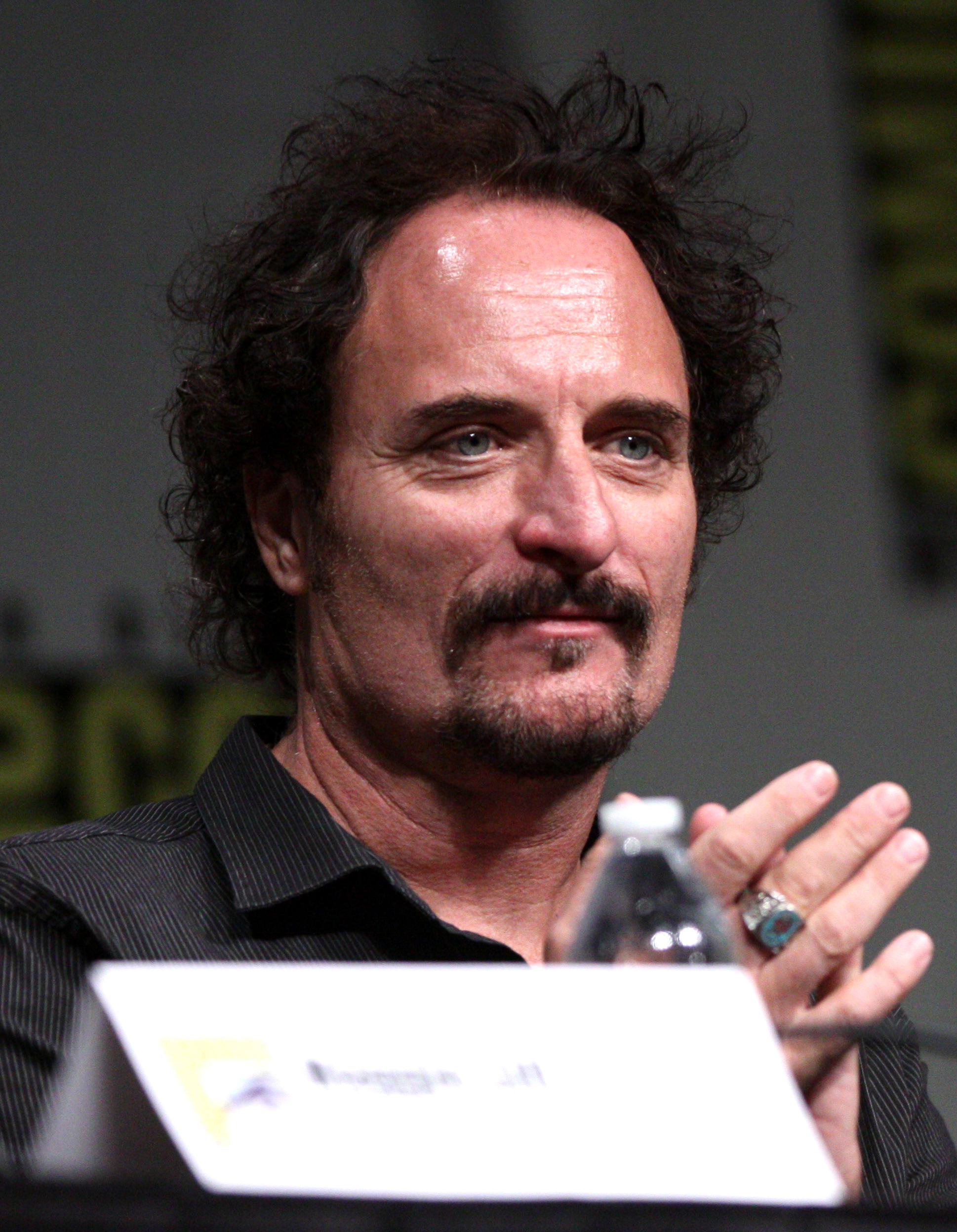
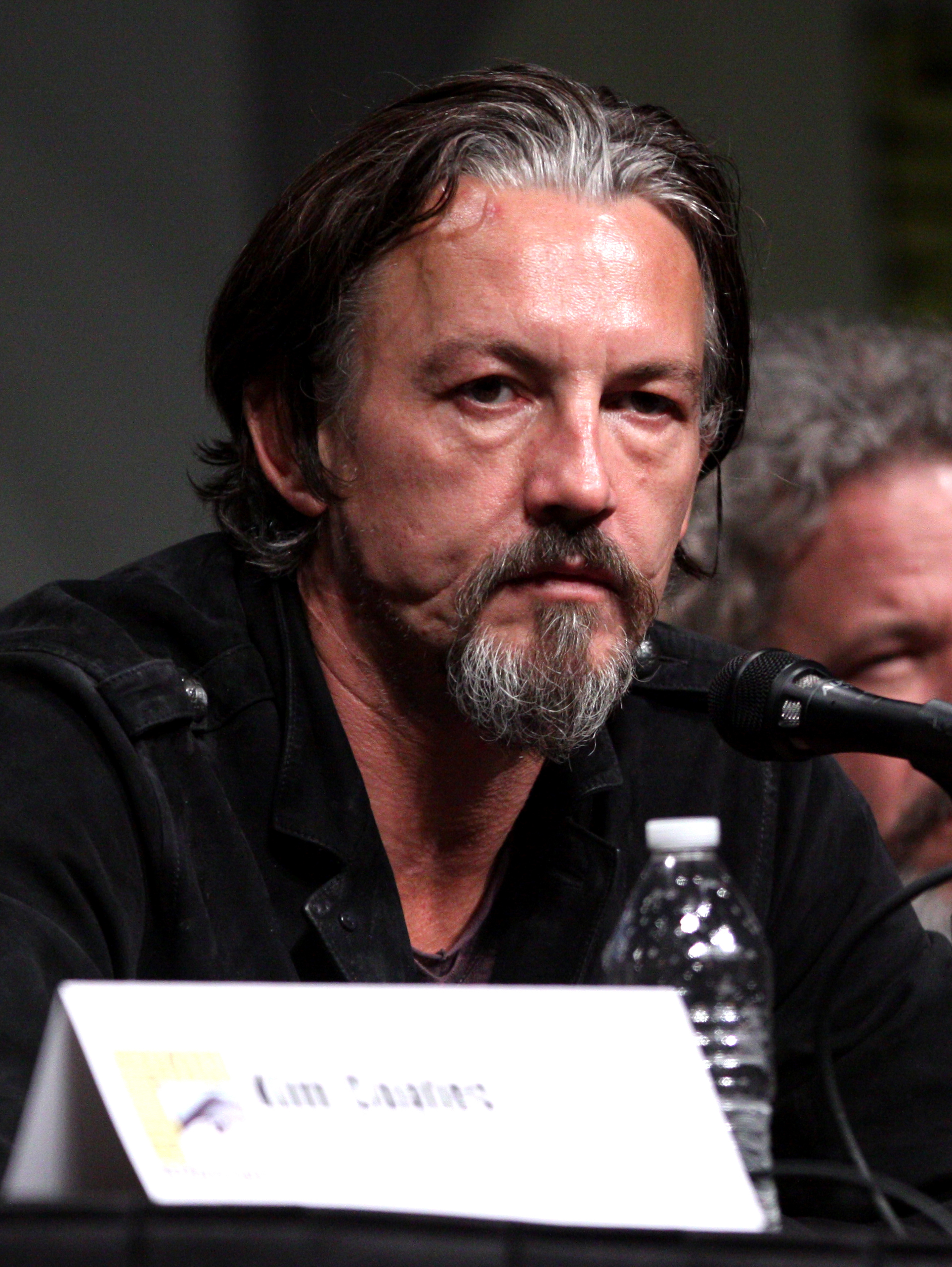
Dayton Callie (Wayne Unser), Kim Coates (Tig Trager) and Tommy Flanagan (Chibs Telford)
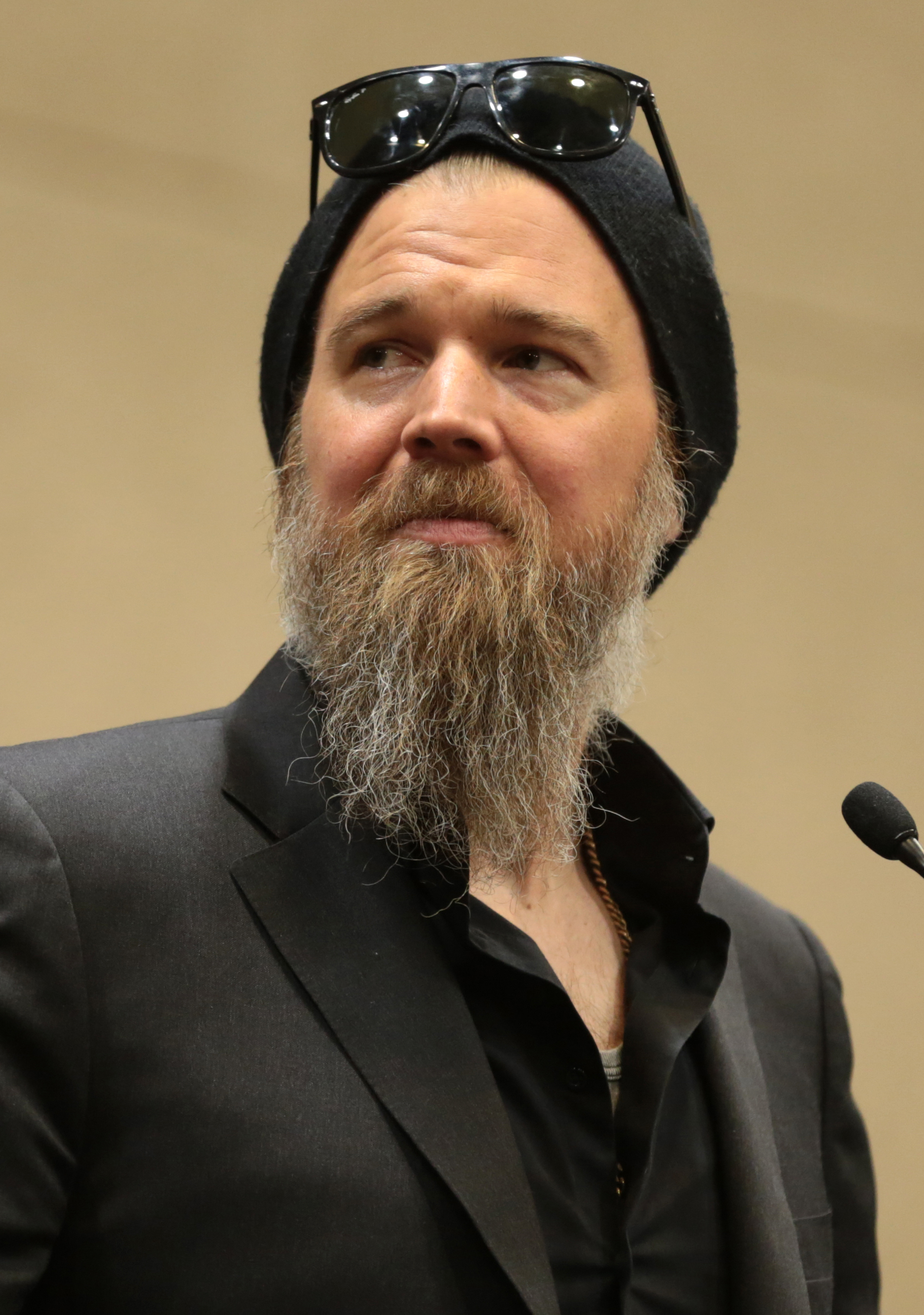
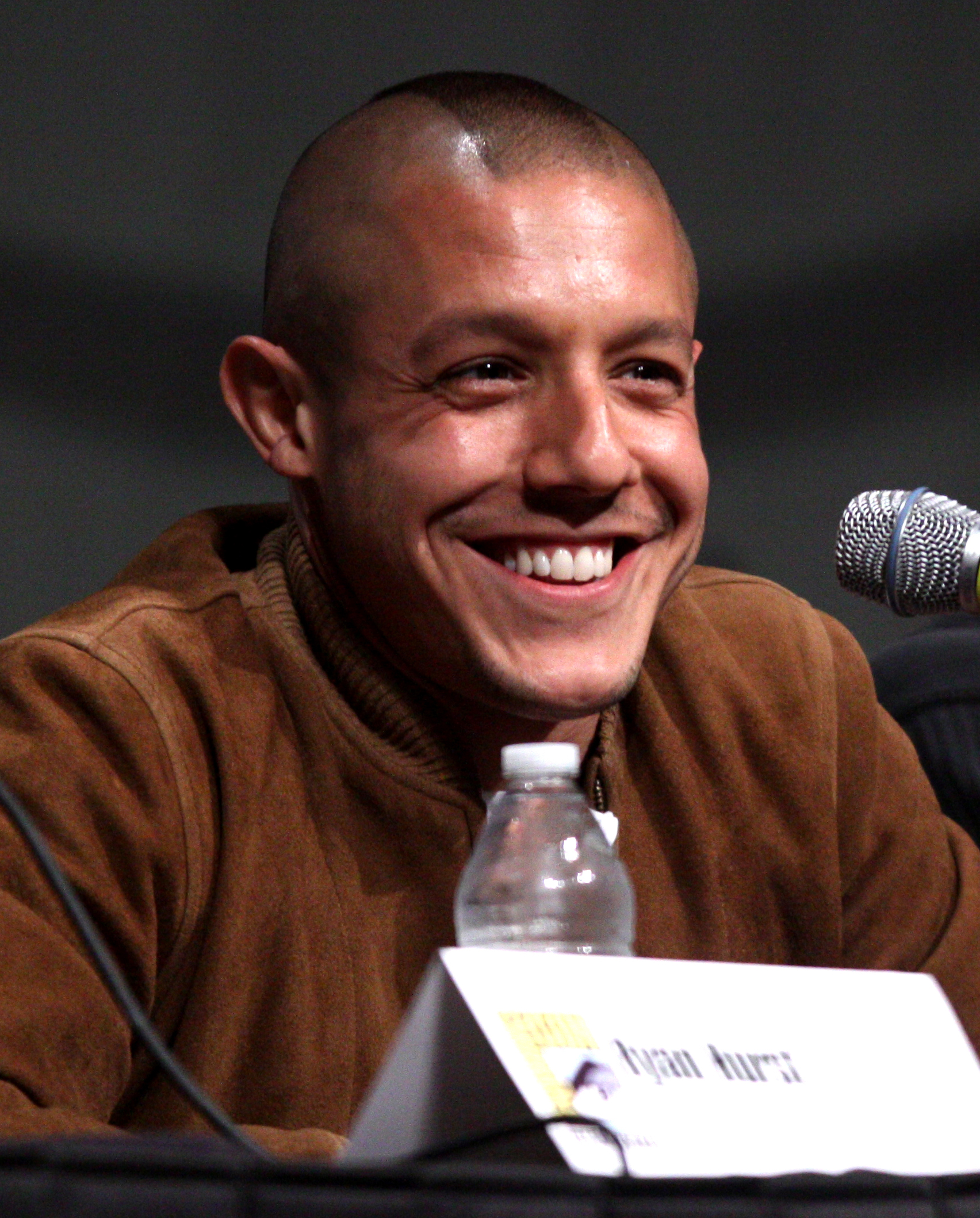
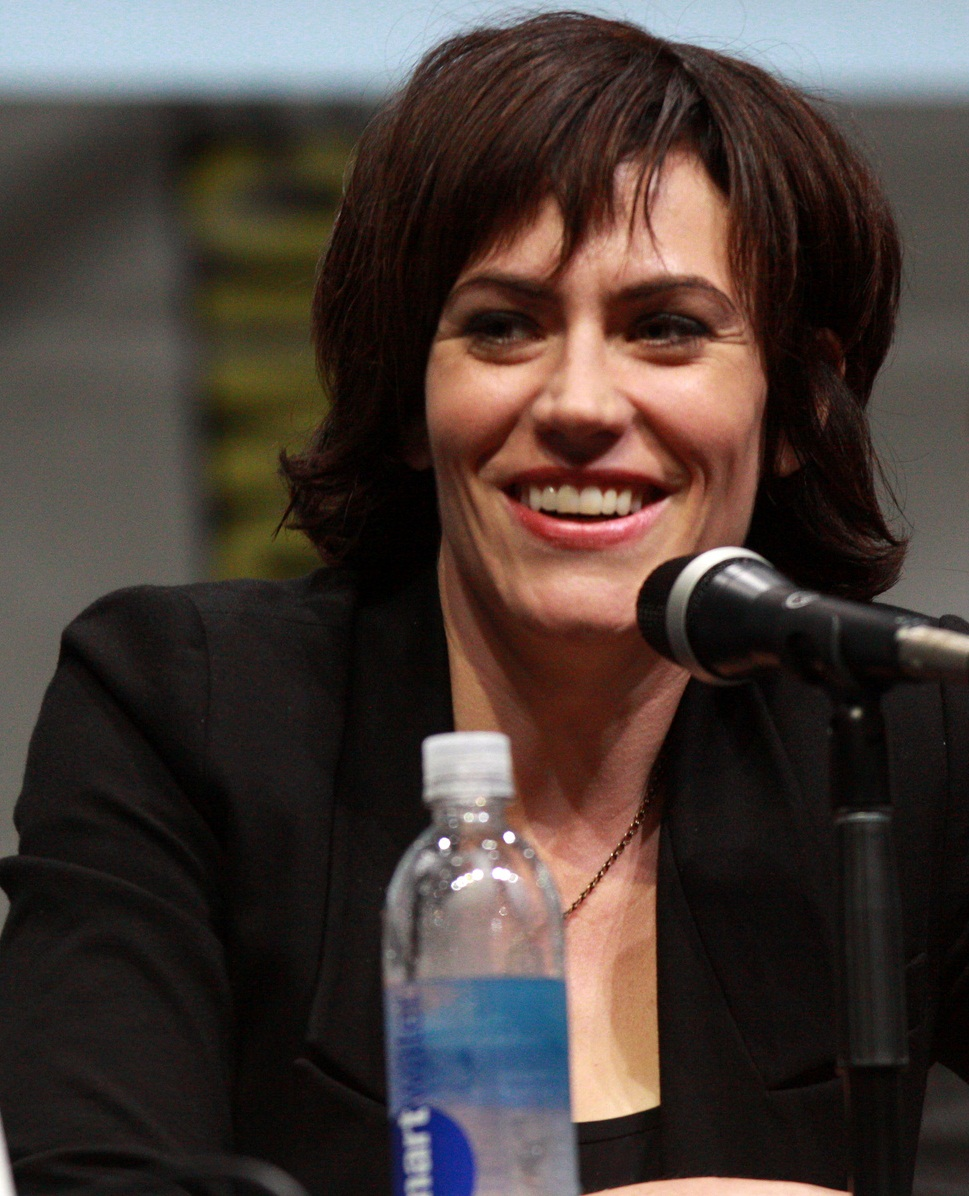
Ryan Hurst (Opie Winston), Theo Rossi (Juice Ortiz), and Maggie Siff (Tara Knowles)
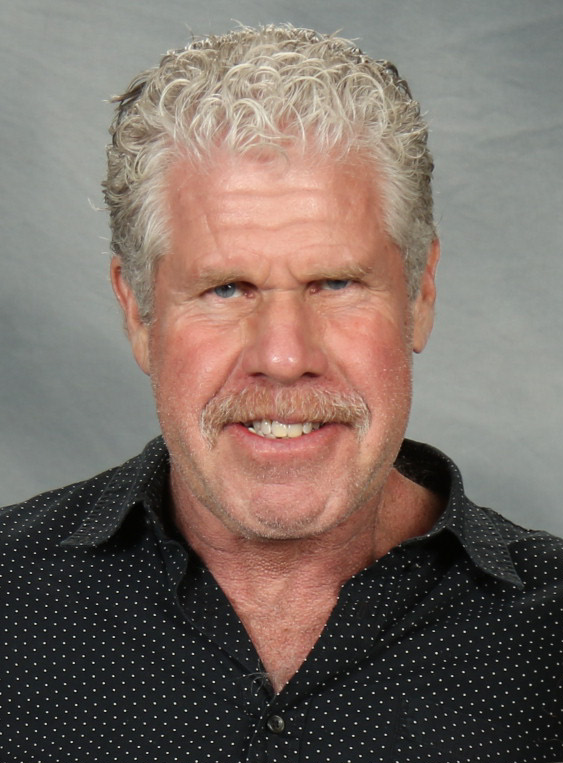
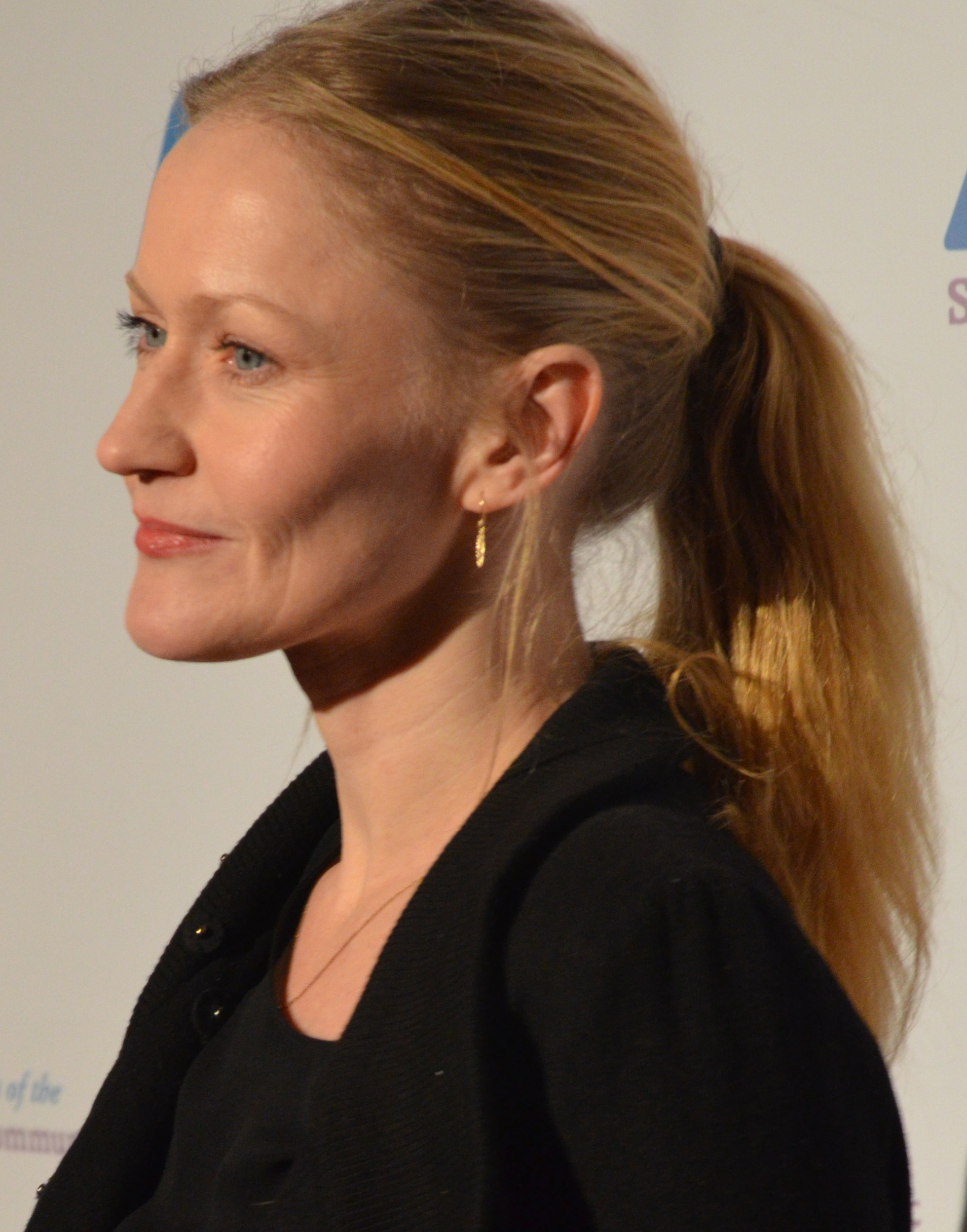
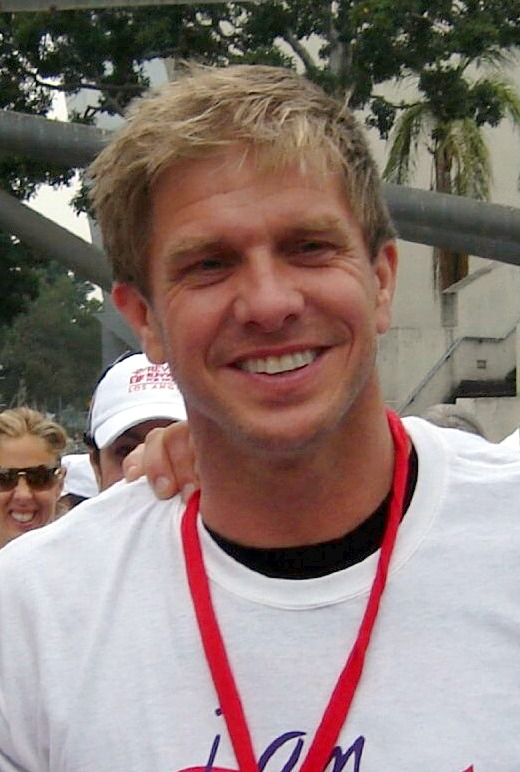
Ron Perlman (Clay Morrow), Paula Malcomson (Maureen Ashby), and Kenny Johnson (Herman Kozik)

=== Main cast ===
- Charlie Hunnam as Jackson "Jax" Teller
- Katey Sagal as Gemma Teller Morrow
- Ron Perlman as Clarence "Clay" Morrow
- Mark Boone Junior as Robert "Bobby Elvis" Munson
- Dayton Callie as Wayne Unser
- Kim Coates as Alex "Tig" Trager
- Tommy Flanagan as Filip "Chibs" Telford
- Ryan Hurst as Harry "Opie" Winston
- William Lucking as Piermont "Piney" Winston
- Theo Rossi as Juan-Carlos "Juice" Ortiz
- Maggie Siff as Dr. Tara Knowles

=== Special guest cast ===
- Paula Malcomson as Maureen Ashby
- Ally Walker as Agent June Stahl
- Kenny Johnson as Herman Kozik
- Mitch Pileggi as Ernest Darby
- Stephen King as Bachman
- Sonny Barger as Lenny "The Pimp" Janowitz

=== Recurring cast ===
- David LaBrava as Happy Lowman
- McNally Sagal as Margaret Murphy
- Jose Pablo Cantillo as Hector Salazar
- Michael Marisi Ornstein as Chuck Marstein
- Titus Welliver as Jimmy O'Phelan
- James Cosmo as Father Kellan Ashby
- Jeff Kober as Jacob Hale Jr.
- Zoe Boyle as Trinity Ashby
- Winter Ave Zoli as Lyla Winston
- Andrew McPhee as Keith McGee
- Arie Verveen as Liam O'Neill
- Pamela J. Gray as Agent Amy Tyler
- Marcello Thedford as Lander Jackson
- Michael Beach as T.O. Cross
- Joel Tobeck as Donny
- Hal Holbrook as Nate Madock
- Patrick St. Esprit as Elliott Oswald
- Darin Heames as Seamus Ryan
- Q'orianka Kilcher as Kerrianne Larkin-Telford
- Bellina Logan as Fiona Larkin
- Emilio Rivera as Marcus Alvarez
- Jamie McShane as Cameron Hayes
- Monique Gabriela Curnen as Amelia Dominguez
- Kristen Renton as Ima Tite
- Taryn Manning as Cherry/Rita
- Michael Fairman as Lumpy Feldstein
- Robin Weigert as Ally Lowen
- Marcos de la Cruz as Agent Estevez
- Taylor Sheridan as Deputy Chief David Hale
- Tory Kittles as Laroy Wayne
- Kenneth Choi as Henry Lin
- Kurt Sutter as "Big" Otto Delaney
- Keith Szarabajka as Victor Putlova
- Drea De Matteo as Wendy Case

=== Guest stars ===
- Leo Fitzpatrick as Prospect Shephard
- Bob McCracken as Brendan Roarke
- Dorian Missick as Pony Joe
- Olivia Burnette as Homeless Woman
- Stephen King as Bachman
- Marilyn Manson as Tully

== Production ==
Although Sons of Anarchy is set in Northern California's Central Valley, it is filmed primarily at Occidental Studios Stage 5A in North Hollywood. Main sets located there include the clubhouse, St. Thomas Hospital and Jax's house. The production rooms at the studio used by the writing staff also double as the Charming police station. External scenes are often filmed nearby in Sun Valley and Tujunga. Interior and exterior scenes set in Northern Ireland during season 3 were also filmed at Occidental Studios and surrounding areas. A second unit shot footage in Northern Ireland used in the third season.

== Reception ==
Some critics felt the third season was dragged down by the previous season's cliffhanger. On review aggregator website Rotten Tomatoes, the season has an approval rating of 90% based on 20 reviews. The site's critical consensus reads: "Sons of Anarchy returns with risk-taking writing, thrusting its characters into fascinating and unexpected turmoil." James Poniewozik of TIME called the season three premiere "breathtaking" and praised Sagal's performance with Holbrook. He later stated that Abel's disappearance helped return the show to its central problem: Jax's allegiance to the club. Entertainment Weekly’s Ken Tucker agreed that Holbrook and Sagal’s scenes were "beautiful". He also commented that the series handled themes of loyalty and family especially well. Maureen Ryan commented that the third season divided critics and fans alike, suggesting the expanded Belfast cast made it harder for the audience to invest in the characters' journeys. Ryan later questioned the credibility of Hector Salazar's story, noting that he was inferior to other villainous characters such as Stahl, Zobelle and Weston. However, she praised Ally Walker's performance, comparing her character to The Shield's Vic Mackey. Critic Alan Sepinwall said the season was "interesting but uneven", noting that the plot gained traction in later episodes. Tim Goodman of The Hollywood Reporter said "Sutter should be applauded for shaking things up", calling the slower pace a "creative necessity".

== Episodes ==
No. overall	No. in season	Title	Directed by	Written by	Original release date	Prod. code	U.S. viewers (millions)
27	1	"SO"	Stephen Kay	Kurt Sutter	September 7, 2010	3WAB01	4.13
The aftermath of Abel's kidnapping and Half-Sack's death has SAMCRO reeling, especially Jax. Gemma, who is still on the lam, gets hit with some unexpected news from her past and visits her dementia ridden father with Tig. Jax tries to push Tara away, she gets so upset she trashes Abel's nursery. She then requests to assist in an operation and freezes up. Stahl is back in town and speaks with Clay. The club posthumously patches Half-Sack into the club, before an unknown gang of shooters disturb the peace at the funeral, shooting and killing a child in the crossfire. While driving the van, one of the unknowns rams Hale down, driving over his head on the way out. One guy tumbles out of the van and is smashed on the concrete by a furious Jax, who is stopped by SAMCRO.
28	2	"Oiled"	Gwyneth Horder-Payton	Kurt Sutter & Dave Erickson	September 14, 2010	3WAB02	3.37
Chucky is in hospital after the attack. SAMCRO find the shooter in the hospital and discover they are not Mayans but Calaveras / Lodi. SAMCRO wonder if it was an initiation attack. Tara asks for a leave of absence from her job and Jax and Clay find out the Calaveras are patching over Mayans. In Ireland, Cameron seeks council with the IRA. Cameron leaves Abel with a relation and gets strangled to death. Gemma deals with her family issues, along with a suspicious caregiver. Tig gets shot by the father after he finds the caregiver and Tig having sex. Gemma has a 25k bounty on her head and is threatened by the caregiver for the money. Gemma asks Tara to come patch up Tig. To get intel on Abel's whereabouts, Jax and the club help a bounty hunter track down a skip.
29	3	"Caregiver"	Billy Gierhart	Chris Collins & Regina Corrado	September 21, 2010	3WAB03	3.48
The club exploits its porn connections to entertain Henry Lin's clients, which does not sit well with Opie. Opie loses his temper with jealousy ends up punching one of Henry's clients who was with Lyla. Henry then threatens Clay with no guns and no money. Tara, Gemma, and Tig turn to an unlikely source when the situation with the caregiver goes sideways. Gemma's 25k bounty on her head leads her to be threatened by the caregiver for the money, which flips her and she leaves the woman blindfolded and restrained roughly in a wheelchair in the basement. The caregiver gets loose because of Tara and confronts Gemma, who accidentally kills her with the knife to the chest. Gemma also loses her father when he takes off in a car with his hunting rifle. Jax and the Sons receive disturbing information about Cameron Hayes. Stephen King guest stars as Bachman, a "cleaner".
30	4	"Home"	Guy Ferland	Kurt Sutter & Liz Sagal	September 28, 2010	3WAB04	2.98
Jax and Clay head down to Nate's home to pick up Gemma. The rest of SAMCRO goes north to help Happy with a pharmaceutical favor in redneck territory, but get pinned down by locals after the drugs. Clay and SAMCRO come to the rescue. Tara's honesty with Jax comes at an inopportune time, when she reveals they killed the caretaker. She demands to go with Gemma to drop off her father. As Gemma puts old family matters to rest, new issues reveal themselves to her. She reaches out to Agent Stahl and makes a deal to turn herself in. Maureen reaches out to Gemma, who collapses after learning Abel was taken, and that Maureen gave the baby to Jimmy after looking after him. Jimmy is still lying to Jax on the phone, feeding him the false information. We briefly see Abel in a room with other babies, with a photographer taking photos.
31	5	"Turning and Turning"	Gwyneth Horder-Payton	Dave Erickson & Marco Ramirez	October 5, 2010	3WAB05	3.12
Jax meets with Luke and says Cameron was spotted with Abel in Belfast. He demands more info, getting highly suspicious. To help his mother, club, and son, Jax conspires with an unlikely source, Agent Stahl, and offers her information on all the activity of the Irish if she helps reduce the charges against SAMCRO, removes Gemma's warrant for arrest for the murder, and allows him to go get his son undercover. In order to get more information on the Mayan's drug trade, SAMCRO puts Chucky and Tig undercover, and Tig manages to get a shot of their schedule before being interrupted. Gemma confronts Tara about the secret she's been hiding. Juice gets jumped by Salazar and his crew in the Chicken Mans van. They beat him up and take his cut.
32	6	"The Push"	Stephen Kay	Chris Collins & Julie Bush	October 12, 2010	3WAB06	2.85
In order to raise money to get the Sons to Belfast, Jax is forced to involve Tara in their latest dealing. Happy is voted in but Kozik is voted nay by Tig, who states he still doesn't trust him. Kozik and Tig have a fight in the club. The others hijack a van filled with heroin filled balloons. Gemma gives her statement and reports Agent Tyler came out of the backroom after she found Edmond dead. Clay meets with Alvarez and show him the heroin they stole. Jax warns Tara of the risk of getting caught with the scrips. Darby sees Jax and Tara selling the scrips and tells Jacob Hale. Clay asks Elliott to get them to Belfast in one of his jets. Marcus and Elliott meet. Jax has sex with Ima as Tara lies in bed alone.To gain the friendship of the Mayans, SAMCRO must handle a rat at St. Thomas. Kozik's vote to get patched in hits a roadblock.
33	7	"Widening Gyre"	Billy Gierhart	Kurt Sutter & Regina Corrado	October 19, 2010	3WAB07	2.59
Tara finds Jax in bed with Ima. Chibs contacts Fiona, who does't know why Jimmy lied about Abel, but says Jimmy plans to push against Father Ashby. The Grim Bastards have a problem that could jeopardize SAMCRO's new business arrangements. They find one of their men killed with a knife in his back and blame it on backlash because they swore into SAMCRO. Salazar talks to Alvarez about it. As the Sons prepare for their departure to Belfast, Gemma learns of a dark secret from John Teller's past. Gemma rings Maureen to say SAMCRO are coming and Maureen tells her that Trinity is John's daughter. Tara gets support from an unlikely source after her breakup with Jax, while Lyla and Opie hit a snag in their relationship. Tara breaks Gemma out of the hospital so she can meet up and go with Clay and Jax.
34	8	"Lochán Mór"	Guy Ferland	Dave Erickson & Liz Sagal & Kurt Sutter	October 26, 2010	3WAB08	2.67
When SAMCRO pays a visit to another charter, not everyone is happy to see the mother charter. Police intercept the Sons leaving and attempt to detain them. They find the police were paid off but not given a name. SAMCRO suspect Jimmy, but they get to the SAMBEL base without further problems. Jacob Hale meets Darby and pays him to pressure Lumpy, a Jewish gym owner, to give up his gym on the main street so Hale can use the land. Fiona and Chibs get shot at on their way to the priests, SAMBEL blames the UVF, saying it was sending a message to Jimmy through Fiona. Jacob pays Hector to go after Lumpy after Darby returns the money. Margaret gets approached by Tara for an abortion clinic recommendation, after Lyla finds she is pregnant and isn't ready to keep it. Tara then makes an appointment for herself. Tig leaves the prospect Shepard with Lumpy for protection against Salazar, however Shepard abandons Lumpy when Salazar breaks in and assaults the old man, who is knocked unconscious. Father Kellan confides in Jax they plan to eliminate Jimmy. He asks Jax to kill him for his son in return. The episode ends on a scene of an unknown couple holding Abel. Note: Lochán Mór means Big Lake in Irish.
35	9	"Turas"	Stephen Kay	Story by : Kurt Sutter; Teleplay by : Chris Collins & Brady Dahl	November 2, 2010	3WAB09	3.35
The club embarks on a protection run, the likes of which they have never seen before. SAMCRO plan to trade a live Jimmy for Abel. Jax asks Stahl to look into Father Kellan. Tig, Piney and Kozik find Darby in the hospital visiting Lumpy and interrogate him. SAMCRO ask to go along on the gun run, unaware Jimmy and Keith plan to stop them getting through. Jimmy turns up at Maureen's, shoots her guard and demands Fiona go with him. Trinity gets the drop on Jimmy but Fiona stops her from killing him, claiming she is protecting Gemma's family from Jimmy's wrath. The SAMBEL men trap SAMCRO in the barn, as SAMCRO manage to get a van out, the barn then blows up. Elliott meets with Unser and explains there was no motive for Mayans to hurt Lumpy, which is what Unser is suspecting. Salazar blackmails Hale with a recording of him admitting guilt. Unser looks further into the buying of the street and realizes Hale owns all. Salazar then abducts Margaret and Tara. Note: Turas means Tour in Irish.
36	10	"Fírinne"	Gwyneth Horder-Payton	Kurt Sutter & Vaun Wilmott	November 9, 2010	3WAB10	3.18
The IRA wants proof that one of their own has flipped and SAMCRO intends to give it to them. Father Kellan makes a new deal with Jax - prove Jimmy sabotaged the club and they will then kill Jimmy instead. Salazar makes a call and speaks with Piney, who says he wants Alvarez dead and a quarter million from Alvarez home safe. Kozik suggests telling Alvarez straight up. Keith calls O'Neill to warn him SAMCRO are coming but O'Neill gets caught and tortured by SAMCRO. Jimmy turns up and a shootout on the roof breaks out. Clay realises Keith sold them out, catches him, removes his cut and pushes him off the roof. Clay presents the recording of the confession they got out of O'Neill to the Army. Tara asks Margaret what her lower back tattoo means, which was exposed when they were caught. Margaret states "another life" and explains she thought she was in love. Alvarez agrees to play dead for 24 hours but no longer. Jax and Trinity are caught kissing by Gemma and Maureen, who then explain they have the same father. Kellan threatens to withhold Abel and never return him to Jax, who flips and threatens to kill the Irishman watching over Kellan. Kellan then gives Jax the illegal orphanage address. Note: Fírinne means Truth in Irish.
37	11	"Bainne"	Adam Arkin	Dave Erickson & Regina Corrado & Kurt Sutter	November 16, 2010	3WAB11	3.40
While the club's on a manhunt, Jax faces the toughest decision of his life. Note: Bainne means Milk in Irish.
38	12	"June Wedding"	Phil Abraham	Story by : Kurt Sutter; Teleplay by : Chris Collins	November 23, 2010	3WAB12	3.27
With Tara held hostage by Salazar, Jax is forced to choose between revenge and the good of Charming. Jimmy's faith in his comrade is tested when he reaches out to the Russians. As Gemma tries to intervene in her son's dealings, Stahl makes a play to fulfill her bargain with Jax, turning on one of her own in the process.
39	13	"NS"	Kurt Sutter	Kurt Sutter & Dave Erickson	November 30, 2010	3WAB13	3.59
While the Sons figure out a way to have the Russian mob hand over Jimmy, Jax and Stahl's deal comes to a head. SAMCRO begins to heal old wounds. Meanwhile, just as Tara and Jax have solidified their relationship, Tara discovers more about Teller family history than she could have ever imagined.

== Home media release ==
The third season was released in the United States on DVD and Blu-ray on August 30, 2011.
