= Na Trioblóidí =

- Sons of Anarchy episode
- Episode no.: Season 2 Episode 13
- Directed by: Kurt Sutter
- Written by: Kurt Sutter
- Cinematography by: Paul Maibaum
- Editing by: Hunter M. Via
- Original air date: December 1, 2009
- Running time: 62 minutes

Guest appearances
- Adam Arkin as Ethan Zobelle; Ally Walker as Agent June Stahl; Taylor Sheridan as Chief David Hale; Dayton Callie as Wayne Unser; Mitch Pileggi as Ernest Darby; Jamie McShane as Cameron Hayes; Callard Harris as Edmond Hayes; Sarah Jones as Polly Zobelle; Jeff Kober as Jacob Hale Jr.; Henry Rollins as A.J. Weston

Episode chronology
← Previous "The Culling"	Next → "SO"

"Na Trioblóidí" (Irish for The Troubles), is the thirteenth and final episode of the second season of the FX television series Sons of Anarchy. It was written and directed by series creator Kurt Sutter. It originally aired in the United States on December 1, 2009.

This episode marks the final appearance of Johnny Lewis (Half-Sack Epps), Adam Arkin (Ethan Zobelle), Henry Rollins (A.J. Weston), and Sarah Jones (Polly Zobelle).

== Production ==
The episodes title: "Na Trioblóidí" is Irish for The Troubles; a three decade long ethno-nationalist conflict in Northern Ireland between nationalists, loyalists and British Armed Forces that occurred between the late 1960s to the late 1990s. The IRA depicted in the series is a fictionalised version of a dissident republican paramilitary called the Real IRA; a splinter group that was created after the Provisional IRA had a ceasefire towards the end of the conflict.

Kurt Sutter, series writer and creator, said that Half-Sack was killed off because Johnny Lewis wanted to leave the show due to creative differences; "We decided we'd find some noble way for him to go. It wasn't my intent to try to be sensational and kill off a main character."

== Plot ==
Stahl orders Zobelle released from prison, as he is an FBI informant with information on several high-up players in government and in the Aryan Brotherhood. Zobelle refuses police escort, and the Mayans arrive in Charming to protect their investment in him. Zobelle's plans to skip town are delayed while Polly says goodbye to Edmond. Weston is also released, as Chuck's testimony is deemed unreliable because he is an ex-felon. Weston retrieves his children from state custody and uses their presence to protect himself from SAMCRO's reprisal. SAMCRO is able to isolate him in the bathroom of a tattoo parlor, where Jax kills him with a silenced pistol. Cameron Hayes calls his son Edmond, and orders him to kill Agent Stahl to prove his loyalty to the IRA. Edmond retrieves a gun hidden in his bathroom but fails to execute her. Stahl kills him when he attempts to run, then texts Cameron from his phone claiming that the deed is done. Meanwhile, Gemma spots Polly shopping for flowers and follows her to Edmond's home. Polly goes inside and sees Edmond's body, and when Gemma follows her in with her gun drawn, Polly assumes that Gemma killed Edmond and tries to shoot her. Gemma shoots Polly in the chest before the latter can, killing her, and Stahl emerges, offering Gemma a chance to get out before she is pursued. As Gemma turns to leave, Stahl tosses Gemma her own 9mm, and Gemma catches it instinctively. Stahl trains Polly's pistol on Gemma and tells her to drop the gun; Stahl plans to use Gemma's fingerprints to frame her for both deaths. Gemma calls Unser, who picks her up before the Bureau of Alcohol, Tobacco and Firearms ATF can. Zobelle and the Mayans leave without Polly; SAMCRO takes off in hot pursuit. When Stahl reports the killing of Polly and Edmond over the radio, Cameron Hayes overhears over the report on a police scanner. Seeking revenge, he goes to Jax's house, holds up Tara, and kidnaps Abel. When Half-Sack tries to stop him, he is stabbed in the stomach. Jax arrives to find Sack dead, Tara tied up, and Abel missing. He calls Clay, who pulls the rest of the men pursuing Zobelle to rescue his grandchild. They chase Hayes to a marina, but it is too late: Hayes has disembarked in his gunrunning boat, Abel in tow.

== Reception ==
Ahead of the airing of the third season, IGN rated Polly Zobelle's and Edmond Hayes death #5 while A.J Weston's was voted #2 in IGN's "SONS OF ANARCHY'S BEST DEATHS". IGN commented on Weston's death by saying; "Rollins' final moment with his son, where he tells his boy to be brave for his brother and that he's always loved both of them, was a wonderfully complicated twist on an easy-to-hate character. And then he just sits in the bathroom stall - our final view of him is his boots still sitting up on the toilet seat. Even in death, he's rigid and unrelaxed. Because he was such a great character, I hated seeing Weston die, but in this case, the saying is true: it's better to burn out than fade away." Zach Handler of The AV Club gave "Na Trioblóidí" a B+ rating, stating; "The way things stand now, with Gemma on the run, and a grief-stricken Cameron kidnapping Abel, means, well, who the hell knows? The trouble brewing between Jax and Clay, temporarily put on hiatus, is bound to come back now—with Jax out of his mind with fear for his son, and Gemma's uniting influence, Daddy's memoirs may be making a come back very soon. After all, the lost baby comes, in a way, from the club's Irish connections, connections based on gun-running that I don't think Dad would've approved of in his day."
