= Ted Rooney =

American actor

- Education: Lewis & Clark College (BA); Temple University (MFA)
- Occupation: Actor
- Years active: 1996-present
- Known for: Legally Blonde; Boardwalk Empire; Gilmore Girls

Ted Rooney is an American actor and educator, known for his role as Morey Dell on Gilmore Girls, neonatologist Dr. Tabash on ER, and John McGarrigle on the HBO series Boardwalk Empire.

== Early life and education ==
Rooney was born and raised in Portland, Oregon. He is the seventh of nine children. He graduated from Grant High School, where his father, Ed Rooney, was a teacher and basketball coach. Rooney completed his undergraduate degree in theater at Lewis & Clark College and earned his MFA in acting at Temple University.

== Career ==
After college, Rooney played semi-pro basketball in Germany. He lived for six years in New York City pursuing theater, and he lived ten years in Los Angeles continuing with theater pursuits, commercial work and appearances on television. He currently resides in Portland, Oregon where he continues to pursue acting and teaches acting for television.

== Filmography ==
=== Film ===
Year	Title	Role	Notes
1996	Celtic Pride	Tony Sheppard	
2000	The Flintstones in Viva Rock Vegas	Confessor	
2000	Dancing at the Blue Iguana	Attendant	
2001	Monkeybone	Grim reaper	Voice
2001	The Man Who Wasn't There	Bingo Caller	
2001	Legally Blonde	Admissions Guy	
2002	Big Fat Liar	Boring Teacher	
2002	The Master of Disguise	Security Guard	
2002	Blood Work	Forensics #1	
2003	Cheaper by the Dozen	Principal	
2004	Envy	Upscale Auctioneer	
2007	Naked Under Heaven	The Boss	
2011	Bucksville	Dr. Don French	
2012	Gone	Henry Massey	
2012	Cell Count	Abraham Walker	
2012	The Kill Hole	James	
2012	Santa Paws 2: The Santa Pups	Mr. Miller	
2012	Sunshine Girl and the Hunt for Black Eyed Kids	Mother of Black Eyed Kid	
2013	Future Perfect	Tony	
2014	A Standing Still	Jack	
2014	Wild	Crazy Guy	Uncredited
2015	The Weather Outside	Daniel	
2016	Undeserved	Mark	
2018	Last Seen in Idaho	McNeely	
2018	Pretty Broken	Dr. Armstrong	
2019	First Cow	Fort Trapper	
2020	The Water Man	Edward Schaal	
2020	The Last Champion	Mr. McCormick	
2022	Showing Up	Ted	
2022	Losing Addison	Dr. Alfred Hunter	
2023	Somebody I Used to Know	Barry	
TBA	Golden State Killer	Dr. Reyes	
TBA	You Can't Win	Jack Black's Father	Post-production

=== Television ===
Year	Title	Role	Notes
1996	In the House	Candidate #2	Episode: "Record Breaking Time"
1997	The Pretender	Acupuncturist	Episode: "Jaroldo!"
1997	Profiler	Ben	Episode: "Blue Highway"
1997	Sliders	Technician	Episode: "Stoker"
1997, 1998	Sparks	Waiter / Detective	2 episodes
1997–1998	ER	Neonatologist Dr. Tabash	6 episodes
1998	Beyond Belief: Fact or Fiction	Preston Arnold	2 episodes
1998	Seinfeld	Crichton	Episode: "The Bookstore"
1998	The Closer	Mark	Episode: "My Best Friend's Funeral"
1998	Chicago Hope	Attendant	Episode: "Physician, Heal Thyself"
1998	Columbo	Mortician #2	Episode: "Ashes to Ashes"
1998	Sister, Sister	Edgar	Episode: "The Grass Is Always Finer"
1999	Santa and Pete	Tannery Man	Television film
2000	Just Shoot Me!	Harry	Episode: "With Thee I Swing"
2000	Star Trek: Voyager	Varn	Episode: "Live Fast and Prosper"
2000	Buddy Faro	Date	Episode: "The Match Game"
2000–2001	Roswell	Mr. Whitman	3 episodes
2000–2007	Gilmore Girls	Morey Dell	19 episodes
2001	Black Scorpion	Black Hand	Episode: "Crime Time"
2001	Jack & Jill	Karaoke Salesman	Episode: "Crazy Like a Fox, Hungry Like the Wolf"
2001	Nikki	Trent Turner	Episode: "One Wedding and a Funeral"
2001	State of Grace	Mr. Linquist	Episode: "Eve of Discussion"
2001	Earth vs. the Spider	Coroner	Television film
2003	The Tracy Morgan Show	Steven	Episode: "The Anniversary"
2003	Malcolm in the Middle	Fritz	Episode: "Christmas Trees"
2003–2005	Carnivàle	Flasher / Talker / Talker #1	4 episodes
2004	Joan of Arcadia	Dr. Halliwell God	Episode: "Recreation"
2005	CSI: Crime Scene Investigation	Denny Kingsley / Sherlock Holmes	Episode: "Who Shot Sherlock?"
2005	It's Always Sunny in Philadelphia	Curator	Episode: "The Gang Finds A Dead Guy"
2005	Night Stalker	Jeffries	Episode: "Malum"
2007	7th Heaven	Crossroads Deacon	Episode: "Inked"
2008	Assorted Nightmares: Janitor	Janitor	Episode #1.1
2008	My Name Is Earl	Cappy	Episode: "Sold a Guy a Lemon Car"
2009	Mental	Grayson Emerson	Episode: "Pilot"
2009	Weeds	Ingrid's Supervisor	Episode: "Su-Su-Sucio"
2009	Community	Marketing Professor	Episode: "Environmental Science"
2010	Leverage	Capt. Danny McCann	Episode: "The Bottle Job"
2010	Zeke and Luther	Snotsworth	Episode: "Treasure"
2010	Pair of Kings	Royal Tracker	Episode: "Where the Wild Kings Are"
2011	Boardwalk Empire	John McGarrigle	2 episodes
2011–2015	Grimm	James Addison	3 episodes
2015	The Librarians	Sheriff Heyer	Episode: "And the Fables of Doom"
2016	Camp Abercorn	Bob	Episode: "Pilot"
2016	Gilmore Girls: A Year in the Life	Morey	Episode: "Spring"
2017, 2018	Automata	Roscoe	2 episodes
2018	American Vandal	Sam Pinkerton	Episode: "Wiped Clean"
2018	Angie Tribeca	Bank Teller	Episode: "Freezing Cold Prestige Drama"
