= Sons of Anarchy season 2 =

Sons of Anarchy
- Season 2
- DVD cover
- Starring: Charlie Hunnam; Katey Sagal; Mark Boone Junior; Kim Coates; Tommy Flanagan; Ryan Hurst; Johnny Lewis; William Lucking; Theo Rossi; Maggie Siff; Ron Perlman
- No. of episodes: 13

Release
- Original network: FX
- Original release: September 8 – December 1, 2009

Season chronology
- ← Previous; Season 1 Next → Season 3

The second season of the American television drama series Sons of Anarchy premiered on September 8, 2009, and concluded on December 1, 2009, after 13 episodes aired on cable network FX. Created by Kurt Sutter, it is about the lives of a close-knit outlaw motorcycle club operating in Charming, a fictional town in California's Central Valley. The show centers on protagonist Jackson "Jax" Teller (Charlie Hunnam), the vice president of the club, who begins questioning himself.

Sons of Anarchy is the story of the Teller-Morrow family of Charming, California, as well as other members of the Sons of Anarchy Motorcycle Club, Redwood Original (SAMCRO), their families, various Charming townspeople, allied and rival gangs, associates, and law agencies that undermine or support SAMCRO's legal and illegal enterprises.

Introduced in this season are white separatists called the League of American Nationalists (LOAN). LOAN arrives in Charming with leader Ethan Zobelle and Zobelle's enforcer, A.J. Weston, seeking to drive SAMCRO out of Charming.

== Plot ==
White separatists called the League of American Nationalists (LOAN) arrive in Charming. LOAN's leader Ethan Zobelle and Zobelle's enforcer, A.J. Weston, seek to drive the Sons of Anarchy from Charming. To send a message to SAMCRO, Zobelle orchestrates to have Gemma kidnapped and gang raped by Weston and two others. Due to the improper handling of an internal problem, the rift between Clay and Jax continues to widen as Jax challenges most of Clay's decisions and comes to a head when a lone car bomb nearly kills another member of SAMCRO. The second season sees SAMCRO battling LOAN for control of Charming, Jax and Clay veering further apart in their individual visions for the club, and evading the ever-present threat of the ATF.

== Cast and characters ==
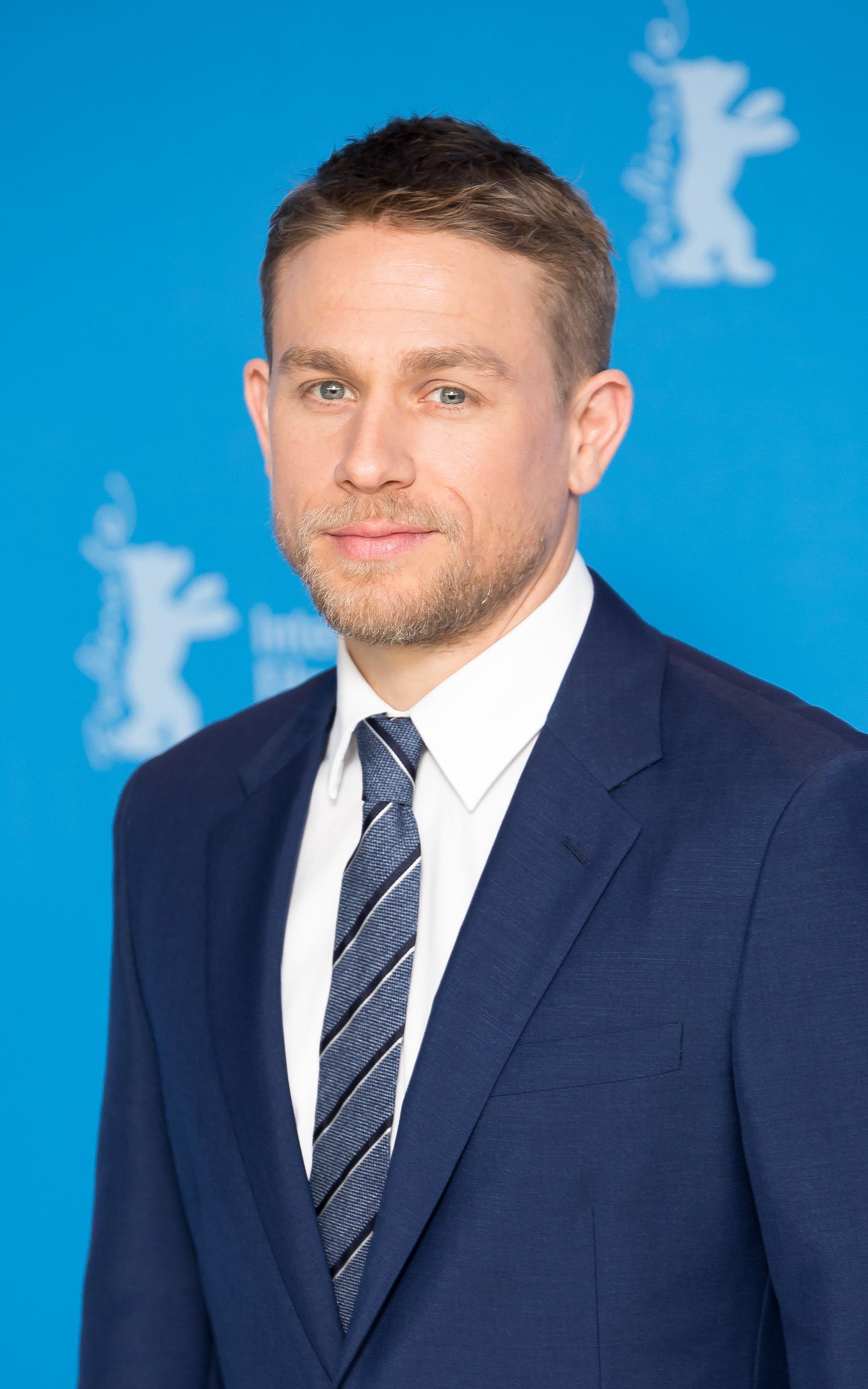
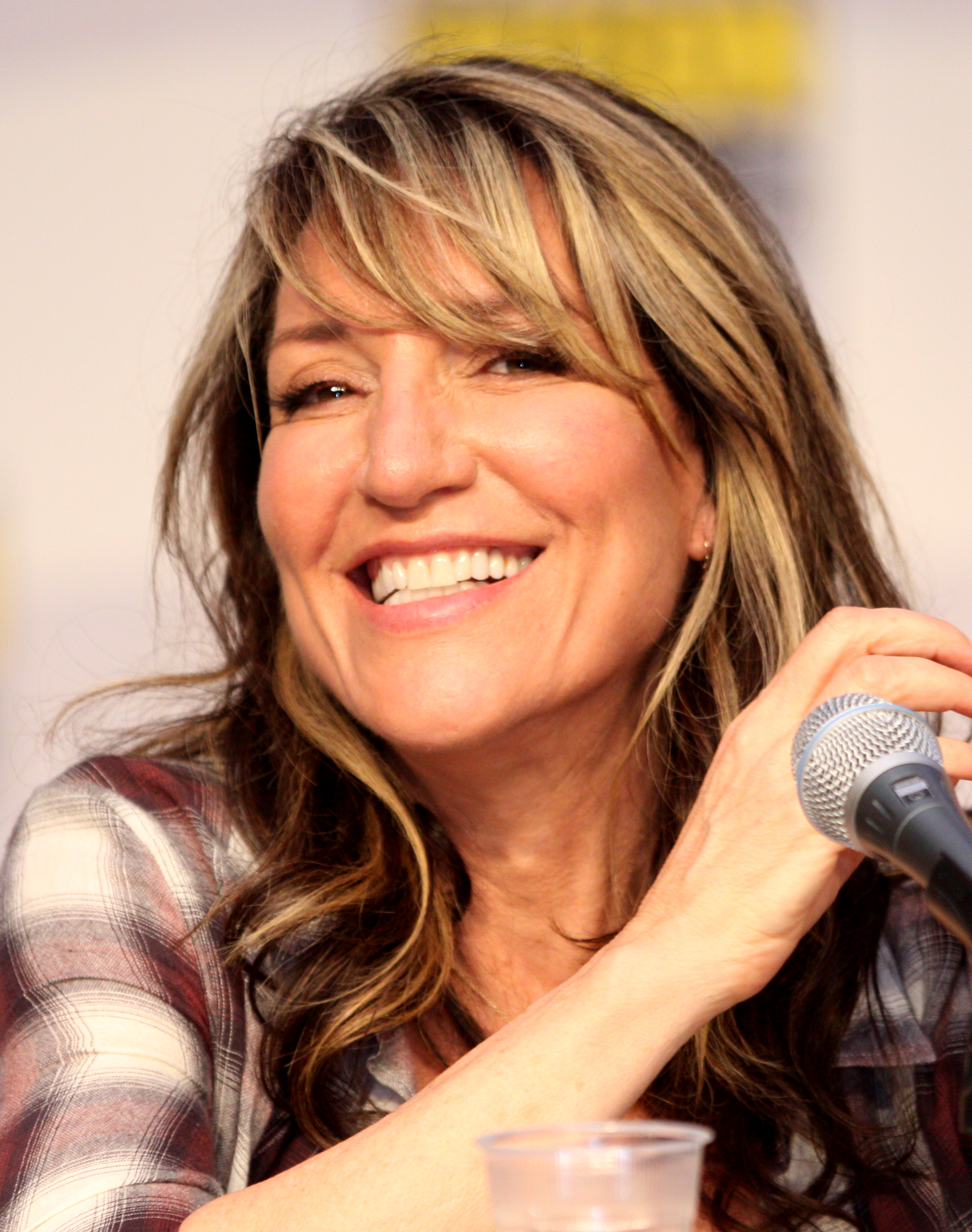
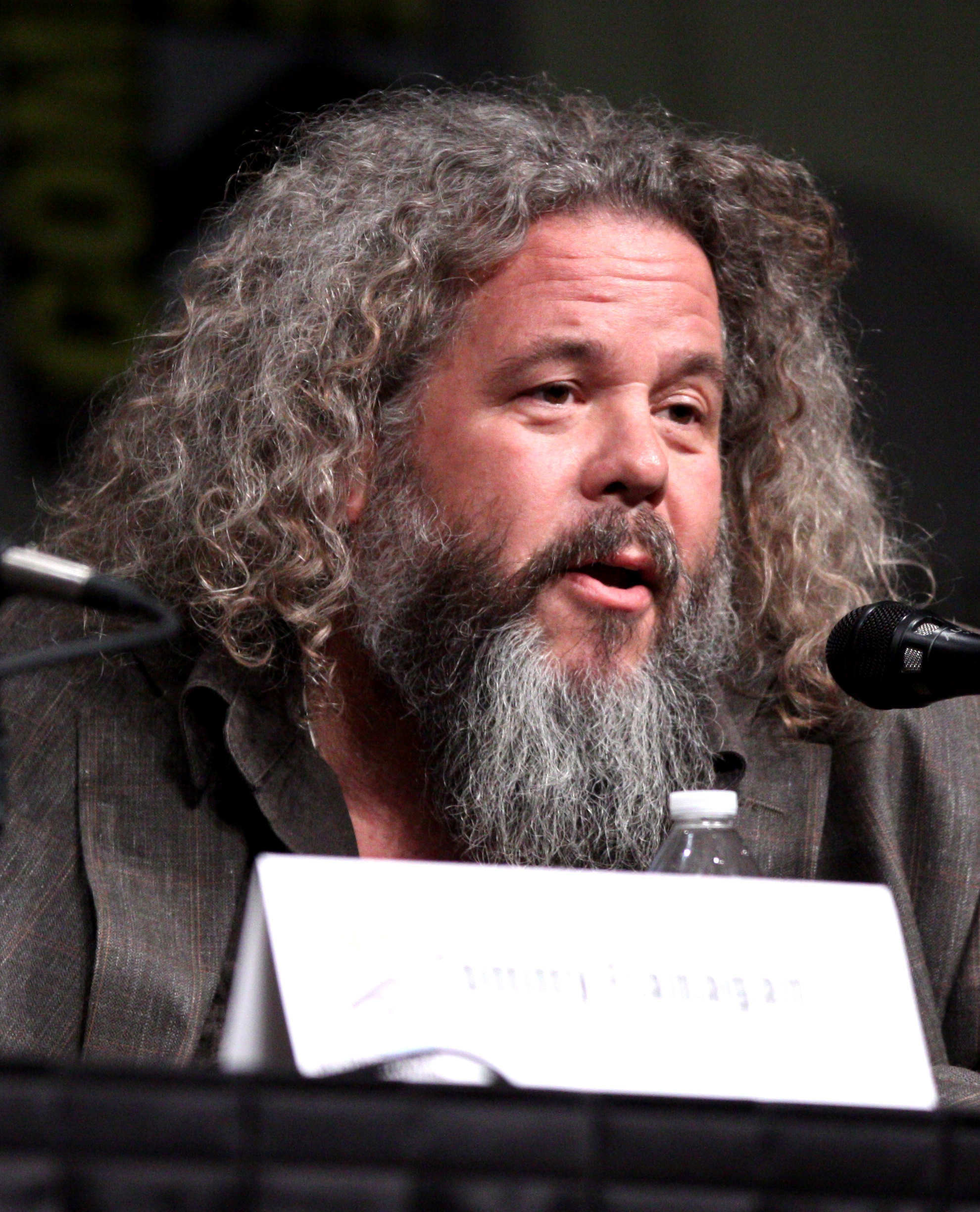
Charlie Hunnam (Jax Teller), Katey Sagal (Gemma Teller Morrow), and Mark Boone Junior (Bobby Munson)
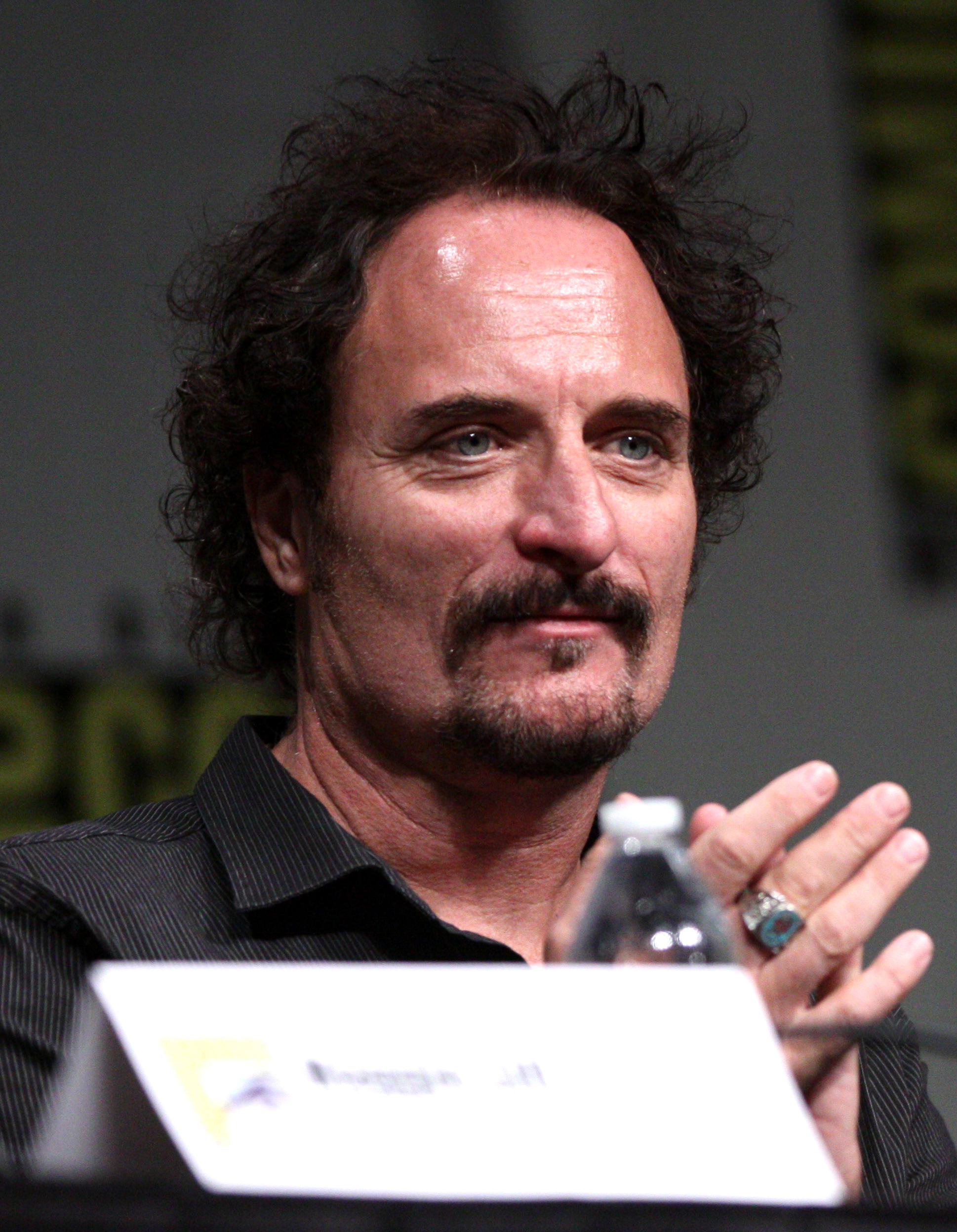
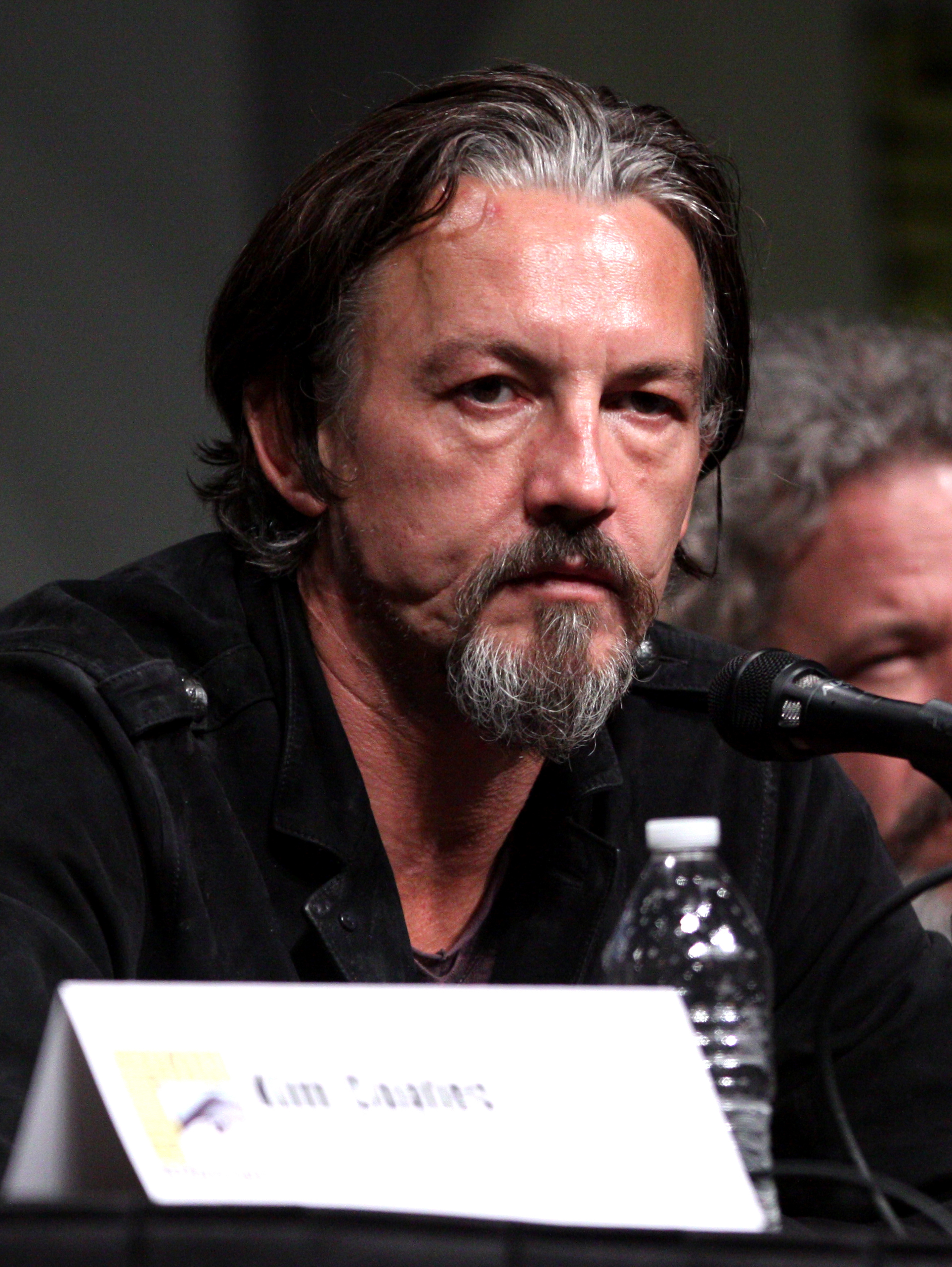
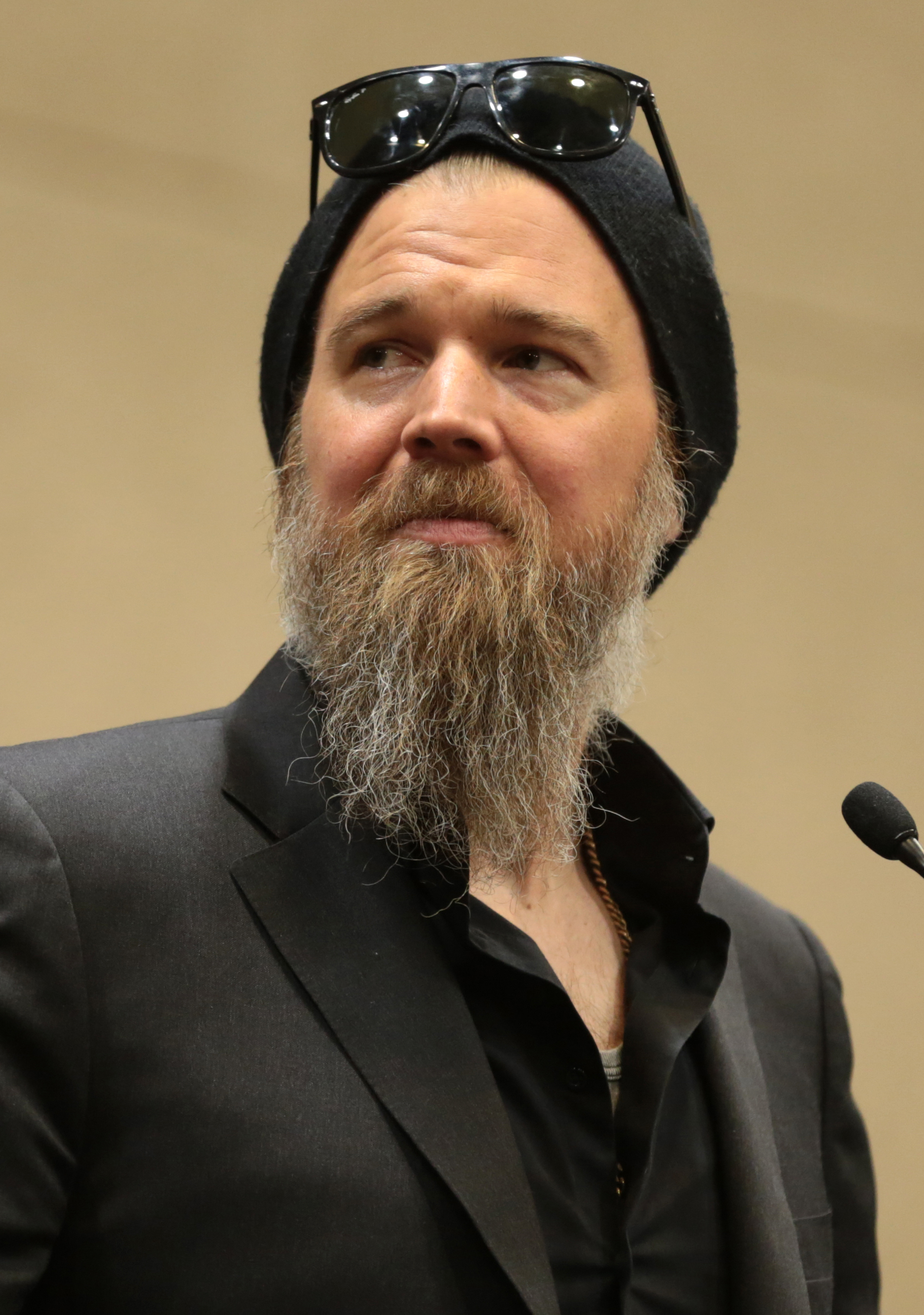
Kim Coates (Tig Trager), Tommy Flanagan (Chibs Telford), and Ryan Hurst (Opie Winston)
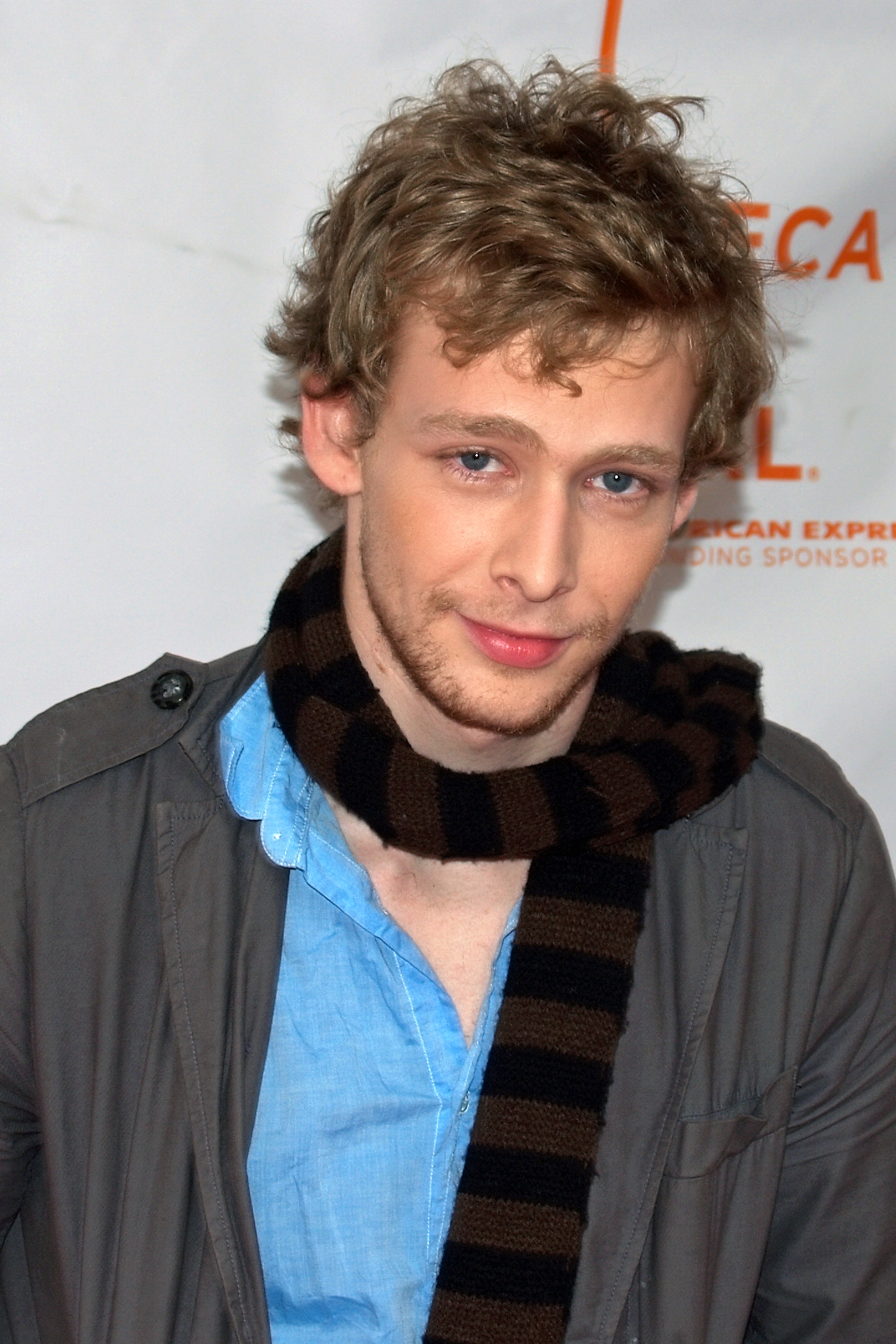
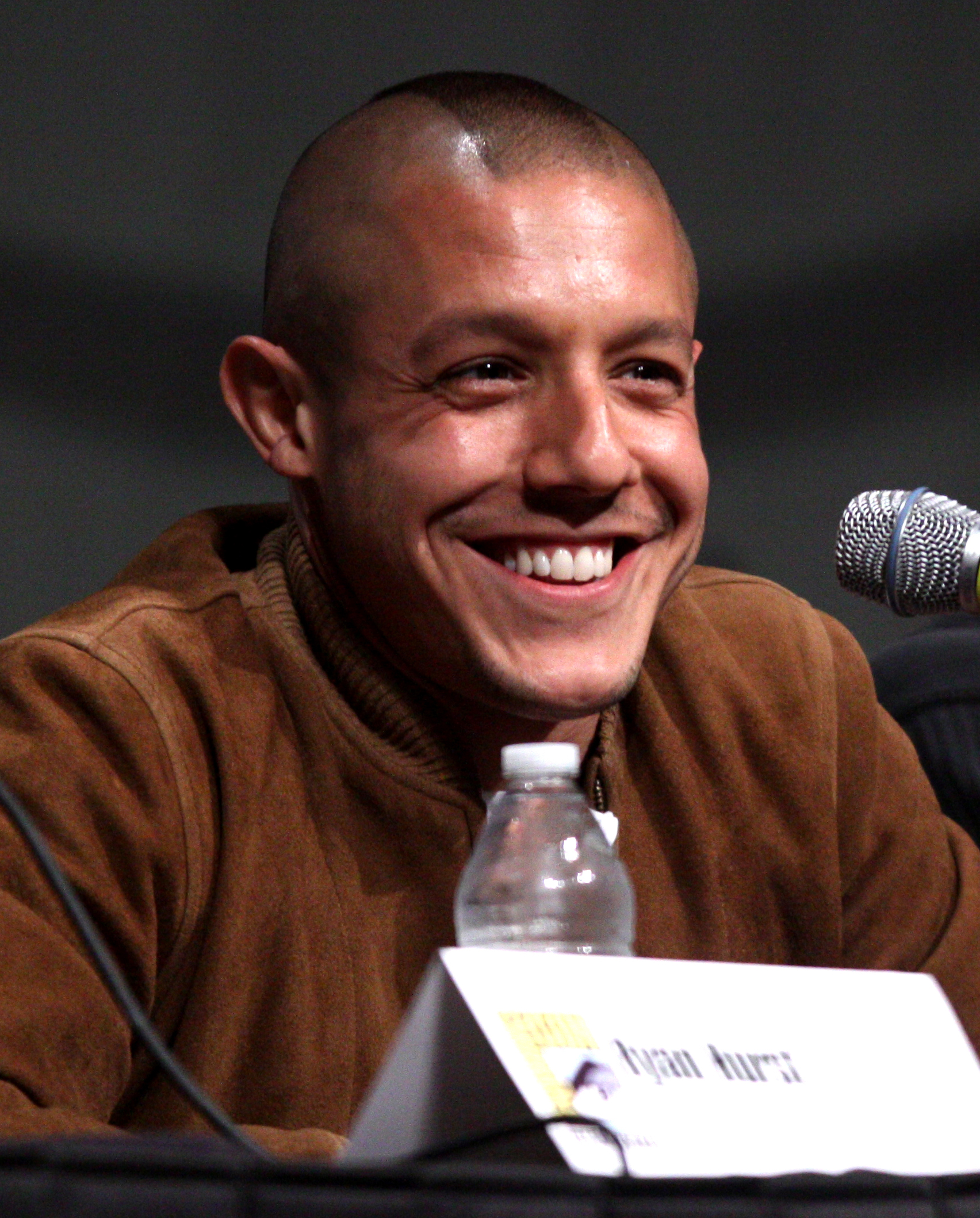
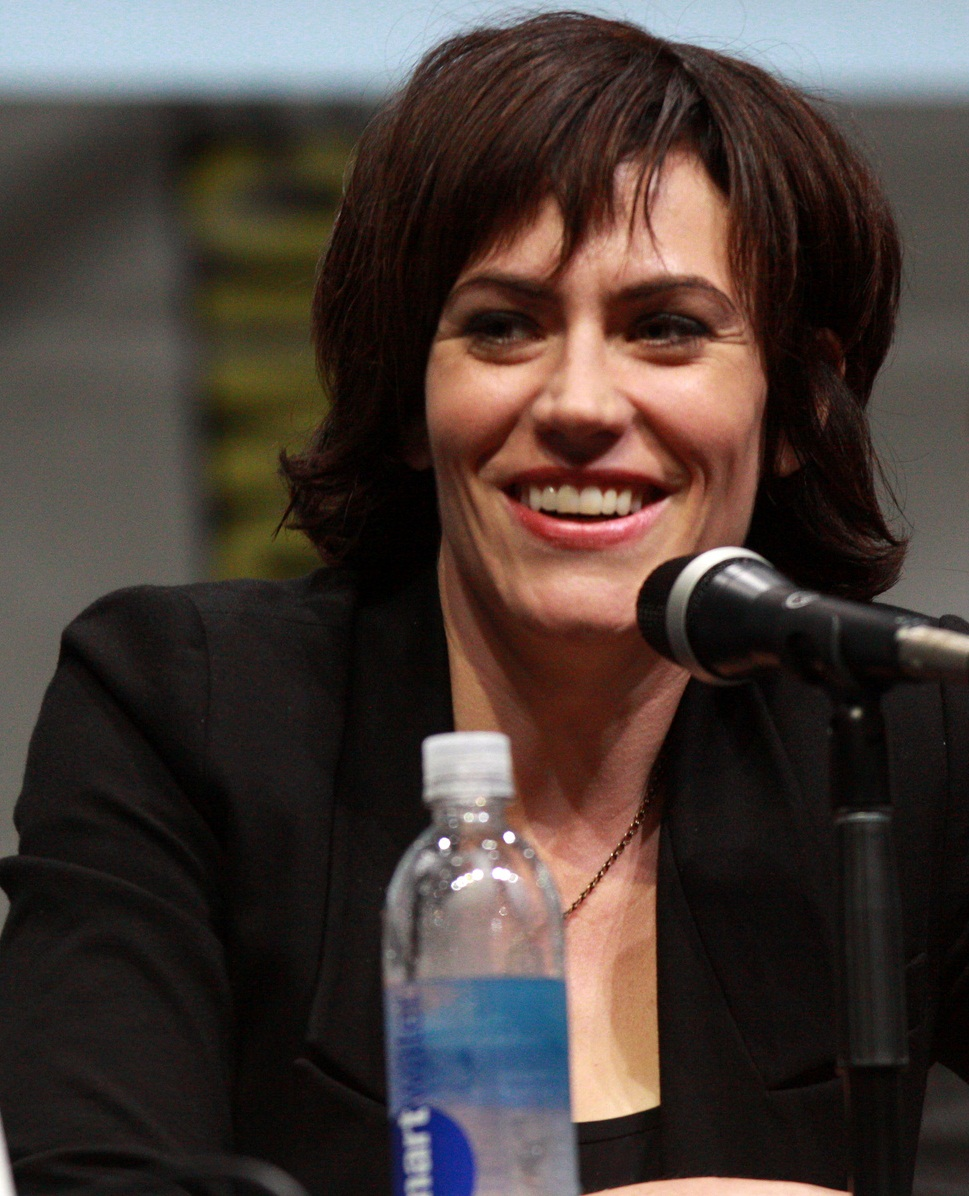
Johnny Lewis (Half-Sack Epps), Theo Rossi (Juice Ortiz), and Maggie Siff (Tara Knowles)
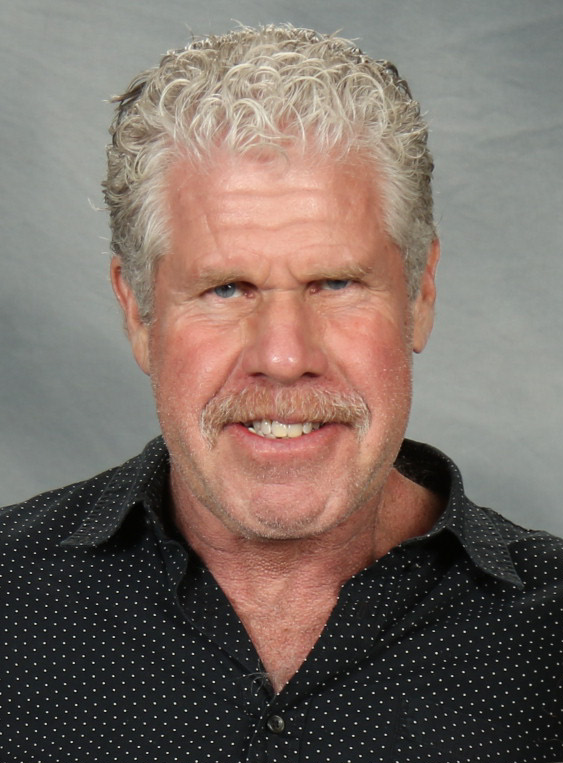
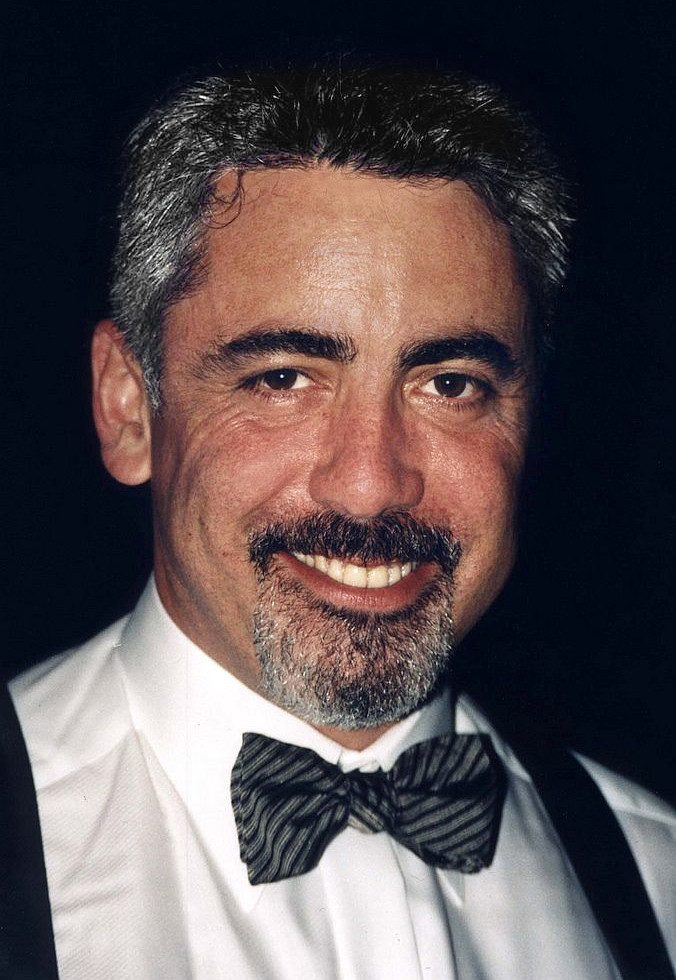
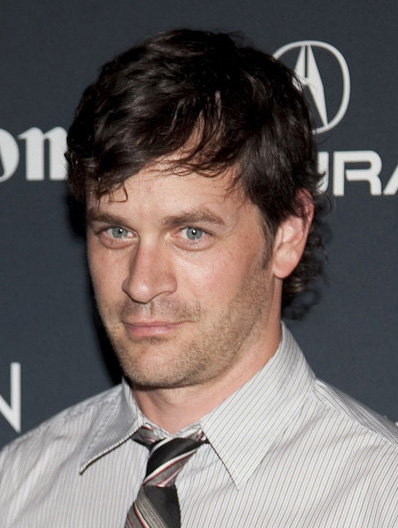
Ron Perlman (Clay Morrow), Adam Arkin (Ethan Zobelle), and Tom Everett Scott (Rosen)

=== Main cast ===
- Charlie Hunnam as Jackson "Jax" Teller, a disillusioned club member who is the vice president of the Sons of Anarchy Motorcycle Club Redwood Original in Charming. He discovers a written diary by his late father John that makes him question his life and the club. He is at odds with club president and stepfather Clay Morrow.
- Katey Sagal as Gemma Teller Morrow, Jax's mother and the queen of Charming. She is the matriarch of the club. She is married to Clay
- Mark Boone Junior as Robert "Bobby Elvis" Munson
- Kim Coates as Alex "Tig" Trager
- Tommy Flanagan as Filip "Chibs" Telford
- Ryan Hurst as Harry "Opie" Winston
- Johnny Lewis as Kip "Half Sack" Epps
- William Lucking as Piermont "Piney" Winston
- Theo Rossi as Juan-Carlos "Juice" Ortiz
- Maggie Siff as Tara Knowles
- Ron Perlman as Clarence "Clay" Morrow

=== Special guest cast ===
- Adam Arkin as Ethan Zobelle
- Ally Walker as Agent June Stahl
- Tom Everett Scott as Rosen

=== Recurring cast ===
- Dayton Callie as Wayne Unser
- Henry Rollins as A.J. Weston
- Taylor Sheridan as Deputy Chief David Hale
- Winter Ave Zoli as Lyla Dvorak
- Callard Harris as Edmond Hayes
- Jamie McShane as Cameron Hayes
- Sarah Jones as Polly Zobelle
- Julie Ariola as Mary Winston
- Mitch Pileggi as Ernest Darby
- McNally Sagal as Margaret Murphy
- Marcos de la Cruz as Estevez
- Kristen Renton as Ima Tite
- Kurt Sutter as "Big" Otto Delaney
- Emilio Rivera as Marcus Álvarez
- Tory Kittles as Laroy Wayne
- Bellina Logan as Fiona Larkin
- Michael Marisi Ornstein as Chuck Marstein
- Patrick St. Esprit as Elliott Oswald
- Dendrie Taylor as Luann Delaney
- Titus Welliver as Jimmy O'Phelan
- Kenneth Choi as Henry Lin
- Jeff Kober as Jacob Hale Jr.
- Glenn Plummer as Sheriff Vic Trammel

=== Guest stars ===
- Tom Arnold as Georgie Caruso
- Cleo King as Neeta
- Olivia Burnette as Homeless Woman
- Kenny Johnson as Herman Kozik

== Production ==
Although Sons of Anarchy is set in Northern California's Central Valley, it is filmed primarily at Occidental Studios Stage 5A in North Hollywood. Main sets located there include the clubhouse, St. Thomas Hospital and Jax's house. The production rooms at the studio used by the writing staff also double as the Charming police station.

External scenes were often filmed nearby in Sun Valley and Tujunga.

Kurt Sutter, series writer and creator, said that Half-Sack was killed off in "Na Trioblóidí" because Johnny Lewis wanted to leave the show due to creative differences; He said: "We decided we'd find some noble way for him to go. It wasn't my intent to try to be sensational and kill off a main character."

== Reception ==
The second season received critical acclaim. This season also saw a substantial increase in positive reviews in comparison with the first season. On Rotten Tomatoes, the second season has a rating of 93%, based on 15 reviews, with an average rating of 8.7/10. The site's critical consensus reads: "Sons of Anarchy continues to intensify the drama with riveting storytelling brought to life by a talented ensemble." On Metacritic the second season has a score of 86 out of 100, based on reviews 6 critics, indicating "universal acclaim".

IGN gave the second season an 8.4/10.0 rating, giving praise to Henry Rollins' character, AJ Weston, saying, "A decidedly stronger second season sees the gang unravel and knit back together."

Writing for Chicago Tribune, Maureen Ryan called the second season "engrossing". She elaborated that "the pacing is better [and] the plotting is tighter" and commended Sagal and Perlman for their performances. Variety’s Stuart Levine called the new season "compelling" and complimented the acting skill of Perlman, Sagal, Hunnam, and Siff. James Poniewozik of TIME called Sagal's performance "devastatingly powerful" and named the series on his list of Top 10 Shows of 2009.

== Episodes ==
No. overall	No. in season	Title	Directed by	Written by	Original release date	Prod. code	U.S. viewers (millions)
14	1	"Albification"	Guy Ferland	Kurt Sutter	September 8, 2009	2WAB01	4.29
SAMCRO is divided in the wake of Donna's death. Clay sets up a new gun deal with the IRA. Meanwhile, a white separatist group takes root in Charming and threatens more than just SAMCRO's control over Charming; the Michael Myers-like masked L.O.A.N. gang kidnaps and gang rapes Gemma, and tells her to stop SAMCRO from selling guns to blacks and other non-white gangs in Charming.
15	2	"Small Tears"	Stephen Kay	Jack LoGiudice	September 15, 2009	2WAB02	3.71
Police Chief Wayne Unser finds Gemma at the warehouse. Gemma calls Tara to her home for medical care. Unser crashes Gemma's car to make her injuries seem like the result of an auto accident. Luann Delaney's porn production company Cara Cara is raided by the ATF at the behest of Agent Stahl, who was attacked by Luann's imprisoned husband Otto months earlier. A rival producer, Georgie Caruso starts stealing Luann's talent, and after Jax and his men tell Caruso to back off, he hits one of her former girls, sending her to the hospital. In retaliation, the boys destroy Caruso's set. Jax has the idea to offer Luann the club's vacant warehouse as the site of a new studio with SAMCRO reaping half of the profits. The Mayans and the One-Niners both come to SAMCRO for weapons after the body of the Mayan Opie killed is discovered. A.J. Weston covertly photographs SAMCRO's initial meeting with the Niners. Zobelle informs the Mayans of SAMCRO's sale to the Niners and the Mayans ambush the exchange, and Bobby is shot in the process. Clay blames Jax for Bobby's injury, and warns Jax not to make decisions without consulting him first.
16	3	"Fix"	Gwyneth Horder-Payton	Dave Erickson	September 22, 2009	2WAB03	3.49
Jax and Tara's romantic day off is interrupted by a phone call from Luann, who is upset that Clay has sent Bobby to manage her bookkeeping without prior notice. Clay and Gemma also arrive on the scene, where they have a loud and public fight before Gemma breaks down crying. Bobby finds out that Luann has been skimping on payments to the club for years, and she sleeps with him to keep him quiet. Tara becomes protective of Jax when Ima, one of Luann's starlets, starts acting overly familiar with him. Zobelle and Jax each try to play Deputy Chief Hale against the other. Opie and Half-Sack discover that the Nordics are selling crystal meth in Charming, and shake down one of Darby's dealers to find out where the crank is coming from. When Hale decides not to move on the meth lab, the Sons of Anarchy do, and Opie barely makes it out after rigging the place to explode. Jax chides Opie about his death wish, reminding him that he has kids.
17	4	"Eureka"	Guy Ferland	Kurt Sutter & Brett Conrad	September 29, 2009	2WAB04	3.76
Gemma receives a package containing the mask that belonged to one of her rapists. She stakes out Zobelle's new cigar store and recognizes A.J. Weston as one of her attackers. Gemma follows Weston and prepares to shoot him, but hesitates when she hears him on the phone with his son. SAMCRO joins the rest of their club on a ride up to Oregon for a charity blood drive, and pick up handguns from Cameron Hayes to deliver in the process. When Bobby's malfunctioning bike drives Tig off the road, Tig is taken to a hospital, and after a nurse runs a background check on him, he is kidnapped by bounty hunters for an outstanding warrant. Jax argues that they rescue Tig, while Clay plans to continue with the gunrunning mission. After Tig incites the bounty hunters into attacking him, they take him to a motel, and Jax and Clay argue again over whether to rescue Tig immediately or at night, to avoid being seen. Jax rallies several of the men to leave immediately, and Piney drives a flatbed truck through the motel's wall to pull off the rescue. After the guns are delivered, Clay castigates Jax for his constant second-guessing, to which Jax reminds him of Donna's killing, which resulted from Clay's decision to kill Opie without a club vote. Clay tells Jax that if he ever mentions the incident again, Clay will kill him.
18	5	"Smite"	Terrence O'Hara	Chris Collins	October 6, 2009	2WAB05	3.66
Clay and the boys make an appearance at Zobelle's cigar shop, Impeccable Smokes, to demand protection money. In response, Zobelle has Aryan Brotherhood associates attack Otto Delaney in Stockton State Prison, gouging out his one good eye. The Sons brawl with Weston and his cronies in the street. Weston gives David Hale a DVD containing video footage of Hale accepting a gift certificate to Impeccable Smokes from Ernest Darby, and another with evidence that Opie destroyed their property. Hale and Unser fight about their respective connections to Zobelle and SAMCRO. Hale's brother Jacob has a state connection threaten to seize Elliott Oswald's real estate through eminent domain under pretenses of building a highway, and then makes a lowball offer on the property. Hale recognizes his brother's tactic and notifies Jax and Clay, who interrupt Jacob's meeting and tank the deal. Hale also warns the MC that Zobelle and Weston are surveilling them. Outside a store, Gemma recognizes the woman who abducted her and attempts to chase her down, but she is picked up by Weston. Tara then startles Gemma, and Gemma accidentally breaks her nose. As punishment, Tara tries to make her see a therapist to talk about her rape. Tara has doubts about her place in the club, and Jax shows her his father's manuscript. When Chibs tries to start a van at the auto shop, it explodes, and Chibs is sent flying.
19	6	"Falx Cerebri"	Billy Gierhart	Regina Corrado	October 13, 2009	2WAB06	3.31
Chibs is hospitalized in critical condition with a subdural hematoma. Unser and Juice Ortiz try and fail to scrub the evidence from the lot of the auto shop. Gemma gives Tara shooting lessons, and the two destroy Ima's car outside of Cara Cara. Zobelle moves on SAMCRO's gun connection, meeting with Cameron Hayes and his son Edmond. Clay is hasty to retaliate, and Jax, who fears a trap, capitulates, as he knows that the majority will want payback. Opie tells Jax that he is on Clay's side in their dispute. Unser provides Clay with the home addresses of Zobelle and Weston. Hale, who has resolved to help the club in their war on Zobelle, accompanies SAMCRO on a raid of Weston's house, but they only find his two sons. A frustrated Clay trashes Impeccable Smokes. Gemma tells Hale about the blonde woman who abducted her, and Ernest Darby identifies her as Zobelle's daughter, Polly. At Impeccable Smokes, Hale threatens to frame Polly for aggravated assault, and she tells Hale that her father is hosting a rally at a church in Morada. He brings her into the station to keep her from warning her father. SAMCRO storms the gathering expecting to find the equivalent of a Klan rally, but they instead find a quiet gathering with several families, who flee at the sight of the heavily armed Sons of Anarchy. Jax stops Clay from killing Zobelle on camera. The San Joaquin County sheriff's department arrives and arrests everyone but Opie, who is able to slip away.
20	7	"Gilead"	Gwyneth Horder-Payton	Kurt Sutter & Chris Collins	October 20, 2009	2WAB07	3.70
Agent Stahl returns to Charming on the heels of Cameron Hayes and the IRA, and Hale reluctantly catches her up on things, including the fracture between Clay and Jax. Behind bars, SAMCRO is eager to make alliances, and Laroy Wayne's cousin Russell offers the protection of the Black Guerrilla Family in exchange for the lives of two traitors. The gang use Juice as sex bait for the first traitor: Juice lures him to the infirmary where he is beaten by members of the Family. Upon his return to the prison yard, Juice is shanked by members of the Aryan Brotherhood. Opie frames the second traitor by planting cocaine in her car, then tipping off a SAMCRO ally, Sheriff Vic Trammel. When Trammel attempts to arrest the target, he is shot. Stahl interrogates Clay on the IRA, and wounds his ego by suggesting that Jax is the real brains behind the club. Upon returning to lock up, Clay slugs Jax, and Bobby stops the others from breaking up the ensuing fight so that Clay and Jax have the chance to sort things out. Stahl watches the fight with amusement until it is broken up. When Stahl interrogates Jax, he gives her nothing, but asks about Agent Josh Kohn, warning her that "it's dangerous to be a fed." Opie starts getting close with Lyla, a pornstar in Luann's employ. Gemma turns to Elliott Oswald for help posting the club's exorbitant bail, but he declines. Gemma shares a heart-to-heart with his daughter Tristen, who was also raped. Eventually, Elliott comes around, but he tells Gemma that Charming won't stay a small town forever.
21	8	"Potlatch"	Paul Maibaum	Kurt Sutter & Misha Green	October 27, 2009	2WAB08	3.39
Clay thanks Elliott Oswald by returning the bloody knife with Oswald's fingerprints. Oswald informs Clay that he'll be running against Jacob Hale for mayor of Charming, and asks for SAMCRO's support. Chibs' estranged wife, Fiona, shows up at his hospital bedside. Henry Lin and the Chinese mob are in the market for a new gun supplier, as the Mayans are quickly encroaching on their territory with weapons supplied by Zobelle's League of American Nationalists. They also foist Chucky Marstein back onto the Sons, who reluctantly take him to replace Bobby as Cara Cara's accountant. Clay visits Edmond Hayes to buy guns, but he is out of stock; the last of their supply was sold to the League, and Edmond is dating Zobelle's daughter Polly. SAMCRO attempts to steal the guns from Weston, but fail. Georgie Caruso's thugs rob Luanne's studio, stealing a camera and rough cuts and murdering Cara Cara's guard dog. Jax and his men retaliate, breaking into Caruso's studio with the help of Chucky, and steal back Luann's things. Caruso and his men retaliate by murdering Luann and dumping her body on the side of a road. Gemma plans a dinner with Tara and Lyla in hopes of burying the hatchet between Jax and Clay. At the dinner, Clay and Jax fight: Clay blames Jax's escalation for Luann's death and his absence for their failure to reclaim the guns. Jax retaliates that he isn't "the one murdering women." Gemma breaks up the fight by smashing a large platter on the table.
22	9	"Fa Guan"	Stephen Kay	Brett Conrad & Liz Sagal	November 3, 2009	2WAB09	3.52
Ernest Darby's brothel is busted, but two of his girls also work for Cara Cara. With pressure mounting on the porn production, Clay decides that the club will shut the business down and shift its attention back to gun smuggling, by helping the Chinese mafia re-establish their connection. Jax believes that Clay is trying to undermine his attempts to legitimate the club. Clay says that the porn business has already cost the club "an old lady," and Jax brings up Donna once again. Clay reminds Jax of his promise to kill him should he say her name again, and Jax offers him the chance, claiming that Clay needs a majority vote to close Cara Cara for good. Clay sends Opie, Jax, Bobby, and Tig to intimidate a customs judge who is overseeing the mafia's gun runner's case. Unser and Gemma attend church services together. Zobelle gives Hale the location of Darby's other brothel and meth lab in the hopes that he will back the League in their dispute with SAMCRO, but Hale lets SAMCRO take care of them. Darby, angry that he has been sold out, demands that Zobelle take action against SAMCRO. Zobelle sends Darby and Weston to burn down the warehouse where Cara Cara operates, and Weston knocks Darby out before leaving him for dead in the burning warehouse. The next day, Jax arrives at the fire, and believing it to be Clay's handiwork, declares that he is leaving the club and going nomad.
23	10	"Balm"	Paris Barclay	Dave Erickson & Stevie Long	November 10, 2009	2WAB10	3.38
Tara is suspended from the hospital when the administrator discovers that she coached Chibs on faking symptoms to extend his stay. Chibs is released and has a meeting with Jimmy O'Phelan, who excommunicated him from the IRA decades earlier, stole his wife Fiona, and raised their daughter Kerrianne. Jimmy wants Chibs to broker a meeting between Clay and the IRA to re-establish their gun trade; when Chibs refuses, Jimmy threatens the safety of his ex-wife and Kerrianne. Chibs turns to Agent Stahl, offering to inform on the IRA in exchange for his family's safety. Stahl and the ATF raid the IRA's safehouse and arrest Edmond Hayes. During a routine repossession, Opie and Half-Sack find crates of home-made bullets in a repo'ed car. They trace the bullets back to an Indian reservation, and make a deal with the tribe to buy bullets and psilocybin mushrooms. Tig samples the mushrooms and has a bad trip, breaking down over the guilt of killing Donna. Unser tells SAMCRO that Cara Cara was burnt down by a group of men, exonerating Clay. Jax apologizes for suspecting Clay and asks him if he still wants Jax gone; Clay says that he does. At a meeting, Jax secures the votes he needs to be released from SAMCRO, and Jax cuts the charter's patches from his vest. Desperate to keep her family together, Gemma comes clean about her rape at the hands of Weston. Jax reclaims his charter patches.
24	11	"Service"	Phil Abraham	Story by : Brady Dahl & Cori Uchida; Teleplay by : Kurt Sutter & Jack LoGiudice	November 17, 2009	2WAB11	3.48
Clay visits Jax at his home, and the two reconcile. Clay shares Gemma's story at a SAMCRO meeting; the club is thirsty for vengeance, but Clay urges a more strategic approach. Changed by his mushroom trip, Tig makes a pass at Gemma, and later asks a suspicious Opie why Donna was in his truck the night of her death. Opie beats a full confession from Tig, who places the blame at the feet of Stahl, and Opie drives off in a fury to find her. While stalking her, he witnesses Chibs leaving ATF headquarters. Opie holds her at gunpoint, but seemingly decides against killing her, before revealing that his magazine was in fact empty and handing it over. Jax tails Zobelle to a meeting with Marcus Alvarez. Knowing that Weston will see this as the ultimate betrayal, Jax brings the information to a meeting. Clay and an unhappy Chibs meet with Jimmy O'Phelan and renew SAMCRO's gun deal with the IRA. After he cools down, Opie asks Jax how he can forgive Clay and Tig, and Jax responds that Clay is Clay "because we made him." He gives Opie a copy of his father's memoirs. At the chapter meeting, Opie announces that he will stay with the club to help it change, but demands that the truth about Donna's killing not trouble his family again. He also relays that he saw Chibs with the ATF, but demands that the club hear him out. Chibs enters and comes clean of his own accord, and the group assures him that they will protect his family if he makes things right with Jimmy. Piney storms in and attempts to shoot Clay, fearing that Opie was going to seek revenge. He is stopped by the others, and Clay forgives him. Tig tells Clay that Gemma is afraid that Clay doesn't want her anymore; Clay finds her in the office and the two make love.
25	12	"The Culling"	Gwyneth Horder-Payton	Kurt Sutter & Dave Erickson	November 24, 2009	2WAB12	3.44
The members of SAMCRO bring their families to the clubhouse in preparation for war with the League. Chuck Marstein also shows up, having survived the Cara Cara warehouse fire, and testifies to the police about what he saw there. When the administrator of Tara's hospital gloats over Tara's impending hearing before the medical board, Tara punches her in the face and tells her to drop the charges, lest SAMCRO pay her a visit. Stahl and her new informant Edmond Hayes attempt to trap Jimmy and SAMCRO during a gun deal at the Army/Navy surplus store the IRA uses as a front, but seal the deal in Edmond's garage while Jimmy sends a decoy crate in an SUV to the surplus store. When SAMCRO arrives at the surplus store, the ATF attempts to bust their deal. Jimmy is nowhere to be found, and when the ATF and Edmond open the decoy crate, all they find are two dead rats. Jax tells A.J. Weston that Zobelle is in league with the Mayans; when Weston finds drugs in the League safehouse, he turns on Zobelle, killing his liaison to the Mayans and two Hispanic drug packagers. Jax has Unser call Child Protective Services on Weston's kids. Jax and Weston schedule a ten-on-ten brawl to the death at a warehouse in Charming, but it is broken up midway through by the police, who arrest Weston for the arson of Cara Cara. They head to Zobelle's cigar store, but the police meet them there as well and arrest Zobelle and his daughter Polly when the former reveals that he has stashed narcotics in the store.
26	13	"Na Trioblóidí"	Kurt Sutter	Kurt Sutter	December 1, 2009	2WAB13	4.33
Stahl orders Zobelle released from prison, Zobelle refuses police escort, and the Mayans arrive in Charming to protect their investment in him. Meanwhile, Weston is also released, as Chuck's testimony is deemed unreliable because he is an ex-felon. Gemma kills Polly. Stahl kills Edmond and sets Gemma up for his murder. Cameron hears on the police scanner that Gemma killed Edmond and follows Half-Sack to Taras house, intending to kill Abel as revenge. When Cameron threatens Abel, Half-Sack gets up to protect him and Cameron stabs Half-Sack with a knife, killing him. Cameron ties Tara to a chair and kidnaps Abel. Note: Na Trioblóidí means The Troubles in Irish.

== Home media release ==
The second season was released in the United States on DVD and Blu-ray on August 31, 2010.
