= Tory Kittles =

American actor (born 1975)

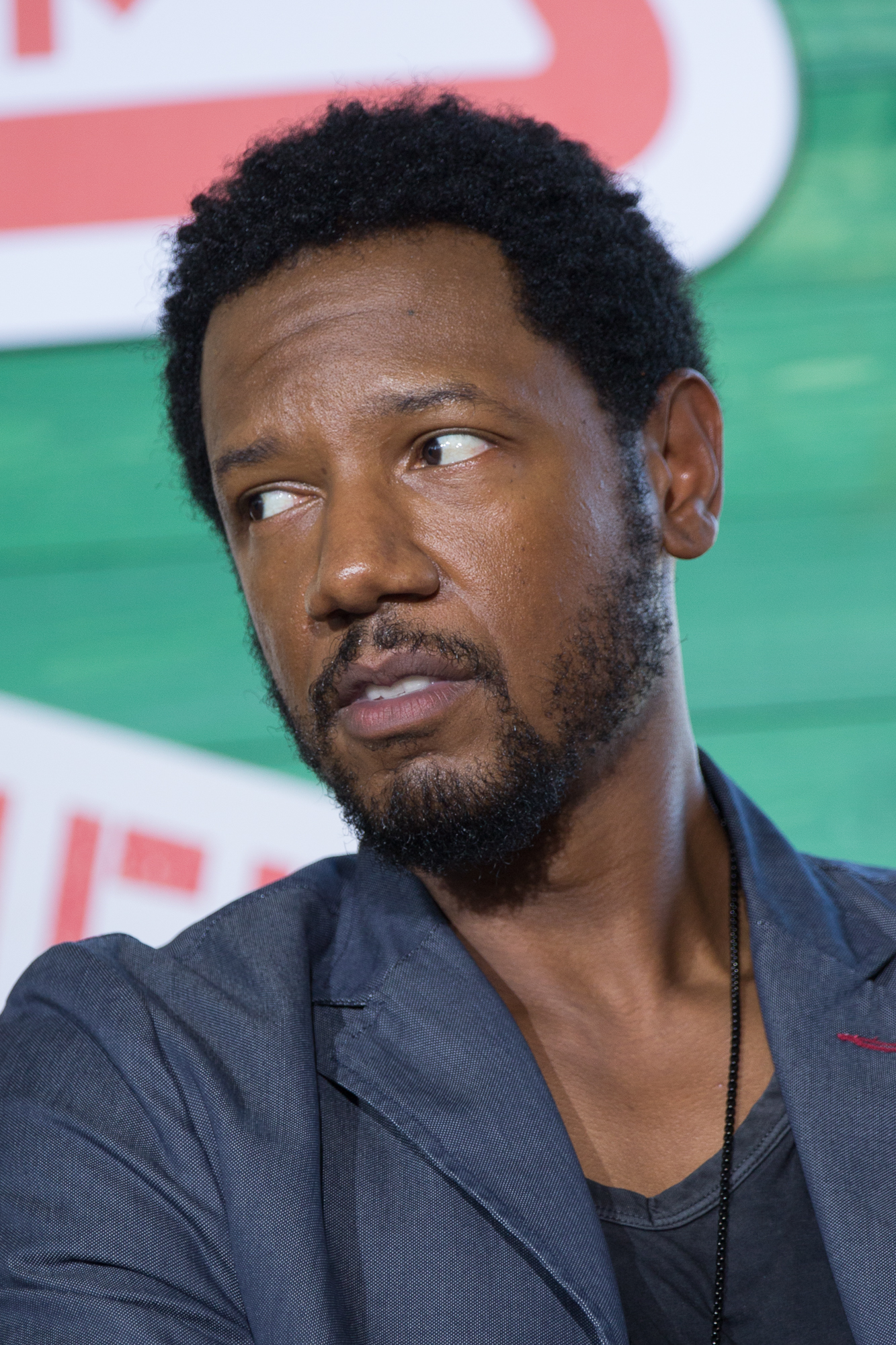
- Kittles in 2016
- Born: May 7, 1975 (age 51); Lawtey, Florida, U.S.
- Other name: TK
- Occupation: Actor
- Years active: 1999–present

Tory Kittles (born May 7, 1975) is an American actor, writer, and director known for his roles on the TV shows Sons of Anarchy, The Equalizer and True Detective.

== Early life and education ==
Kittles grew up in the small northern Florida town of Lawtey on a dirt road with a brother named Omar. His grandmother was a big influence on him, and she would have him and his cousins pick vegetables as children, "We picked vegetables and potatoes and corn. We grew our own things." She was the reason he enjoys spending time in nature.

== Career ==
Tory Kittles jumped to the big screen fairly quickly, attracting the attention of big name directors like Joel Schumacher. His early supporting roles in Tigerland (2000) directed Schumacher credited him alongside Neil Brown Jr., with writing the song "Looking for Charlie". Other supporting roles included Phone Booth (2002), which paved the way to larger roles in television programs. He has appeared in the films Malibu's Most Wanted (2003), Get Rich or Die Tryin' (2005), Next (2007), Miracle at St. Anna (2008), and Dragged Across Concrete (2018). He is known mostly for his television roles; he portrayed Laroy in Sons of Anarchy (2008–2011), Clarence in Bessie alongside Queen Latifah, and Broussard in Colony (2016–2018) where he starred opposite Josh Holloway and Sarah Wayne Callies. He has also appeared in True Detective (2014) and as Detective Marcus Dante in The Equalizer (2021–2025) where he reunited with actress Queen Latifah again.

In 2021, Kittles starred in an action thriller film Those Who Wish Me Dead with Angelina Jolie, as well as in Sundance 2020's Wander Darkly along with Siena Miller and Diego Luna, and portrayed Frederick Douglass in the Cynthia Erivo Academy Award nominated Harriet. In 2024, Kittles starred as Cephus in a Broadway revival and Tony nominated play of Samm-Art Williams's Home alongside Stori Ayers and Brittany Inge.

== Filmography ==
=== Film ===
Year	Title	Role	Notes
1999	Instinct	Prisoner	
2000	Tigerland	Ryan	
2002	Phone Booth	Reporter #3	
2003	Malibu's Most Wanted	"Deuce"	
2004	Against the Ropes	Devon Green	
2004	Paparazzi	David	
2005	Little Athens	Sinjin	
2005	Get Rich or Die Tryin'	Justice	
2005	Dirty	Officer Wallace	
2007	Next	FBI Agent Cavanaugh	
2008	Stop-Loss	Josh	
2008	Miracle at St. Anna	Lieutenant Birdsong	
2009	A Perfect Getaway	Sherman/Kayaker	
2010	The Chameleon	Dan Price	
2012	The Sapphires	Robby	
2012	The Kill Hole	Sergeant Devon Carter	
2013	Olympus Has Fallen	Secret Service Agent Jones	
2014	American Heist	Ray	
2015	Man Down	Sergeant Miller	
2017	Lawman	Bass Reeves	Short
2018	Dragged Across Concrete	Henry Johns	
2019	Harriet	Frederick Douglass	
2020	Wander Darkly	Liam	
2021	Those Who Wish Me Dead	Ryan	
2023	Among the Beasts	LT	

=== Television ===
Year	Title	Role	Notes
2000	The Real Whatever	Marcus #2	Recurring cast
2000	Grosse Pointe	Sound Guy	Episode: "Satisfaction"
2001	Invincible	Ray Jackson	TV movie
2002	Big Shot: Confessions of a Campus Bookie	Stevin "Hedake" Smith	TV movie
2004	Frankenfish	Sam Rivers	TV movie
2005	CSI: NY	Sean Bally	Episode: "Hush"
2007	House, M.D.	Derek Hoyt	Episode: "Words and Deeds"
2008–11	Sons of Anarchy	Laroy Wayne	Recurring cast: (season 1-2 & 4), guest (season 3)
2009	Fear Clinic	Jonte	Recurring cast
2012	CSI: Miami	Delonte Cassell	Episode: "Law & Disorder"
2012	Steel Magnolias	Jackson Latcherie	TV movie
2014	True Detective	Thomas Papania	Main cast (season 1)
2014	Intruders	Gary Fischer	Main cast
2015	Bessie	Clarence Smith	TV movie
2016	The Catch	Brian Brooks	Episode: "The Benefactor"
2016	Good Girls Revolt	Edward	Episode: "The Year-Ender"
2016–18	Colony	Eric Broussard	Main cast
2021–25	The Equalizer	Marcus Dante	Main cast
