= Mayans M.C. season 2 =

American TV show season

Mayans M.C.
- Season 2
- Promotional poster
- Starring: J. D. Pardo; Clayton Cardenas; Sarah Bolger; Michael Irby; Carla Baratta; Richard Cabral; Raoul Max Trujillo; Antonio Jaramillo; Danny Pino; Edward James Olmos
- No. of episodes: 10

Release
- Original network: FX
- Original release: September 3 – November 5, 2019

Season chronology
- ← Previous; Season 1 Next → Season 3

The second season of Mayans M.C., an American crime drama created by Kurt Sutter and Elgin James, premiered on FX on September 3, 2019 and concluded on November 5, 2019. The second season consisted of ten episodes and aired on Tuesdays in the United States on FX.

== Production ==
In October 2018, it was announced that FX had renewed the series for a second season. In August 2019, series co-creator and executive producer Kurt Sutter announced that he would leave the series if it was renewed for a third season. Sutter said: "It's time for the white man to leave the building." In October 2019, Sutter was removed from his position as co-showrunner on Mayans M.C. while its second season was still airing. Sutter believes that his jokes about Disney after the Disney-Fox merger is what led to his dismissal.

=== Casting ===
Series co-creator Kurt Sutter had expressed interest in bringing in more characters from Mayans' predecessor Sons of Anarchy.

== Cast and characters ==
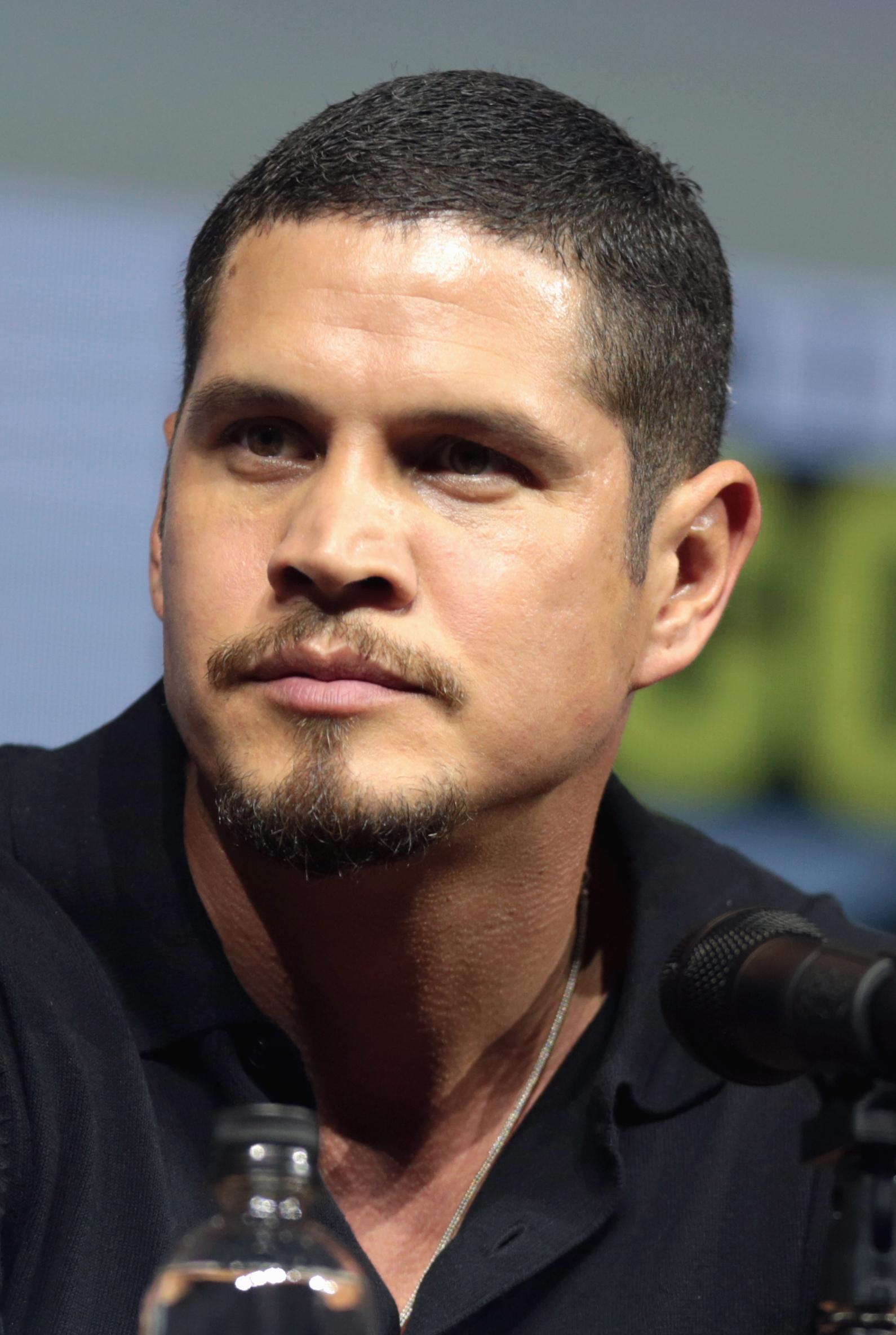
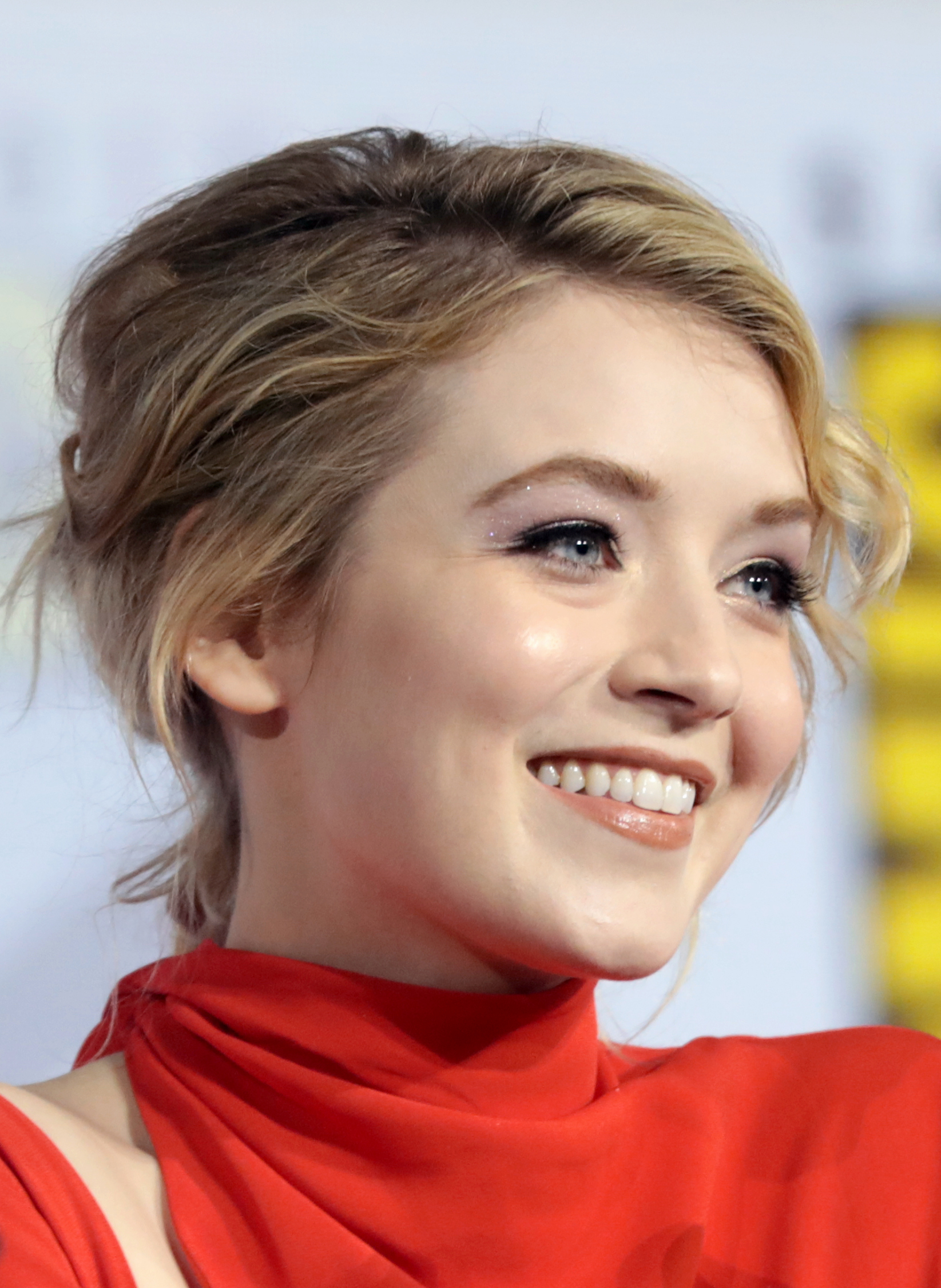
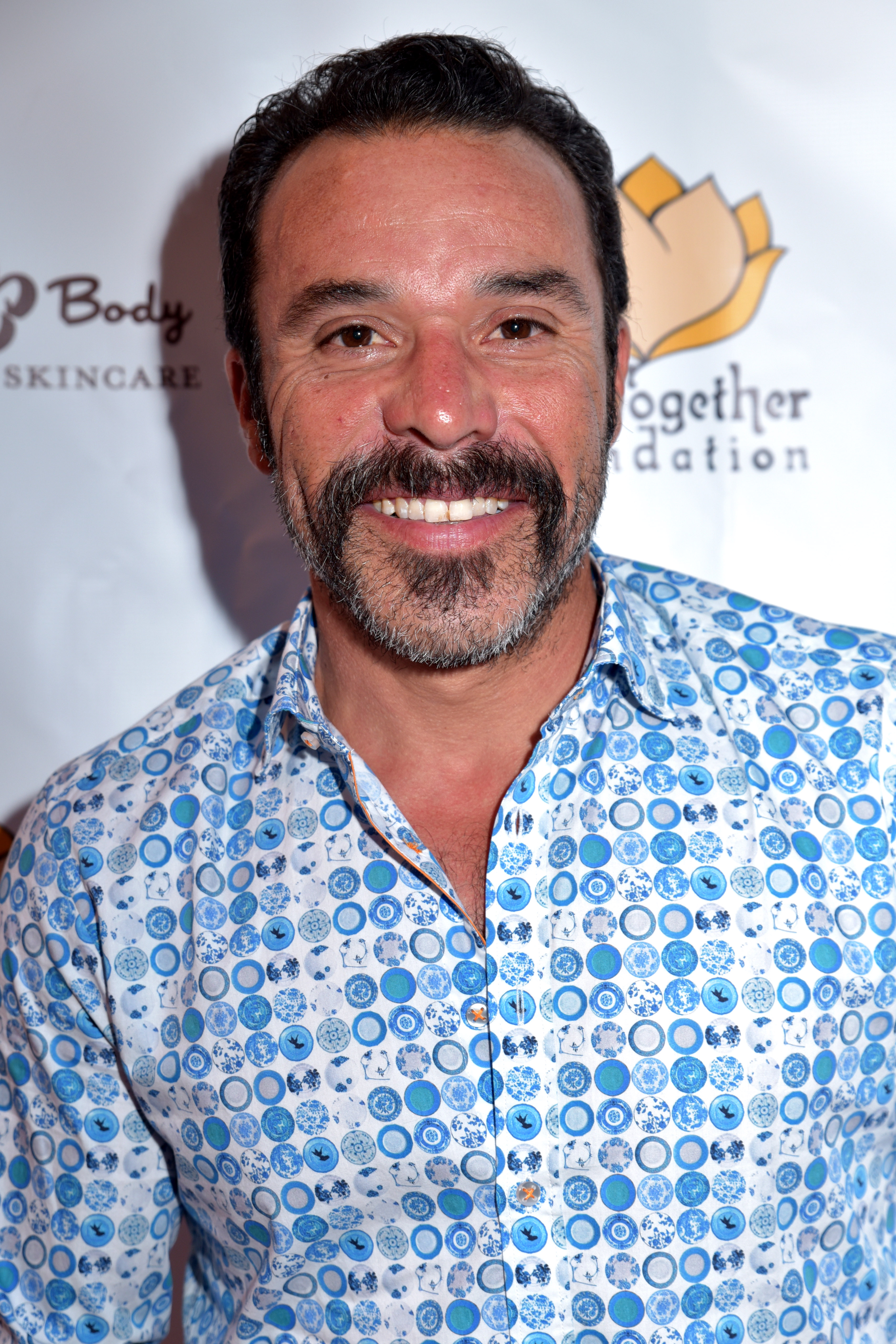
J. D. Pardo (Ezekiel "EZ" Reyes), Sarah Bolger (Emily Thomas), and Michael Irby (Obispo "Bishop" Losa)
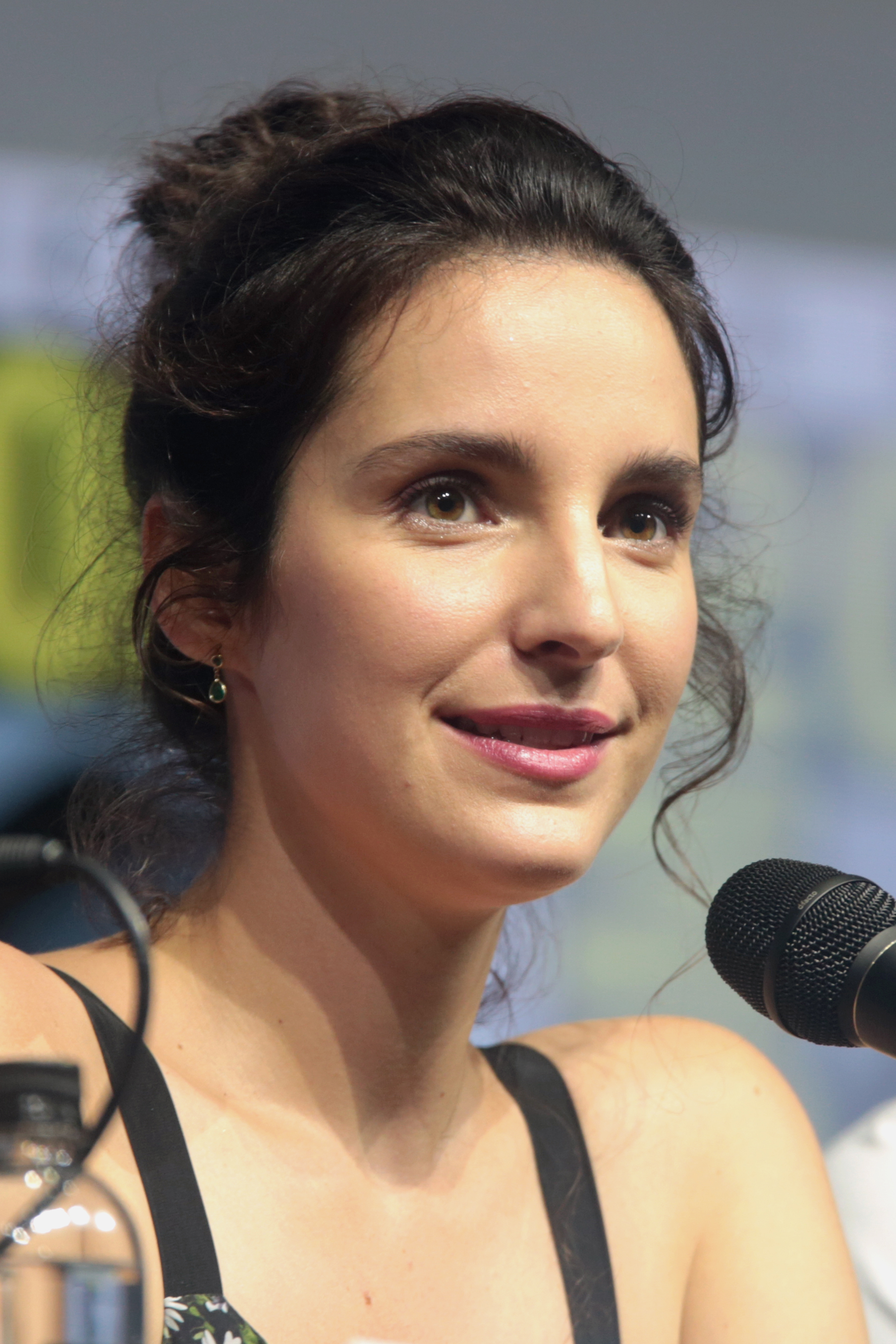
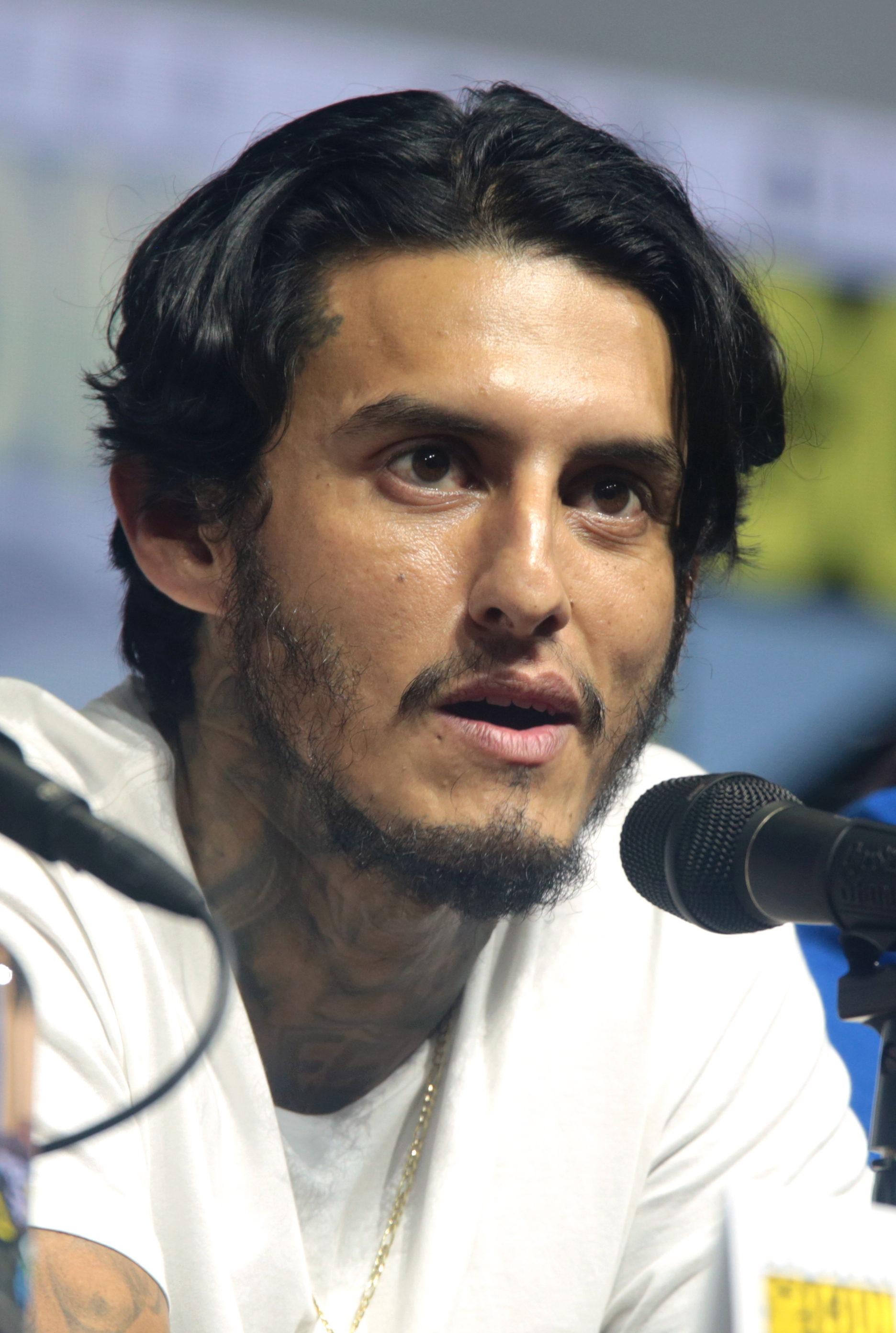
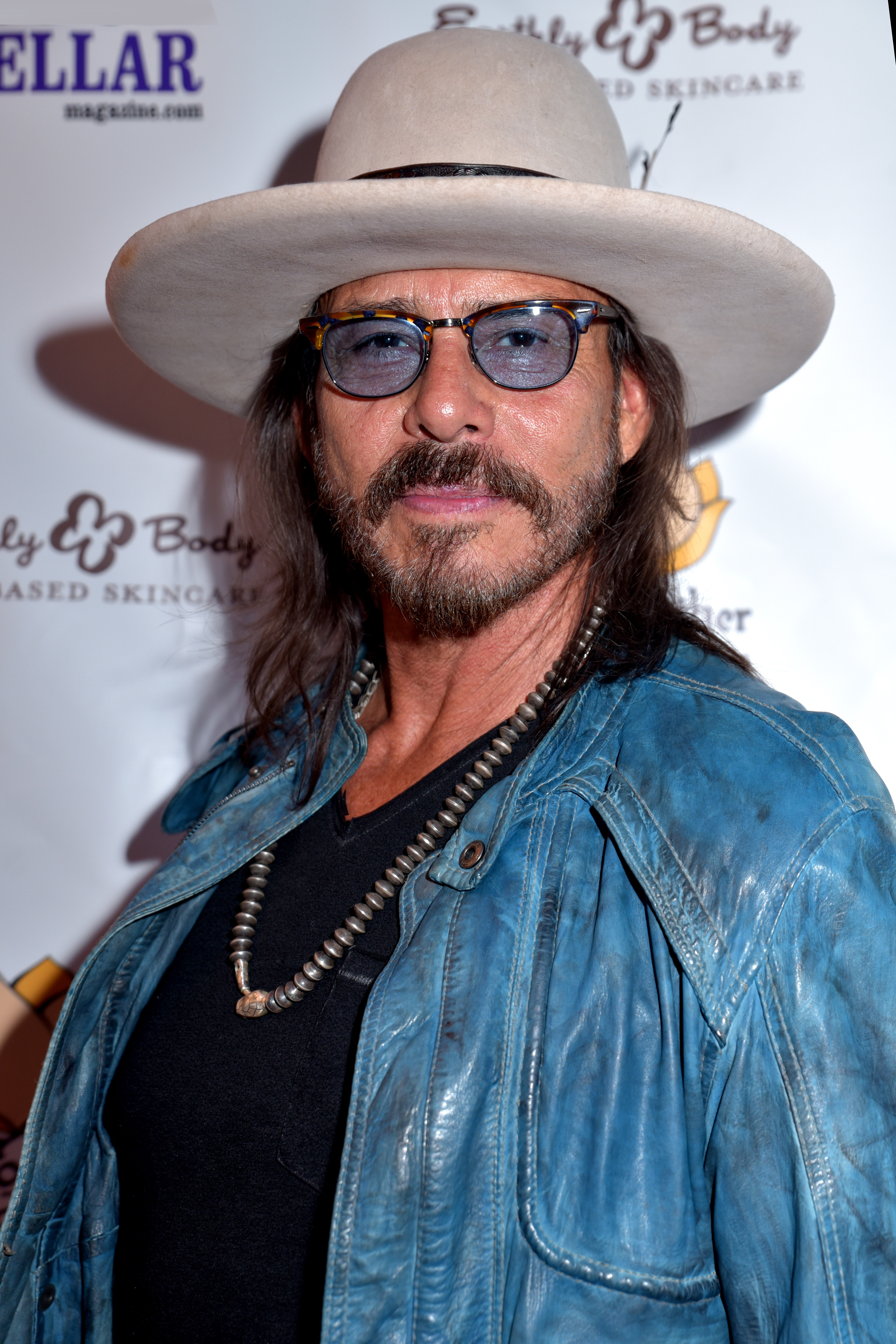
Carla Baratta (Adelita), Richard Cabral (Johnny "El Coco" Cruz), and Raoul Trujillo (Che "Taza" Romero)

=== Main ===
- J. D. Pardo as Ezekiel "EZ" Reyes, prospect for the Mayans and brother to Angel Reyes.
- Clayton Cardenas as Angel Reyes, EZ's brother and Él Secretario of Mayans M.C., Santo Padre Charter
- Sarah Bolger as Emily Thomas, childhood sweetheart of EZ, who is now married to Miguel Galindo, and the mother of their infant son.
- Michael Irby as Obispo "Bishop" Losa, president of Mayans M.C.'s Santo Padre Charter.
- Carla Baratta as Adelita, who as a child, watched her family die at the hands of the Galindo cartel.
- Richard Cabral as Johnny "El Coco" Cruz, a full patch member of Mayans M.C.
- Raoul Trujillo as Che "Taza" Romero, Vice Presidente of Mayans M.C., Santo Padre Charter.
- Antonio Jaramillo as Michael "Riz" Ariza, a full patch member of Mayans M.C.
- Danny Pino as Miguel Galindo, the son of Galindo Cartel founder Jose Galindo.
- Edward James Olmos as Felipe Reyes, the once-strong Mexican patriarch and Angel and EZ's father.
- Emilio Rivera as Marcus Álvarez, Consejero to Miguel Galindo, former president of the Mayans M.C. Oakland Charter and national president of the Mayans M.C., cousin of Obispo "Bishop" Losa

=== Special guests ===
- David Labrava as Happy Lowman, SAMCRO Sergeant-at-Arms, who is responsible for the death of EZ and Angel's mother.
- Robert Patrick as Les Packer, SAMDINO President.
- Tommy Flanagan as Filip "Chibs" Telford, SAMCRO President.
- Jacob Vargas as Allesandro Montez, the SAMCRO Road Captain.
- Rusty Coones as Rane Quinn, member of SAMCRO.

=== Recurring ===
- Vincent Vargas as Gilberto "Gilly" Lopez, a good-natured MMA fighter who rides for the Santo Padre Chapter of the Mayans M.C.
- Ray McKinnon as Lincoln Potter, reprising his role from Sons of Anarchy.
- Ada Maris as Dita Galindo, Miguel's mother and Jose Galindo's widow.
- Gino Vento as Nestor Oceteva, Miguel's chief of security.
- Edwin Hodge as Officer Franky Rogan.
- Michael Ornstein as Chuck "Chucky" Marstein, reprising his role from Sons of Anarchy.
- Frankie Loyal Delgado as Hank "El Tranq" Loza, Sergeant-at-Arms / El Pacificador of the Mayans M.C.
- Efrat Dor as Katrina, Lincoln's assistant
- Ivo Nandi as Oscar "El Oso" Ramos, reprising his role from Sons of Anarchy.
- Malaya Rivera Drew as Ileana, an old friend of Emily now working for the city council.
- Mía Maestro as Sederica Palomo, a Mexican politician.

== Episodes ==
No. overall	No. in season	Title (Note: The episode titles are named after Mayan gods.)	Directed by	Written by	Original release date	Prod. code	U.S. viewers (millions)
11	1	"Xbalanque"	Kevin Dowling	Kurt Sutter	September 3, 2019	2WBD01	1.39
Ezekiel is mere weeks away from getting past "Prospect" status and getting voted in or out of the club properly. His new sponsor Bishop; the club's president, seems impressed with EZ's performance, as does the rest of the M.C. overall. However, a divided Reyes family has let tension set within the club. EZ comes closer to cracking into Happy Lowman's involvement with killing operations for SAMCRO, including the murder of EZ's mother.
12	2	"Xaman-Ek"	Sebastian "Batán" Silva	Sean Tretta & Andrea Ciannavei	September 10, 2019	2WBD02	1.06
EZ reveals the truth to Angel about their mother's death, and that he got information on the side about her killer. He recognized the man as Happy Lowman; a member of SAMCRO. Angel visits Adelita, who's pregnant with their child. On their way to Stockton, Angel and EZ get into trouble with the Swole Boys, a biker club who tries to claim the highway as their territory but find themselves quickly outclassed, twice. Emily learns they have competitors on the construction project for the City Council. Dita escapes her bodyguards and visits Felipe, who then drives her home. While the club visits Mayan's Stockton Charter, EZ witnesses one of their members, Medina, is shot dead by two dirty cops.
13	3	"Camazotz"	Guy Ferland	Elgin James & Jenny Lynn	September 17, 2019	2WBD03	1.12
The Reyes brothers settle their differences and team up together to help with the investigation of Happy's killing of their mother. The Mayans get revenge by brutally killing the cop who shot Medina. After the funeral, Angel and EZ travel to Charming and break into Happy's house, holding him at gunpoint. Meanwhile, Potter wants Miguel to implicate Mexican politician Sederica Palomo in something dirty because he believes she's allied with Adelita. Emily reaches out to Ileana, an old friend who now works at the city council. Ileana is in dire need of money and Emily offers it in exchange for information about their rivals in the construction project.
14	4	"Lahun Chan"	Rebecca Rodriguez	Bryan Gracia	September 24, 2019	2WBD04	1.04
The Reyes brothers try to get answers from a tied up Happy, but he refuses to speak until they threaten his dog, Opie. He explains the hit was for both their parents and that the order came from Mexico. He promises to get more information from his contact and that they will be even. Dita reveals to Felipe that Miguel is his son. While the club, without the Reyes brothers, rides home, the Swole Boys try to get revenge for Angel and EZ's actions and throw Riz off his bike. Riz shoots a Swole Boy's leg in revenge and a furious Bishop wants to know what the Reyes brothers did. At the border, Adelita is tracked down by Potter's mercenaries and stages a situation to make it look like the Galindo cartel had found her and handed her over. Emily finds an old photo of Jose and Dita with Felipe.
15	5	"Xquic"	Rachel Goldberg	Debra Moore Munoz	October 1, 2019	2WBD05	1.00
EZ and Angel return to Santo Padre, where Bishop is pissed about the situation with the Swole Boys. The mercenaries hand Adelita to Potter, who suspects Galindo's actions. He reveals to Adelita that they will use her child against her. Potter asks Galindo's help with moving Adelita but, on the side, Galindo and the Mayans plan on rescuing her. When threatened to be left out the operation, Angel reveals Adelita's baby is his. Despite Potter's use of decoys, the Mayans manage to rescue Adelita but she refuses to leave, saying that if Potter has her he'd leave everyone else alone. Meanwhile, Emily checks the Galindo's family records on storage and discovers more information about Felipe and Dita's past. She visits Felipe, who tells her to leave it alone because the truth would only hurt those she loves.
16	6	"Muluc"	Guy Ferland	Andrea Ciannavei	October 8, 2019	2WBD06	1.03
Adelita has been transferred to a naval base in San Diego. Potter's mercenaries kidnap Alvarez. Nestor follows them, but he is run off the road. Happy comes to the Reyes brothers with more info about the hit on their parents. He also agrees to help the Mayans rescue Alvarez, who tricks the mercenaries into sending coded messages to Bishop and Galindo that allow them to locate him. The Mayans and Galindo rescue Alvarez. All mercenaries are killed, with Alvarez himself beating their leader to death. Meanwhile, Ileana calls Emily and tells her a competitor has a better proposal, leading her to work out Ileana's assistant Marlon is the leak. After Miguel blows her off because he's dealing with Alvarez's kidnapping, Emily asks EZ for help with Marlon. EZ goes to visit him, but Marlon has a gun. They fight and Marlon accidentally shoots himself. Potter asks his second to investigate Ignacio/Felipe.
17	7	"Tohil"	Peter Weller	Jenny Lynn	October 15, 2019	2WBD07	1.10
Angel reconnects with his father and tells him about his relationship with Adelita and that he will soon be a dad. Coco and Leticia have breakfast when he meets her friend, Gabriella, an immigrant whose mother and brother along with other immigrants, are being held by a Mexican biker gang "Vatos Malditos" who have invaded Mayan territory. Emily and Miguel find out they won the Agra bid but the circumstances around how they won worry Miguel, he asks Nestor to keep an eye on Emily who is trying to get in contact with EZ about what happened to Marlon. The Mayans attack Vatos Malditos, and free the immigrants that were trapped reuniting Gabriella with her family. Emily meets with EZ and he explains what happened that night with Marlon, Emily says she is in EZ's debt and he then takes out the paperwork Happy gave him regarding the murder of his mother asking for her help.
18	8	"Kukulkan"	Allison Anders	Sean Tretta	October 22, 2019	2WBD08	1.01
The Mayans meet with SAMCRO president Filip "Chibs" Telford, along with other members of SAMCRO, and another M.C. that are currently engaged in a dispute with the Mayans. The Mayans and the other club have a dispute over guns. As per a wish made by Jax Teller before his death, the Sons have to end their trade with guns. After things gets messy, the rival M.C. leaves with no deal. After the Sons leave El Padro, the rival M.C attack the Mayans, injuring Riz and temporarily blinding Coco in the process.
19	9	"Itzam-Ye"	Kevin Dowling	Kurt Sutter & Elgin James	October 29, 2019	2WBD09	1.05
Revenge or revenue? Bishop's men face a difficult dilemma. Felipe reveals to his sons some past cartel connections.
20	10	"Hunahpu"	Elgin James	Kurt Sutter	November 5, 2019	2WBD10	0.95
Forgiving foes is tough for any Mayans man, let alone EZ and Angel, with personal scores to settle and sins to be punished.

== Reception ==
=== Critical response ===
The second season received positive reviews from critics. On the review aggregation website Rotten Tomatoes, the season currently holds a perfect 100% approval rating with an average rating of 7.75 out of 10 based on 5 reviews.

=== Ratings ===
Viewership and ratings per episode of Mayans M.C. season 2
No.	Title	Air date	Rating (18–49)	Viewers (millions)	DVR (18–49)	DVR viewers (millions)	Total (18–49)	Total viewers (millions)
1	"Xbalanque"	September 3, 2019	0.5	1.39	0.6	1.42	1.1	2.80 (Note: Live +7 ratings were not available, so Live +3 ratings have been used instead.)
2	"Xaman-Ek"	September 10, 2019	0.4	1.06	0.5	1.26	0.9	2.32
3	"Camazotz"	September 17, 2019	0.4	1.12	0.5	1.35	0.9	2.47
4	"Lahun Chan"	September 24, 2019	0.4	1.04	0.6	1.53	1.0	2.57
5	"Xquic"	October 1, 2019	0.4	1.00	0.6	1.57	1.0	2.57
6	"Muluc"	October 8, 2019	0.4	1.03	0.6	1.55	1.0	2.58
7	"Tohil"	October 15, 2019	0.4	1.10	0.7	1.72	1.1	2.83
8	"Kukulkan"	October 22, 2019	0.4	1.01	0.6	1.67	1.0	2.69
9	"Itzam-Ye"	October 29, 2019	0.4	1.05	0.6	1.78	1.0	2.83
10	"Hunahpu"	November 5, 2019	0.3	0.95	0.7	1.73	1.0	2.68
