= List of Sons of Anarchy and Mayans M.C. characters =

The following is a list of characters from Sons of Anarchy, and its spin-off Mayans M.C. Both are American crime drama television series. Sons of Anarchy was created by Kurt Sutter, and Sutter also created Mayans MC with Elgin James. Sons of Anarchy aired from 2008 to 2014, Mayans M.C. from 2018 to 2023.

== Cast ==
= Main cast (credited)
= Recurring cast (3+)
= Guest cast (1–2)

=== Main cast ===
Character	Actor	Sons of Anarchy							Mayans M.C.				
Character	Actor	1	2	3	4	5	6	7	1	2	3	4	5
Jackson 'Jax' Teller	Charlie Hunnam	Main	Main	Main	Main	Main	Main	Main					
Gemma Teller-Morrow	Katey Sagal	Main	Main	Main	Main	Main	Main	Main	Guest				
Robert 'Bobby Elvis' Munson	Mark Boone Junior	Main	Main	Main	Main	Main	Main	Main					
Alex 'Tig' Trager	Kim Coates	Main	Main	Main	Main	Main	Main	Main				Guest	
Filip 'Chibs' Telford	Tommy Flanagan	Main	Main	Main	Main	Main	Main	Main		Guest			
Kip 'Half-Sack' Epps	Johnny Lewis	Main	Main										
Tara Knowles	Maggie Siff	Main	Main	Main	Main	Main	Main						
Clarence 'Clay' Morrow	Ron Perlman	Main	Main	Main	Main	Main	Main						
Harry 'Opie' Winston	Ryan Hurst	Recurring	Main	Main	Main	Main							
Piermont 'Piney' Winston	William Lucking	Recurring	Main	Main	Main								
Juan-Carlos 'Juice' Ortiz	Theo Rossi	Recurring	Main	Main	Main	Main	Main	Main					
Wayne Unser	Dayton Callie	Recurring	Recurring	Main	Main	Main	Main	Main					
Neron 'Nero' Padilla	Jimmy Smits					Recurring	Starring	Starring					
Wendy Case	Drea de Matteo	Recurring			Guest	Recurring	Recurring	Main					Guest
Happy	David Labrava	Recurring	Recurring	Recurring	Recurring	Recurring	Recurring	Main	Guest	Recurring	Guest		Guest
George 'Ratboy' Skogstrom	Niko Nicotera				Recurring	Recurring	Recurring	Main					
Ezekiel 'E.Z.' Reyes	J. D. Pardo								Main	Main	Main	Main	Main
Angel Reyes	Clayton Cardenas								Main	Main	Main	Main	Main
Emily Thomas	Sarah Bolger								Main	Main	Main	Main	Main
Obispo 'Bishop' Losa	Michael Irby								Main	Main	Main	Main	Main
Adelita	Carla Baratta								Main	Main	Main	Main	Main
Johnny 'El Coco' Cruz	Richard Cabral								Main	Main	Main	Main	
Che 'Taza' Romero	Raoul Trujillo								Main	Main	Main	Main	Guest
Michael 'Riz' Ariza	Antonio Jaramillo								Main	Main			
Miguel Galindo	Danny Pino								Main	Main	Main	Main	Main
Felipe Reyes	Edward James Olmos								Main	Main	Main	Main	Main
Marcus Alvarez	Emilio Rivera	Recurring	Recurring	Recurring	Recurring	Guest	Guest	Recurring	Recurring	Main	Main	Main	Main
Gabriela 'Gaby' Castillo	Sulem Calderon									Guest	Main	Guest	
Hank 'El Tranq' Loza	Frankie Loyal								Recurring	Recurring	Recurring	Main	Main
Neron 'Creeper' Vargas	Joseph Raymond Lucero								Recurring	Recurring	Recurring	Main	Main
Gilberto 'Gilly' Lopez	Vincent "Rocco" Vargas								Recurring	Recurring	Recurring	Main	Main
Isaac Packer	JR Bourne										Recurring	Guest	Main

=== Recurring cast ===
Character	Actor	Sons of Anarchy							Mayans M.C.				
Character	Actor	1	2	3	4	5	6	7	1	2	3	4	5
Abel Teller	Tyler Silva / Ryder Londo / Evan Londo	Recurring	Recurring	Recurring	Recurring	Guest	Recurring	Recurring					
Ernest Darby	Mitch Pileggi	Recurring	Recurring	Recurring			Guest						
June Stahl	Ally Walker	Recurring	Recurring	Recurring									
Cameron Hayes	Jamie McShane	Recurring	Recurring	Recurring									
Estevez	Marcos de la Cruz	Recurring	Recurring	Recurring									
Laroy Wayne	Tory Kittles	Recurring	Recurring	Guest	Recurring								
David Hale	Taylor Sheridan	Recurring	Recurring	Guest									
Luann Delaney	Dendrie Taylor	Recurring	Recurring										
Mary Winston	Julie Ariola	Recurring	Recurring										
John 'J.T.' Teller	Nicholas Guest (voice)	Recurring	Guest	Recurring	Guest								
Floyd	James Carraway	Recurring	Guest	Guest	Guest								
Vic Trammel	Glenn Plummer	Recurring	Guest										
Rita 'Cherry' Zambell	Taryn Manning	Recurring		Recurring									
Donna Winston	Sprague Grayden	Recurring											
Joshua Kohn	Jay Karnes	Recurring											
Lowell Harland Jr.	Keir O'Donnell	Recurring											
Agent Smith	Derwin Jordan	Recurring											
Eviqua Michaels	Ashley Monique Clark	Recurring											
Officer Fain	Pablo Espinosa	Recurring											
Chucky Marstein	Michael Ornstein	Guest	Recurring	Recurring	Recurring	Recurring	Recurring	Recurring	Recurring	Recurring			
Lyla Winston	Winter Ave Zoli		Recurring	Recurring	Recurring	Recurring	Recurring	Recurring					
Margaret Murphy	McNally Sagal		Recurring	Recurring	Recurring	Recurring	Recurring						
Ima Tite	Kristen Renton		Recurring	Recurring	Recurring	Guest	Guest						
Elliott Oswald	Patrick St. Esprit	Guest	Recurring	Recurring	Recurring		Guest						
Candy Eglee	Marya Delver	Guest	Recurring	Recurring			Recurring	Recurring					
James 'Jimmy O' O'Phelan	Titus Welliver		Recurring	Recurring									
Luke Moran	Kevin P. Kearns		Recurring	Recurring									
Fiona Larkin	Bellina Logan		Recurring	Recurring									
Otto 'Big Otto' Delaney	Kurt Sutter	Guest	Recurring	Guest	Recurring	Recurring	Guest						
Gill	E.R. Ruiz	Guest	Recurring	Guest	Guest								
Henry Lin	Kenneth Choi	Guest	Recurring	Guest		Recurring	Guest	Recurring					
Ethan Zobelle	Adam Arkin		Recurring										
A.J. Weston	Henry Rollins		Recurring										
Edmond Hayes	Callard Harris		Recurring										
Polly Zobelle	Sarah Jones		Recurring										
Neeta	Cleo King		Recurring										
Ule	Jason Matthew Smith		Recurring										
Duke Weston	Trenton Rogers		Recurring										
Philip 'Filthy Phil' Russell	Chris Reed			Recurring	Recurring	Recurring	Recurring						
Jacob Hale Jr.	Jeff Kober		Guest	Recurring	Recurring	Recurring	Guest						
Herman Kozik	Kenny Johnson		Guest	Recurring	Recurring								
Eric Miles	Frank Potter			Recurring	Recurring								
Liam O'Neill	Arie Verveen			Recurring	Guest								
Ally Lowen	Robin Weigert			Recurring		Recurring	Recurring						
Taddarius Orwell 'T.O.' Cross	Michael Beach			Recurring		Guest		Recurring					
Nate Madock	Hal Holbrook			Recurring				Guest					
Maureen Ashby	Paula Malcolmson			Recurring									
Trinity Ashby	Zoe Boyle			Recurring									
Kellan Ashby	James Cosmo			Recurring									
Keith McGee	Andrew McPhee			Recurring									
Hector Salazar	Jose Pablo Cantillo			Recurring									
Luisa	Tara Macken			Recurring									
Amy Tyler	Pamela J. Gray			Recurring									
Lander Jackson	Marcello Thedford			Recurring									
Donny	Joel Tobeck			Recurring									
Seamus Ryan	Darin Heames			Recurring									
Sean Casey	Dan Hildebrand			Recurring									
Michael Casey	Glenn Keogh			Recurring									
Kerrianne Larkin-Telford	Q'orianka Kilcher			Recurring									
Amelia Dominguez	Monique Gabriela Curnen			Recurring									
'Lumpy' Feldstein	Michael Fairman			Recurring									
'Pozo'	Chad Guerrero			Recurring									
Deputy Sheriff Cane	LaMonica Garrett				Recurring	Recurring	Recurring	Guest					
Eli Roosevelt	Rockmond Dunbar				Recurring	Recurring	Recurring						
Chris 'V-Lin' Von Lin	Walter Wong				Recurring	Recurring	Guest						
Romero 'Romeo' Parada	Danny Trejo				Recurring	Recurring							
Luis Torres	Benito Martinez				Recurring	Recurring							
Galen O'Shay	Timothy V. Murphy				Recurring	Guest	Recurring						
Rita Roosevelt	Merle Dandridge				Recurring	Guest							
Brendan Roarke	Bob McCracken			Guest	Recurring		Guest	Guest					
Lincoln 'Linc' Potter	Ray McKinnon				Recurring				Recurring	Recurring	Guest	Guest	Recurring
Grad Nicholas	David Rees Snell				Recurring								
'Rafi'	Jesse Garcia				Recurring								
August Marks	Billy Brown					Recurring	Recurring	Recurring					
'Fiasco'	Rey Gallegos					Recurring	Recurring	Guest					
Lee Toric	Donal Logue					Recurring	Recurring						
Tyler Yost	Mo McRae					Recurring	Guest	Recurring					
Damon Pope	Harold Perrineau					Recurring							
Frankie 'Diamonds'	Chuck Zito					Recurring							
'Go-Go'	Chris Browning					Recurring							
Greg 'The Peg'	Kurt Yaeger					Recurring							
Carla	Wanda de Jesus					Recurring							
Rane Quinn	Rusty Coones					Guest	Recurring	Recurring	Guest	Guest			Guest
Alessandro 'Domingo' Montez	Jacob Vargas						Recurring	Recurring		Guest	Recurring		
Charlie Barosky	Peter Weller						Recurring	Recurring					
Connor Malone	Scott Anderson						Recurring	Recurring					
Sheriff Carreira	Josh Nasar						Recurring	Recurring					
Tyne Patterson	CCH Pounder						Recurring	Guest					
Colette Jane	Kim Dickens						Recurring	Guest					
Orlin West	Douglas Bennett						Recurring	Guest					
Hugh	Alan O'Neill						Recurring	Guest					
Hopper	Steve Howey						Recurring						
Gomes	Mario Perez						Recurring						
Neil	Kevin Fry						Recurring						
Oscar 'El Oso' Ramos	Ivo Nandi							Recurring		Recurring	Guest		
'Jury' White	Michael Shamus Wiles	Guest					Guest	Recurring					
Venus Van Dam	Walton Goggins					Guest	Guest	Recurring					
Brooke Putner	Hayley McFarland						Guest	Recurring					
Althea Jarry	Annabeth Gish							Recurring					
Ron Tully	Marilyn Manson							Recurring					
'Sticky'	Malcolm-Jamal Warner							Recurring					
Ryu Tom	Ron Yuan							Recurring					
Leland Gruen	Brad Carter							Recurring					
Pastor Jonathan Haddem	Marc Lear							Recurring					
Loutreesha Haddem	April Grace							Recurring					
Grant McQueen	Arjay Smith							Recurring					
Moses Cartwright	Mathew St. Patrick							Recurring					
Ms. Harrison	Courtney Love							Recurring					
Gaines	Tony Curran							Recurring					
Nestor Oceteva	Gino Vento								Recurring	Recurring	Recurring	Recurring	Recurring
Mini	Melony Ochoa								Recurring	Recurring	Recurring		Guest
Antonia Pena	Alexandra Barreto								Recurring	Recurring	Recurring		
Maria	Monica Estrada								Recurring	Recurring	Guest		Recurring
Dita Galindo	Ada Maris								Recurring	Recurring	Guest		
Pablo	Salvador Chacon								Recurring	Recurring	Guest		
Paco	Joe Ordaz								Recurring	Recurring	Guest		
Leticia Cruz	Emily Tosta								Recurring	Guest	Recurring	Recurring	Recurring
Franky Rogan	Edwin Hodge								Recurring	Guest	Guest		
Celia	Ada Luz Pla								Recurring		Guest		
Kevin Jimenez	Maurice Compte								Recurring				
Devante Cano	Tony Plana								Recurring				
Bowen	Curtiss I' Cook								Recurring				
Santiago Martin Heimler	Alexander Bedria								Recurring				
Father Rodrigo	Daniel Faraldo								Recurring				
Andres	Diego Olmedo								Recurring				
Hope	Vanessa Giselle									Recurring	Recurring	Recurring	Recurring
Canche	Jimmy Gonzales									Recurring	Recurring	Recurring	
Anna Linares	Efrat Dor									Recurring	Recurring	Guest	
Sederica Palomo	Mía Maestro									Recurring	Recurring		
Dondo	Emiliano Torres									Recurring	Guest	Recurring	
Marisol	Yvonne Valadez									Recurring	Guest		
Ganso	Bryan Rubio									Recurring	Guest		
Hallorann	Ray Nicholson								Guest	Recurring			
Hobart	Mikal Vega									Recurring			
Ileana	Malaya Rivera Drew									Recurring			
Weston	Nate Boyer									Recurring			
Norton	Trenton Rostedt									Recurring			
Medina	Celestino Cornielle									Recurring			
Marlon Buksar	David Clayton Rogers									Recurring			
Diana Alvarez	Michelle Diaz (Note: In Sons of Anarchy)/Patricia De Leon (Note: In Mayans M.C.)			Guest							Recurring	Recurring	Recurring
Luis	Michael Anthony Perez									Guest	Recurring	Recurring	Recurring
'Lobo'	Loki									Guest	Recurring	Recurring	Recurring
Sirena	Christian Vera										Recurring	Recurring	Recurring
Jess	Grace Rizzo										Recurring	Recurring	Recurring
Cielo	Mia Danelle										Recurring	Recurring	Recurring
Cristóbal Galindo	Judah Benjamin/Obadiah Abel										Recurring	Recurring	Recurring
Otero	Hector Verdugo										Recurring	Recurring	Recurring
Santiago	Zachary Gallegos										Recurring	Recurring	Recurring
'Nails'	Justina Adorno										Recurring	Recurring	Guest
'El Banquero'	Guillermo Garcia										Recurring	Recurring	
Jameson	Anton Narinskiy										Recurring	Guest	Recurring
Erin Thomas	Holland Roden										Recurring	Guest	
Sahuarita President	Wilson Ramirez									Guest	Recurring		Recurring
'Echo'	Shaina Mikee Keiths										Recurring		Recurring
'Butterfly'	Spencer Granese										Recurring		Guest
Celeste	Marcie Robledo										Recurring		Guest
Vicki	Elpidia Carrillo								Guest	Guest	Recurring		
Pavia	Roel Navarro									Guest	Recurring		
Ibarra	Mike Beltran									Guest	Recurring		
'El Palo'	Gregory Cruz									Guest	Recurring		
Steve	Momo Rodriguez										Recurring		
Alicia	Denise G. Sanchez										Recurring		
Florence	Karen Strassman										Recurring		
Laura	Natalia Cordova-Buckley										Recurring		
Gaby's Uncle	Octavio Solorio										Recurring		
Treenie	Augie Duke										Guest	Recurring	Recurring
Tessa Alvarez	Lillianna Valenzuela										Guest	Recurring	Recurring
Terry	Greg Vrotsos										Guest	Recurring	Recurring
Kody	Stella Maeve											Recurring	Recurring
Downer	Angel Oquendo											Recurring	Recurring
Sofia	Andrea Cortés											Recurring	Recurring
Maverick	Maverick James											Recurring	Recurring
Soledad	Selene Luna											Recurring	Recurring
Hoosier	Strand of Oaks											Recurring	Recurring
Rae	Erica Luttrell											Recurring	Recurring
Jacob	Carter Young											Recurring	Recurring
Joker	Dakota Daulby											Recurring	Recurring
Sister Anne	Whitney Ortega											Recurring	Recurring
Smoky	Aaron Abeyta										Guest	Recurring	Guest
Hector	Justin Huen											Recurring	Guest
Shadow	Katie Ellis											Recurring	Guest
Sasha	Julia Belanova											Recurring	Guest
Kyle	Rowan Smyth											Recurring	Guest
Andy	Coco Lloyd											Recurring	Guest
Jazmine	Zhaleh Vossough											Recurring	Guest
Berdoo	Star Fields								Guest	Guest		Recurring	
Manny	Manny Montana											Recurring	
Doc	Bruce Robert Cole											Recurring	
Jay-Jay	Greg Serano											Recurring	
Tex	Julio Cesar Ruiz											Recurring	
Sister Teresa	Renee Victor											Recurring	
Cole	Branton Box								Guest				Recurring
Diaz	Alex Fernandez										Guest	Guest	Recurring
Rooster	Fabian Alomar										Guest	Guest	Recurring
Consuela Losa	Christine Avila										Guest		Recurring
Maggie	Presciliana Esparolini											Guest	Recurring
Bottles	Alex Barone												Recurring
Guero	Andrew Jacobs												Recurring
Chip	Lauren McKnight												Recurring
Paloma	Megan Renée Williams												Recurring
Patricia Devlin	Dana Delany												Recurring
Elio	Luis Fernandez-Gil												Recurring
Kit	Noite												Recurring
Lefty	Cortni Vaughn Joyner												Recurring
Johnny Panic	Caitlin Stasey												Recurring
Sosa	Herbert Morales												Recurring
Stone	Michael Olavson												Recurring
Kira	Jolene Van Vugt												Recurring
Mrs. Buksar	Kathleen Quinlan												Recurring
Poppy Foreman	Oscar Balderrama												Recurring
Ari	Alison Elliott												Recurring

=== Guest cast ===
Character	Actor	Sons of Anarchy							Mayans M.C.				
Character	Actor	1	2	3	4	5	6	7	1	2	3	4	5
Homeless Woman	Olivia Burnette	Guest	Guest	Guest	Guest	Guest	Guest	Guest					
Rosen	Tom Everett Scott	Special Guest	Special Guest										
Tristen Oswald	Liana Liberato	Guest	Guest										
Officer Craft	Adrian LaTourelle	Guest	Guest										
Skeeter	Bob Rusch	Guest			Guest	Guest							
Jimmy Cacuzza	Jeff Wincott	Guest				Guest	Guest						
Kyle Hobart	Brian Van Holt	Special Guest											
Georgie Caruso	Tom Arnold		Guest		Guest								
Bachman	Stephen King		Special Guest										
Lenny "The Pimp"	Sonny Barger			Special Guest	Special Guest	Special Guest							
Declan Brogan	Bart McCarthy			Guest	Guest		Guest						
Victor Putlova	Keith Szarabajka			Guest	Guest								
Sergio Coletti	Jeffrey R. Newman			Guest				Guest					
Dawn Trager	Rachel Miner				Guest	Guest							
Dr. Balian	Matt Orduña				Guest	Guest							
Vivica	Marianne Jean-Baptiste				Special Guest								
Dondo	David Hasselhoff				Special Guest								
Lucius Padilla	Gybby Eusebio					Guest	Guest	Guest					
Arcadio Nerona	Dave Navarro					Guest	Guest						
Pamela Toric	Karina Logue					Guest							
Les Packer	Robert Patrick						Special Guest	Special Guest	Special Guest	Special Guest			
Milo	Michael Chiklis							Special Guest					
Louie	Noel G.								Guest	Guest	Guest	Guest	Guest
Nico Diehl	Mark D. Espinoza								Guest	Guest			
O'Grady	John Pirruccello									Guest	Guest		
Paul	Phil Brooks											Guest	Guest
Melissa Lyndecker	Carla Gallo											Guest	Guest

== Lead characters ==
=== Jax Teller ===
Jackson Nathaniel 'Jax' Teller (Charlie Hunnam), is a member of the titular motorcycle club and the main protagonist of the series. He spends the majority of the show's lifespan as the vice president of the Sons of Anarchy Motorcycle Club's Redwood Original (SAMCRO) mother charter based in Charming, California; following season four, he assumes the presidency for the remainder of the series.

=== Ezekiel Reyes ===
Ezekiel 'E.Z.' Reyes (J. D. Pardo) is the protagonist on the FX television series Mayans M.C.. A member of the titular motorcycle club, he is a Prospect for the majority of the first two seasons of the series. The brother of club member Angel Reyes, E.Z. becomes a full patch member by the end of the second season, and later gets promoted to vice-president and then President. E.Z. also has an eidetic memory, and can vividly remember childhood memories. Pardo had to go through a transformation for the role, including gaining muscle.

== Main characters ==
=== Sons of Anarchy ===
==== Gemma Teller-Morrow ====
Gemma Teller-Morrow (Katey Sagal) is a native of Charming and the widow of deceased SAMCRO founder John Teller, mother of Jax Teller, and wife of Clay Morrow. Gemma is a Machiavellian schemer and expert in psychological manipulation. She holds significant power within the culture of the MC - far beyond that of the average "old lady". After ending her marriage to Clay in season 5, Gemma develops a relationship with Nero Padilla and also finds herself at odds with Jax and Tara Knowles over how to raise their sons, Abel and Thomas. This culminates in Gemma murdering Tara in season 6, and her lie in an attempt to cover it up causes Jax to seek revenge, sparking a gang war. Jax eventually learns the truth and kills Gemma before committing suicide.

==== Bobby Munson ====
Robert "Bobby" Munson
- Sons of Anarchy character
- Mark Boone Junior as Bobby Munson
- First appearance: "Pilot" (2008)
- Last appearance: "What a Piece of Work Is Man" (2014)
- Created by: Kurt Sutter
- Portrayed by: Mark Boone Junior

In-universe information
- Nicknames: Elvis; Bobby Elvis; Fat Elvis
- Titles: Secretary (season 1-4); Vice President (season 4-5)
- Affiliation: Sons of Anarchy Motorcycle Club
- Spouse: Precious Ryan (ex-wife)
- Children: Robert "Tiki" Munson (son)
- Nationality: American

Robert "Bobby" Munson (Mark Boone Junior) is a member of SAMCRO and spends most of the series in the officer position of secretary, managing the club's finances. In season 5 he becomes vice president when Jax Teller takes over as president, but steps down shortly after due to leadership disagreements. Bobby is intelligent and even-tempered, but uses violence when necessary. Bobby is a Jewish-American whose father was an accountant in Reno, Nevada, having kept books for the Mafia. He spent 10 years in the U.S. Army Reserve and completed 2 years of community college. Like most of SAMCRO, Bobby works as a mechanic at Teller-Morrow Automotive. He plays guitar, and does Elvis Presley impersonations as a side job; he is sometimes referred to as "Bobby Elvis". Bobby originally joined the Sons in their nomad charter before patching into SAMCRO. In season 6, he temporarily leaves SAMCRO to secretly recruit from that Nomad charter. In season 7, Bobby is murdered by August Marks during SAMCRO's conflict with the crime kingpin.

==== Tig Trager ====
Alexander "Tig" Trager
- Sons of Anarchy / Mayans M.C. character
- First appearance: "Pilot" (2008) (Sons of Anarchy)
- Created by: Kurt Sutter
- Portrayed by: Kim Coates

In-universe information
- Nicknames: Tiggy; Tigger
- Titles: Sergeant-at-Arms (season 1-4); Vice President (season 7, Mayans M.C.
- Affiliation: Sons of Anarchy Motorcycle Club
- Significant other: Venus Van Dam (girlfriend)
- Children: Dawn Trager (deceased); Fawn Trager
- Nationality: American

Alexander "Tig" Trager (Kim Coates) is a member of SAMCRO, spending the first four seasons as the club's sergeant-at-arms and Clay Morrow's loyal enforcer. Quick to violence, Tig is fiercely loyal to the club and has no qualms about killing for it. Prior to joining the Sons, Tig served in the United States Marine Corps. Like most of SAMCRO, he works as a mechanic at Teller-Morrow Automotive. He has two daughters, Dawn and Fawn. He suffers from acute pediophobia, a fear of dolls, which Sons of Anarchy creator Kurt Sutter actually has. Tig is a necrophiliac, and is hinted to have a proclivity for other paraphilias. A dog lover, he holds an open grudge against Herman Kozic over ownership of a German Shepherd. During the series he rescues and adopts an American Pit Bull Terrier from a dog fighting ring. Tig steps down as sergeant-at-arms in season 4 after learning of Clay's antagonistic schemes and guilt over his own violent actions, notably when he mistakenly murdered Donna Winston in a botched assassination attempt on Opie. In season 4, Tig accidentally kills the daughter of crime kingpin Damon Pope, resulting in the murder of his daughter Dawn, and inadvertently Opie's as well. After being saved from Pope by Jax, he becomes fiercely loyal to him. During the final two seasons, Tig develops a sexual and later romantic relationship with Venus Van Dam, a transgender prostitute. When Jax is excommunicated from the club during the final episode of the series, newly appointed president Chibs Telford selects Tig to be the vice president. Tig later appears in the spin-off series Mayans M.C., still holding the vice president rank in SAMCRO.

==== Chibs Telford ====
Filip Telford
- Sons of Anarchy / Mayans M.C. character
- First appearance: "Pilot" (2008) (Sons of Anarchy)
- Last appearance: "Kukulkan" (2019) (Mayans M.C.)
- Created by: Kurt Sutter
- Portrayed by: Tommy Flanagan

In-universe information
- Nicknames: Chibs; Chibby; The Scot; Scotty
- Titles: Sergeant-at-Arms (season 5-6); Vice President (season 6-7); President (season 7, Mayans M.C.)
- Affiliation: Sons of Anarchy Motorcycle Club
- Family: Padraic Telford (nephew)
- Spouse: Fiona Larkin (estranged)
- Children: Kerrianne Larkin-Telford
- Origin: Glasgow, Scotland, UK
- Nationality: American (formerly Scottish)

Filip "Chibs" Telford (Tommy Flanagan), is a member of SAMCRO who was born in Glasgow, Scotland but grew up in Belfast, Northern Ireland. He served in the British Army as a combat medic for 5 months but was court martialed. He was a member of the Real IRA but was excommunicated by Jimmy O'Phelan, who gave Chibs a Glasgow smile and stole his wife, Fiona, and daughter Kerrianne. Chibs joined the MC's Belfast charter, SAMBEL, before moving to the United States and joining SAMCRO. He is SAMCRO's connection to the IRA gun trade. Like most of SAMCRO, Chibs works as a mechanic at Teller-Morrow. Fiercely loyal to Jax, Chibs serves as his sergeant-at-arms in seasons 5 and 6, and as vice president for the remainder of the series. When Jax is excommunicated from the club during the final episode of the series, he selects Chibs to succeed him as president. Chibs later appears in the spin-off series Mayans M.C. as president of SAMCRO.

==== Edward Epps ====
Edward Epps
- Sons of Anarchy character
- First appearance: "Pilot" (2008)
- Last appearance: "Na Trioblóidí" (2009)
- Created by: Kurt Sutter
- Portrayed by: Johnny Lewis

In-universe information
- Nicknames: Half-Sack; Sack; Kippy
- Affiliation: Sons of Anarchy Motorcycle Club
- Significant others: Cherry
- Nationality: American

Edward Kip "Half-Sack" Epps, (Johnny Lewis) is a SAMCRO prospect who lost his right testicle while serving in the U.S. Army during the Iraq War. He is tasked with doing menial jobs that members don't want to do. He is brave and obedient, quickly earning Jax's trust. A former junior lightweight champion of the armed forces boxing competition, SAMCRO earns money from bets on Half-Sack's fights. Like most of SAMCRO, he works as a mechanic at Teller-Morrow. He is a vegetarian. Half-Sack develops a romantic relationship with Cherry, an MC "sweet butt", until she is forced to move to Belfast to avoid federal law enforcement. When SAMCRO comes into conflict with rogue IRA members, Half-Sack is stabbed to death by Cameron Hayes while protecting Jax's infant son, Abel. In season 3, Half-Sack is posthumously made a full member of SAMCRO.

==== Tara Knowles ====
Tara Knowles-Teller (Maggie Siff) is Jax's high school sweetheart. A pediatric surgeon, she returns to Charming shortly before the events of the series. Her obsessive ex-boyfriend, ATF agent Josh Kohn, stalks her in season 1, resulting in Jax killing him. Tara and Jax's romantic relationship is a central part of the series; she raises Jax's son Abel as her own, gives birth to their son Thomas, and in season 5 marries him. However, the growing violence causes her loyalty to vanish, and in season 6 she intends to divorce Jax and gain full custody of Abel and Thomas. This culminates in Gemma murdering Tara, falsely believing she ratted on Jax and SAMCRO.

==== Clay Morrow ====
Clarence 'Clay' Morrow (Ron Perlman) is a member of SAMCRO and one of the original club founders. He served as a U.S. Army paratrooper during the Vietnam War. Clay serves as president from season 1 until stripped of his position at the end of season 4. He is the husband of Gemma and step-father to Jax. Clay led SAMCRO with an iron fist for over a decade, however his antagonistic actions throughout the series result in significant harm being done to the club, its members and their family, and Charming itself. After Jax learns that Clay was responsible for the death of his father, John Teller, the death of Piney Winston, and an attack on Tara, he forcefully strips Clay of the presidency. SAMCRO later votes to excommunicate Clay from the club, and in season 6 they orchestrate the assassination of Clay and his rogue IRA allies.

==== Opie Winston ====
Harry "Opie" Winston (Ryan Hurst) is a member of SAMCRO and son of co-founder Piney. He is the lifelong best friend of Jax. In 2003, Opie is sent to prison for 5 years leaving his wife Donna, and their kids, Ellie and Kenny, alone. Upon his release just prior to season 1, Opie's family struggles financially, and Opie's decision to resume illegal activity with SAMCRO, against Donna's wishes, ends in disaster after Donna is unintentionally murdered by Tig. Opie immerses himself back into SAMCRO and in season 3 forms a relationship with a porn star named Lyla, who he ultimately marries in season 4. After learning that Clay was responsible for Piney's death, Opie attempts to kill him but Jax prevents him. In season 5, Opie purposely gets himself arrested to protect Jax, and sacrifices himself when Damon Pope wants one of the Sons dead.

==== Piney Winston ====
Piermont "Piney" Winston
- Sons of Anarchy character
- First appearance: "Pilot" (2008)
- Last appearance: "Burnt and Purged Away" (2011)
- Created by: Kurt Sutter
- Portrayed by: William Lucking

In-universe information
- Nicknames: Piney; Pine
- Title(s): First 9 Vice President of the Sons of Anarchy Motorcycle Club, Charming, California (1967–early 2000s)
- Occupation: Founding member of the Sons of Anarchy Motorcycle Club, mechanic and Army Veteran.
- Family: Ellie Winston (granddaughter); Kenny Winston (grandson); Donna Winston (daughter-in-law); Lyla Winston (daughter-in-law); Piper (stepgrandson)
- Spouses: Mary Winston (ex-wife)
- Children: Harry "Opie" Winston
- Nationality: American

Piermont "Pine" Winston (William Lucking) co-founded SAMCRO, and was the club's first vice president. He is the father of Opie, as well as a Vietnam veteran, and must carry an oxygen tank due to emphysema. His patches have included: First 9, Redwood and Original.

Winston was in his late 60s and served as a soldier in the U.S. Army 25th Infantry Division during the Vietnam War. When he returned to his hometown of Charming, California, in 1967, he felt ostracized by the same society he had just risked his life for. He eventually co-founded the Sons of Anarchy Motorcycle Club with fellow war veteran John Teller as a form of social rebellion and freedom. He was JT's vice president until he was diagnosed with emphysema in 1991. He then suffered from severe emphysema and had to carry an oxygen tank with him at all times, which prevent his going out on runs, but he still attended "Church". Piney's emphysema is implied to have been caused by years of smoking, and he is often seen holding and smelling unlit cigarettes during sit-downs. Despite his age he proved to be just as tough as his younger club brothers. Piney is the father of Harry "Opie" Winston, Jax Teller's best friend and another member of the Sons of Anarchy. Piney was the only contemporary SAMCRO (Sons of Anarchy Motorcycle Club Redwood Original) member to wear the original Sons of Anarchy denim kutte. He is a heavy drinker, even more so than the other club members, with his preferred liquor being Patrón.

==== Juice Ortiz ====
Juice Ortiz
- Sons of Anarchy character
- First appearance: "Pilot" (2008)
- Last appearance: "Red Rose" (2014)
- Created by: Kurt Sutter
- Portrayed by: Theo Rossi

In-universe information
- Nickname: Juicy boy
- Occupation: Member of Sons of Anarchy Motorcycle Club, Marijuana Dispensary Co-Owner

Juan-Carlos "Juice" Ortiz (Theo Rossi) is SAMCRO's hacker and intelligence officer. Though Juice displays great technical prowess in some respects, he has also proven to be somewhat simple minded when it comes to other tasks, often garnering him hazing from the other members. His storyline grows after law enforcement see him as the club's weak link; in seasons 5–6 the Club becomes aware of his betrayals. On his colors, he wears the "Men of Mayhem" patch. He is one of three characters killed in the series' penultimate episode, "Red Rose," along with Wayne Unser and Gemma Teller Morrow.

Ortiz is of Puerto Rican and African-American descent, and is from Queens, New York. Ortiz's sponsor was Jax Teller (season 2). He was seen as unreliable by Clay Morrow, and is often given menial tasks, such as driving the transport truck. He sports a short mohawk and has matching tribal designs tattooed on each side of his head. According to Gemma Teller Morrow, Ortiz has a sister in Queens, although their relationship seems to be very distant.

He is a young and relatively new member of SAMCRO; he is close with Chibs Telford and Tig Trager, and it is suggested that he was sponsored by Jax as a prospect.

He develops depression and anxiety which results in a suicide attempt.

==== Wayne Unser ====
Wayne Unser
- Sons of Anarchy character
- First appearance: "Seeds" (2008)
- Last appearance: "Papa's Goods" (2014)
- Created by: Kurt Sutter
- Portrayed by: Dayton Callie

In-universe information
- Title: Consulting Investigator
- Occupation: Chief of the Charming Police Department, Marine, Associate of Sons of Anarchy M.C., San Joaquin Sheriffs Department Investigative unit.
- Spouse: Della Unser (divorced)
- Nationality: American

Chief Wayne Unser (Dayton Callie) is the chief of the Charming Police Department. He also owns Unser Shipping trucking company, and is not above using the SOA for protection and other questionable activities related to his business. He is an ally of Clay Morrow, as well as a USMC Veteran of the Vietnam War.

Despite serving as chief of police, Unser's ties to SAMCRO tighten over the course of the series. This is most evident when he helps the club to kill corrupt ATF Agent June Stahl and club nemesis Jimmy O'Phalen. Unser is ousted as Chief of Police when the city decides to let the county sheriffs take over policing duties. Unser eventually grows very close with the Teller family and SAMCRO, frequently intervening in problems to find acceptable solutions and helping prevent infighting among members. Unser ends up retiring, but due to the expenses of his cancer treatment is forced to sell his house and business, and moves into a trailer. Ever since, he is often seen helping the Teller family in many tasks. He also uses his connections to aid the club in avoiding law enforcement investigations and gang warfare.

Conflicting loyalties within the Teller family and the club eventually convince Unser to rejoin law enforcement as an ad hoc investigator for Lt. Althea Jarry of the San Joaquin County Sheriffs Department. Unser goes to these extreme measures in hopes of finally stopping all the bloodshed the club is causing and suffering from. In the penultimate episode of the series, Jax Teller kills Wayne while he is trying to arrest Gemma Teller-Morrow (to prevent her son Jax from killing her).

==== Wendy Case ====
Wendy Case
- First appearance: "Pilot" (2008) (Sons of Anarchy)
- Last appearance: "I Must Go in Now for the Fog is Rising" (2023) (Mayans M.C.)
- Created by: Kurt Sutter
- Portrayed by: Drea de Matteo

In-universe information
- Spouse: Jax Teller
- Children: Abel Teller

Wendy Case (Drea de Matteo) is Jax Teller's ex-wife and Abel Teller's biological mother. Shortly after Jax breaks up with her, she intentionally becomes pregnant in the hope that it would keep Jax with her. She was a meth addict during her pregnancy, which nearly killed Abel, who was born ten weeks premature with a hereditary heart malfunction and a tear in his abdominal wall.

Drea de Matteo is a supporting cast member for the majority of her time on the series. She was promoted to main cast billing for the seventh and last season.

==== Happy Lowman ====
Happy Lowman
- Sons of Anarchy / Mayans M.C. character
- First appearance: "Pilot" (2008) (Sons of Anarchy)
- Last appearance: "My Eyes Filled and Then Closed on the Last of Childhood Tears" (2023) (Mayans M.C.)
- Created by: Kurt Sutter
- Portrayed by: David Labrava

In-universe information
- Nicknames: Happy; Hap
- Title: Sergeant-at-Arms
- Occupation: Sergeant-at-Arms for SAMCRO Contract Killer

Happy "Hap" Lowman (David LaBrava) is SAMCRO's Sergeant-at-Arms beginning in season 6. His birth name is Happy which is based on Happy Loman from Arthur Miller's play Death of a Salesman. Lowman is played by real-life Hells Angel David Labrava. Happy Lowman portrays the enforcer as a member of the Sons of Anarchy Motorcycle Club along with being affiliated with the Tacoma, Washington SOA charter but later becomes a nomad (has no permanent charter). In the episode titled "The Push", Happy is patched in as an official member of the Sons of Anarchy Motorcycle Club- Redwood Original (SAMCRO) charter. He along with Tig Trager, are commonly used to carry out the club's dirty work. He is from Tacoma, Washington but frequently visits the club's charter in Charming, California where he has a good relationship with the President, Clay Morrow. Hap mentions that his mother is from Bakersfield, California. A heartless assassin, he has been shown to enjoy acts of violence that even other members of the club are disturbed by. Despite the toughness he regularly displays, he is depicted in the show at times as being emotional and not just when a club member dies. He has a Smiley (happy face) tattooed on him every time he kills someone.

Happy also appears in Mayans M.C., first in the first-season finale "Cuervo/Tz'ikb'uul", wherein it is revealed Happy killed Marisol Reyes, the mother of the series protagonist Ezekiel "EZ" Reyes and his brother Angel Reyes. EZ comes closer to cracking into Happy's involvement with killing operations for SAMCRO, including the murder of his own mother. EZ reveals the truth to his brother Angel about their mother's death and that he got information on the side about Happy, and his history with SAMCRO. Angel and EZ travel to Charming and break into Happy's house, holding him at gunpoint. The Reyes brothers try to get answers from a tied-up Happy, but he refuses to speak until they threaten his dog, Opie. He explains the hit was for both their parents and that the order came from Mexico. He promises to get more information from his contact and that they will be even. In the season five episode "My Eyes Filled and Then Closed on the Last of Childhood Tears", EZ and Angel find the whereabouts of Happy and kill him.

==== Ratboy Skogstrom ====
George "Ratboy" Skogstrom (Niko Nicotera) is originally introduced as a prospect during Season 4. He becomes a patched member and is often entrusted to look after Gemma and the other women.

==== Nero Padilla ====
Neron "Nero'" Padilla (Jimmy Smits) is a Mexican-American pimp (who refers to himself as a "companionator") and the head of a Mexican gang known as the Byz Lats. In the Season 5 premiere, he is shown to have bonded with Gemma Teller. In "Authority Vested", he provides sanctuary to the Sons, who hide out at his brothel, Diosa, when SAMCRO is under attack and planning their next move. Over the next few episodes, Nero allies with Jax Teller and offers mentorly advice, such as how to deal with Gemma (in "Toad's Wild Ride"). Nero has a young son who is disabled and lives in a home.

=== Mayans M.C. ===
Mayans M.C. takes place in the same fictional universe as Sons of Anarchy and deals with the Sons' rivals-turned-allies then rivals once again, the Mayans Motorcycle Club.

==== Angel Reyes ====
Angel Reyes (Clayton Cardenas), is EZ's brother and Él Secretario of the Mayans, Santo Padre Charter.

==== Emily Thomas ====
Emily Thomas (Sarah Bolger), is the childhood sweetheart of EZ, who is now married to Miguel Galindo, and the mother of their infant son.

==== Bishop Losa ====
Obispo 'Bishop' Losa (Michael Irby), is president of the Mayans Santo Padre Charter.

==== Adelita ====
Adelita (Carla Baratta), who as a child, watched her family die at the hands of the Galindo cartel.

==== Johnny Cruz ====
Johnny 'El Coco' Cruz (Richard Cabral) is a full patch member of Mayans M.C.

==== Gilberto Lopez ====
Gilberto 'Socratoshi' Lopez (Vincent “Rocco” Vargas), A former Mexican born U.S. Army Ranger, good-natured Mixed martial arts fighter, and a full patch member of Mayans M.C., Santo Padre Charter as well as WLR faction. Known as "The Black Hammer", Lopez carried out numerous missions regarding international drug cartel reconnaissance. Among those missions, he met his wife "Marie Hudson", who describes him as a "great father of our two wonderful children, Charles and Finn. He is outstanding in all aspects of life, love, fatherhood and desire to help us all".

==== Taza Romero ====
Che 'Taza' Romero (Raoul Trujillo), Vice Presidente of Mayans M.C., Santo Padre Charter.

==== Neron Vargas ====
Neron 'Creeper' Vargas (Joseph Lucero) a full patch member of Mayans M.C. and "Road Captain" of the Santo Padre Charter.

==== Riz Ariza ====
Michael 'Riz' Ariza (Antonio Jaramillo) is a full patch member of Mayans M.C.

==== Miguel Galindo ====
Miguel Galindo (Danny Pino) is the son of Galindo Cartel founder Jose Galindo, and is the illegitimate son of Felipe, making him a half-brother to Ezekiel and Angel Reyes.

==== Felipe Reyes ====
Felipe Reyes (Edward James Olmos) is the once-strong Mexican patriarch and Angel and EZ's father.

==== Marcus Álvarez ====
Marcus Álvarez
- Sons of Anarchy / Mayans M.C. character
- First appearance: "Pilot" (2008) (Sons of Anarchy)
- Created by: Kurt Sutter
- Portrayed by: Emilio Rivera

In-universe information
- Title(s): El Padrino (The Godfather); Consejero (advisor)
- Occupation: Outlaw motorcyclist Drug trafficker
- Affiliation: Mayans M.C.
- Family: Esai Álvarez (son); Tessa Álvarez (daughter); Obispo "Bishop" Losa (cousin)
- Nationality: Mexican-American

Marcus Álvarez (Emilio Rivera) is the president of the Mayans Motorcycle Club, an Oakland-based rival motorcycle club that has allied itself with the Nords in order to break SAMCRO's iron-fisted control over Charming. He and the Mayans are bitter rivals with the Niners gang.

Álvarez, who is of Mexican descent, seems to be the Mayans' national president. His son, Esai, was also a member of the club but had a hit placed on him by Marcus in 2008 as punishment for failing his mission. Most of his, and his gang's, income is made through dealing heroin and methamphetamine, and prostitution. For some time, he was a prisoner in Chino, but was released some time before the beginning of Season 1 of Sons of Anarchy. On his colors, he wears patches reading "Los Asesinos de Dios" (Spanish for "God's Assassins") and "Mayans Oakland". However, his "President" patch is later changed to "El Padrino" (which in English translates to "The Godfather"). He also has the Mayan Calendar tattooed on his chest.

Álvarez also appears in the spin-off Mayans M.C., now wearing an "El Padrino" patch, he goes down to Santo Padre Charter with members of the Mayans Motorcycle Club's Oakland, California charter to help the Santo Padre charter deal with the Galindo Cartel. It is revealed that he and José Galindo, the founder of the Cartel, had a mutual respect for one another. Álvarez later suspects that a mule in the Santo Padre charter is working with Los Olvidados ("The Forgotten Ones"). In the first-season finale, Álvarez steps down as Padrino to work with the Galindo Cartel directly as Miguel's newly appointed advisor.

==== Gabriela 'Gaby' Castillo ====
Gabriela 'Gaby' Castillo (Sulem Calderon) newly immigrated to the U.S. from Oaxaca, Mexico, she seeks to build a brighter future for herself and her family. After moving to Santo Padre, she starts a relationship with EZ until she leaves for Lodi to attend nursing school.

==== Leticia Cruz ====
Leticia Cruz (Emily Tosta) is Coco's daughter who was raised by her grandmother Celia for most of her life believing she was his younger sister.

==== Hank 'El Tranq' Loza ====
- Hank 'El Tranq' Loza (Frankie Loyal), a kind-hearted former bare-knuckle brawler and El Pacificador (Sgt-at-Arms) of the Mayans M.C., Santo Padre Charter.

==== Neron 'Creeper' Vargas ====
Neron 'Creeper' Vargas (Joseph Raymond Lucero), an ex-junkie from Los Angeles and a full patch member of the Mayans M.C., Santo Padre Charter and its former Capitan Del Camino (Road Captain). After an investigation into the Mayans' activities by the ATF, he covers for the club and is incarcerated, but maintains club membership.

==== Gilberto 'Gilly' Lopez ====
Gilberto 'Gilly' Lopez (Vincent Vargas), a good-natured mixed martial arts (MMA) fighter, former U.S. Army Ranger, and a full patch member and later Capitan Del Camino of the Mayans M.C., Santo Padre Charter

==== Isaac Packer ====
Isaac Packer (JR Bourne, the President of SAMDINO and a former Nomad who became the leader of a drug community based outside of Santo Padre at an encampment dubbed "Meth Mountain". He was previously ex-communicated from SAMDINO by his older brother and former President, Les Packer due to his unstable nature.

== Recurring ==
=== SAMCRO members ===
==== Orlin West ====
Orlin West a.k.a. "West" (Douglas Bennett) is one of the three Sons Bobby recruited into the Redwood Original Charter in season 6. He was killed at the port warehouse by Lin's men in season 7 while guarding the guns the Sons had stolen from Lin.

==== Go-Go ====
'Go-Go' (Chris Browning), a Nomad who comes to Charming, appears in season 5 and is voted into the club when the Nomad charter closes. He, Frankie, and Greg the Peg are working for Clay and are behind the break-ins and attacks. GoGo is killed by Unser with a double-barrel shotgun when he and Greg the Peg go to kill Unser, unaware that Clay is there and has double-crossed them.

==== Greg the Peg ====
Greg 'The Peg' (Kurt Yaeger) is a Nomad who is missing a leg. He appears in season 5, when he and two other Nomads – Frankie, and GoGo – come to Charming when the Nomad chapter closes, and are voted into SAMCRO. Greg, Frankie, and GoGo are working for Clay and are behind the home invasion attacks. Clay kills Greg by shooting him in the head, when Greg and GoGo attempt to kill Unser, unaware that Clay is there and has double-crossed them.

==== Frankie Diamonds ====
Frankie 'Diamonds' (Chuck Zito), a New York Nomad who comes to Charming, appears in season 5 and is voted into the club when the Nomad charter closes. He, GoGo, and Greg the Peg work for Clay and are behind the attacks and break-ins. Frankie kidnaps Nero and requests $200,000 from the club from the "cartel money." Nero hands over $130,000 in cash and a couple of "nice watches" as payment, in an effort to get Frankie to leave. Frankie shoots Opie's wife Lyla, and takes Chibs as a hostage. He eventually leaves Charming with Mafia protection and is murdered by the same men he thought would protect him, before giving up Clay as the source of the home invasions.

==== Kyle Hobart ====
Kyle Hobart (Brian Van Holt) is excommunicated from the club after abandoning Opie during an arson job, leading to Opie's five-year incarceration. With Clay's blessing, he returns to Charming to see his teenage son, Charlie Hobart (William F. Nicol), and ends up trying to offer SAMCRO a business deal involving stolen goods to serve as repayment for his past mistake. Opie confronts Kyle and the two settle their beef, but Kyle has failed to perform the club mandate to remove his Sons of Anarchy back tattoo, so he is given a choice of removal methods ("fire or knife?"). Choosing fire, the tattoo is burned off Kyle's back with a cutting torch. He loses consciousness during the process, and it is unknown if Kyle is still alive after being left on the steps of St. Thomas Hospital, where his ex-wife, April Hobart (Liane Curtis), is waiting to aid him after being tipped off by Gemma that Kyle would likely need medical care.

==== Herman Kozik ====
Herman Kozik (Kenny Johnson) is a member of the Tacoma chapter of the Sons of Anarchy. He first appeared in the Season 2 episode "The Culling" where he provided extra muscle when the Charming clubhouse was on lockdown. He is a former US Marine and an ex-junkie. He appeared again in the Season 3 premiere at Half-Sack's wake, where he told Clay and Bobby that he wanted to come back to the Charming chapter. When Kozik showed up at SAMCRO with transfer papers, Tig vetoed the vote due to lack of trust. Kozik then decided to stick around to earn Tig's trust. He and Piney lured the Mayans' heroin shipment into SAMCRO's hands after flattening the van's tire. Later Kozik and Tig snuck into St. Thomas to silence the Calaveras member from the drive-by as part of SAMCRO's new deal with the Mayans. Kozik has a contentious relationship with Tig and in episode 3.8, Tig states that it involves a female from both of their pasts. When Tara Knowles and Margaret Murphy are taken hostage, Kozik proves to be useful. When Salazar demands that the club kill Marcus Alvarez, Kozik is the one who convinces Alvarez to play along to help buy time so SAMCRO can find a way to get the women back. Following Tara's rescue, Tig once again votes against Kozik's transfer. It is revealed that the "woman" from both of their pasts was a female dog named Missy. In season 4, Kozik is revealed to have been patched into SAMCRO after Tig went to Stockton Prison, a fact Tig happily accepts upon being released. He was killed in the episode "Call of Duty" by stepping on a landmine that exploded while fighting the cartel; his last words were "You gotta be shittin' me".

==== Eric Miles ====
Eric Miles a.k.a. "Miles" (Frank Potter) is SAMCRO's newest patched-in member. He is introduced in the episode "The Push" as a prospect. Miles assists the club with tasks such as cleaning the clubhouse, providing backup when they break into Salazar's house, and watching Gemma to make sure she doesn't leave the clubhouse when she is hiding from the law. Miles is murdered by Juice to cover up what really happened with the stolen cocaine from the warehouse.

==== John Teller ====
John Thomas 'J.T.' Teller (May 5, 1940 – November 13, 1993) (voiced by Nicholas Guest) founded the Sons of Anarchy with Piney Winston and was the club's first president. He was Gemma's first husband, and they had two children together, Jax and Thomas. Thomas "Tommy" Teller (January 8, 1984 – April 4, 1990), died from a congenital heart defect at six years of age. He also fathered an illegitimate daughter, Trinity, with Maureen Ashby during an extended sojourn in Belfast. As Jax reiterates to Opie in Season 2, episode 10 ("Balm"), J.T. died from injuries sustained from a vehicular accident while riding on I-580 in California. Gemma states in an earlier episode and is shown in a Charming Police Department report in Season 4, episode 2 ("Booster"): after J.T.'s Harley was "sideswiped" by a semi-trailer truck on November 11, 1993, at 13:54; J.T. was dragged 178 yards, taken to St. Thomas Hospital, and died two days later. His home address on the police report is 8824 Sandy Creek in Charming, California. Deputy Chief Wayne Unser signed the report. In season 4, episode 5 ("Brick"), Unser says Clay killed J.T. and had Unser cover it up; Clay responds he merely asked Unser to "lose a little paperwork". Unser retorts that J.T. had written that Clay would make two attempts on his life. In season 7, episode 8 ("Separation of Crows") Jury White says J.T. committed suicide out of guilt for letting SAMCRO become corrupt and deliberately crashed into the semi-trailer, an act of self-sacrifice to protect his club and family from his mistakes. Several times in season 7, SAMCRO members are seen touching the roadside memorial dedicated to J.T. (e.g., in episode 7 "Greensleeves" and episode 13 "Papa's Goods").

==== Rane Quinn ====
Rane Quinn (Rusty Coones) is the former president of the Nomad Charter. He appears in season 5 to help track down one of his former Nomad soldiers. He becomes a member of the Redwood Original charter.

==== Allesandro Montez ====
Allesandro 'Domingo' Montez (Jacob Vargas) is a member of the Sons of Anarchy Motorcycle Club's Reno, NV chapter and later a member of SAMCRO.

==== T.O. Cross ====
Taddarius Orwell 'T.O.' Cross (Michael Beach) is the former president of the Grim Bastards Motorcycle Club. He is voted in as full member of SAMCRO in the series finale, after Jax makes a pact with the other SOA clubs to abolish the unwritten bylaw prohibiting blacks as members, and the Grim Bastards are patched over.

==== Leonard Janowitz ====
Leonard 'Lenny the Pimp' Janowitz (Sonny Barger, a founding member of the Oakland, California chapter of Hells Angels Motorcycle Club). He appeared in episodes of the third, fourth and fifth seasons, and was convicted and jailed for murdering three ATF agents. He was also one of the First Nine original members, the third person to join.

==== Otto Delaney ====
Otto 'Big Otto' Delaney (Kurt Sutter, creator of the series) was a member of the Sons of Anarchy's Charming chapter. He was imprisoned in Stockton state prison on charges of second-degree murder and vehicle theft, but is still in contact with the club. He is a powerful man on the inside and is the leader of the "Big House Crew", a gang of imprisoned Sons of Anarchy members. He takes Chucky Marstein under his protection, and arranges, when Chucky is released, to have SAMCRO protect him from Lin. In Season 2, Zobelle has the Aryan Brotherhood severely beat Otto, to "humble" Clay, and in the process the AB puts out Otto's one good eye, leaving him almost blind. Also that season, Otto is heartbroken when Luann is murdered. In Season 6, U.S. Marshal Lee Toric targets Otto, in retaliation for Otto's having killed Toric's sister, and has Otto repeatedly raped and beaten in prison. Clay smuggles Otto a shank, which Otto uses to kill Toric and then to threaten the guards, in order to commit "suicide by cop".

==== Filthy Phil ====
Phillip 'Filthy Phil' Russell (Christopher Douglas Reed) was one of three new prospects taken on after the death of Kip "Half Sack" Epps. Phil is responsible for guarding the first shipment of cocaine the club receives from the Galindo cartel along with Miles, new prospect Ratboy and Rafi from the Mayans Oakland Chapter. When some of the shipment is stolen, Phil and the other guards are the main suspects despite Juice being the true culprit. Prior to the fifth season, Phil was voted in to be an official member of SAMCRO. In season six, Phil is killed by the IRA.

=== SOA Indian Hills members ===
==== Jury White ====
'Jury' White (Michael Shamus Wiles) is the former president of the friendly Devil's Tribe Motorcycle Club in Indian Hills, Nevada, which SAMCRO patched over without prior warning in Season 1. Jury and John Teller ("J.T.") had served together in the same platoon in Vietnam and remained close friends afterwards. In season 7, SAMCRO called upon "Indian Hills", and in turn Jury recruited "local muscle", to help take down Lin's gun buy (which turned out to include an exchange of guns for heroin) in Selma, and kill Lin's men and customers. Jax, Chibs, and Bobby later killed the "local muscle", and framed them for the takedown in Selma. When Jax later learns one of the murdered "local muscle", Gib O'Leary, was Jury's son, Jax erroneously assumes Jury took revenge by ratting out SAMCRO to Lin. In season 7, episode 8 ("Separation of Crows"), Jury tells Jax that his father didn't die as rumored, in a motorcycle accident resulting from Clay's having sabotaged his bike (on which John died days after colliding with and being dragged by a semi truck). Rather, Jury said, J.T. deliberately "checked out" (committed suicide), as "That Panhead was an extension of John. He would have known if anything was wrong with it the second he kicked it over. [...] Maybe it was his sacrifice. A way of letting his club and family survive." Jax disagreed, saying: "My old man didn't kill himself." After exchanging further words, Jax knocked down Jury, who dropped his gun. When Jury reached for and grabbed it, Jax killed him with a single shot to the head. That action, witnessed by Jury's VP and SAMCRO members, and Jax's confession to it, led to Jax's receiving a unanimous Mayhem vote in the series finale ("Papa's Goods").

==== Needles ====
'Needles' (Jay Thames) is vice president of the Devil's Tribe Motorcycle Club chapter. He follows Jury in patching over into a Sons of Anarchy chapter.

==== Hopper ====
Hopper (Steve Howey) is a Sons of Anarchy North Vegas charter member. He is approached by Bobby Munson to join SAMCRO and says he wants in, but changes his mind after being scared off by the bombing of the SAMCRO clubhouse.

==== Other Indian Hills Members ====
Sometime after the events of season one, Needles is no longer the VP of the Indian Hills charter and has been replaced by Gaines. Gaines is voted in as the charter's president after Jury is killed. Mickey is then voted in as Gaines' new VP.

=== SAMBEL members ===
==== Keith McGee ====
Keith McGee (Andy McPhee) was the president of the Sons of Anarchy Belfast chapter (SAMBEL) in Northern Ireland and a member of the First 9.

==== Liam O'Neill ====
Liam O'Neill (Arie Verveen) was the Sergeant-At-Arms of the Belfast charter of the Sons of Anarchy for 10 years and was in a relationship with Cherry.

==== Seamus Ryan ====
Seamus Ryan (Darin Heames) is the current president of SAMBEL. McGee was the original SAMBEL president and Ryan was the SAMBEL vice president during the betrayals and executions of McGee and Sergeant-at-Arms Liam O'Neill. After McGee and O'Neill are executed, Ryan is tapped as president.

==== Luther Barkwill ====
Luther Barkwill (Dominic Keating), is the current vice president of SAMBEL. He was the road captain for the SOA Sunderland, Tyne and Wear chapter and eventually for SAMBEL. Although hesitant at times, he is a quick reactor. An example includes him being hesitant to run the police off the road to prevent them from hauling off SAMCRO, but after Gemma jumped on the accelerator and ran them off the road, Luther jumped out and started firing rapidly.

==== Padraic Telford ====
Padraic Telford (Lorcan O'Toole), Chibs' nephew, was accidentally killed in an explosion triggered by Liam O'Neill in an attempt to take out SAMCRO.

==== Minor SAMBEL members ====
Following SAMCRO's arrival in Ireland, in an attempt to bring back Abel, several additional members of the Belfast chapter have appeared on the scene, including 'Geezer' (Jason McDonald), and 'Scrum' (Darren Keefe).

=== SAMTAZ members ===
==== Armando ====
Armando (Lobo Sebastian), president of the Sons of Anarchy Tucson chapter (SAMTAZ) in Tucson, Arizona, was beheaded by a cartel. The rest of his body was discovered in the back of a truck by the Sons of Anarchy and the Mayans, and his body was sent back to his club in Tucson, along with his head.

==== Benny ====
Benny (Rolando Molina), the Sergeant-at-Arms for the Tucson chapter, was kicked out with vice president Huff for blackmailing a fellow member, Reggie, and murdering another member in order to cover up a non-club-sanctioned meth cook shop.

==== Huff ====
Huff (Brian Goodman), the vice president of the Tucson chapter, was kicked out for blackmailing a fellow member, Reggie, and murdering another member in order to cover up a non-club-sanctioned meth cook shop.

==== Reggie ====
Reggie (John Bishop), a member of the Sons of Anarchy Tucson chapter (SAMTAZ) in Tucson, Arizona, was caught by former vice president Huff sleeping with another member's wife. Huff used this information to blackmail Reggie in order to cover up a non-club-sanctioned meth cook shop and the murder of another member, who happened to be Reggie's sponsor.

==== Minor SAMTAZ members ====
Paul 'Little Paul', a SAMTAZ member, was murdered by Huff and Benny. Another yet-to-be-named member has also appeared, played by Burton Perez.

=== SAMDINO members ===
The Sons of Anarchy San Bernardino chapter (SAMDINO) is led by president Les Packer (Robert Patrick), while John Hensley portrayed Yates – the two actors having previously played father and son, David and Eric Scatino, in The Sopranos.

=== Tacoma chapter members ===
The Tacoma chapter's president is Lee (Lee "Hamco" Staskunas), while other, still unseen, members include 'Bowie', 'Donut', and Lorca.

=== Additional chapters and members ===
The yet-to-be-named president of the Oregon chapter (Joe Rose) has made one appearance, as well as a yet-to-be-named nomad member (Eric "Mancow" Muller).

=== SAMCRO women ===
==== Lyla Winston ====
Lyla Dvorak-Winston (Winter Ave Zoli), a porn star employed by Luann Delaney, is introduced in season 1. She and Opie begin to grow close from the time they meet. A single parent like Opie, she helps him with his children and marries him in the first episode of Season 4. After Opie's death, she continues to raise his children and goes on to run Red Woody in season 7.

==== Fiona Larkin ====
Fiona Larkin (Bellina Logan) is Chibs' estranged wife, introduced in season 2. Fiona first appears at Chibs' bedside when he is hospitalized after nearly being killed by a car bomb. They have a daughter together, and Fiona still loves Chibs, but was taken as Jimmy O's prize after Jimmy banished Chibs from Ireland.

==== Precious Ryan ====
Precious Ryan (Eileen Grubba) is Bobby's ex-wife and mother of his son.

==== Rita 'Cherry' Zambell ====
Rita 'Cherry' Zambell (Taryn Manning) is a "sweetbutt" (pass around club groupie) from Indian Hills, Nevada, whose real name is Rita Zambell. After leaving her abusive husband and burning down their condo, she aligns herself with the Devil's Tribe. She bonds with Kip "Half-Sack" Epps and eventually becomes his old lady, but SAMCRO sends her to Canada, then Ireland, to escape arrest for arson. She becomes Liam's lover in Ireland.

==== Mary Winston ====
Mary Winston (Julie Ariola) is Piney Winston's ex-wife and Opie's mother. She moved away from Charming, leaving Opie with Piney and then filed for divorce. However, she returns to temporarily look after her grandchildren when Opie is arrested. She consoles the distraught Opie after Donna's murder.

==== Luann Delaney ====
Luann Delaney (Dendrie Taylor) is Gemma's best friend and runs a pornography studio, CaraCara, having received financial backing from Big Otto, her husband. She reluctantly partners with SAMCRO for protection, after her rival Georgie Caruso makes escalating attacks on her business. She begins a sexual relationship with Bobby Munson to buy his silence, after he discovers she has been skimming money from the CaraCara partnership. Ultimately, Georgie has her killed, which devastates Otto.

==== Donna Winston ====
Donna Lerner-Winston (Sprague Grayden) is Opie's first wife and the mother of his two children. She doesn't trust SAMCRO after Opie serves extensive jail time for the club. She is mistakenly murdered by Tig in the Season 1 finale.

=== SAMCRO children ===
==== Kerrianne Telford ====
Kerrianne Larkin-Telford (Q'orianka Kilcher) is the teenage daughter of Chibs Telford and Fiona Larkin, raised by Fiona and Jimmy O'Phelan.

==== Abel Teller ====
Abel Teller (Ryder and Evan Londo) is the son of Jax Teller and Wendy Case. Abel was hospitalized as a newborn due to his premature birth and his mother's drug usage. He was kidnapped by Cameron Hayes in the season 2 finale episode Na Triobloidi, then was put into an adoption of where he was adopted by a catholic Irish family. Jax gets Abel back from the family after they were murdered.

==== Thomas Teller ====
Thomas 'Tommy' Teller (multiple actors) is the son of Jax Teller and Tara Knowles. The younger half-brother of Abel Teller, Thomas is named after Jax's brother and Gemma's second son who died as a child.

==== Dawn & Fawn Trager ====
Dawn 'Margeoux' Trager (Rachel Miner) and Fawn Trager (Lexi Sakowitz) are the daughters of Alex "Tig" Trager and his ex-wife Colleen. Dawn first appears in the episode "With An X." Dawn is burned to death in the season 5 episode Authority Vested in front of Tig by Damon Pope as retaliation for Tig killing his daughter.

==== Ellie & Kenny Winston ====
Ellie and Kenny Winston (Lela Jane Cortines and John Abendroth) are the daughter and son of Opie and Donna Winston.

=== Law enforcement ===
==== Agent Estevez ====
Agent Estevez (Marcos de la Cruz) is an agent of the Department of Justice, working under Agent Stahl to bring SAMCRO down.

==== Deputy David Hale ====
David Hale
- Sons of Anarchy character
- First appearance: "Seeds" (2008)
- Last appearance: "SO" (2010)
- Created by: Kurt Sutter
- Portrayed by: Taylor Sheridan

In-universe information
- Nicknames: Captain America; Dave; Davy
- Title: Deputy Chief
- Occupation: Deputy Chief of the Charming Police Department; Police officer; Marine (retired)
- Family: Jacob Hale (father); Jacob Hale Jr. (brother)

Deputy David Hale (Taylor Sheridan) is the deputy chief of the Charming Police Department. Chief Unser nicknames him "Captain America" for his black-and-white views and squeaky clean image (prior to his involvement with L.O.A.N. and sexual encounter with an ATF agent), adherence to the law and, possibly, because of his square-jawed all-American looks. Hale is murdered at Half-Sack's wake while trying to stop the van of shooters.

==== Lieutenant Althea Jarry ====
Lieutenant Althea Jarry (Annabeth Gish) is the Lieutenant of the San Joaquin Sheriff Department, who is sent to replace the late Eli Roosevelt after his murder. Unser becomes her consultant and helps out in Tara's murder case. Jarry is also shown to have an attraction to SAMCRO member Chibs Telford, which is mutual as they are shown kissing and even sleeping together. She accepts bribe money from the club as a means to earn their trust and establish a working relationship.

==== Agent Josh Kohn ====
Agent Joshua 'Josh' Kohn (Jay Karnes) is a Bureau of Alcohol, Tobacco, Firearms and Explosives agent pretending to investigate SAMCRO. He and Dr. Tara Knowles dated in Chicago until he became threatening and she obtained a restraining order against him. He later stalks Tara in Charming, becoming increasingly violent and unhinged. This culminates in him trying to rape Tara, who shoots him in the gut. Tara calls Jax because she doesn't know what to do with the bleeding out Kohn, and when he insults Tara, Jax kills him. The Santa Rosa Press Democrat called the character "terrifically creepy."

==== Agent Grad Nicholas ====
Agent Grad Nicholas (David Rees Snell) is an FBI agent assigned to investigate the SAMCRO's arms trafficking business. He works closely with Assistant U.S. Attorney Lincoln Potter, often by his side during various points in the investigation. The character's name is a reference to FX network executive Nicholas Grad.

==== DA Tyne Patterson ====
District Attorney Tyne Patterson (C. C. H. Pounder) is the San Joaquin County District Attorney from Stockton assigned to aggressively address the violence plaguing Charming, specifically from a school shooting resulting in the deaths of four children using a gun acquired from the Sons of Anarchy motorcycle club. To do so, she works with former U.S. Marshal Lee Toric to investigate the Sons.

==== US Attorney Lincoln Potter ====
Lincoln 'Linc' Potter (Ray McKinnon), who in Season 4, episode 2 says he is a Modesto, California native, an eccentric, manipulative assistant U.S. attorney operating out of Charming in season 4 and the head of a joint agency task force targeting the Sons of Anarchy's arms trafficking business under the Racketeer Influenced and Corrupt Organizations Act, as well as the Real IRA and the Galindo cartel. He rides a motorcycle, dresses like a biker, and somewhat resembles John Teller, which causes Gemma to ask Lincoln if she knows him. Lincoln disapproves of Hale's conflict of interest as both a real estate developer and local government representative, and in the Season 4 finale produces evidence at the Charming city council meeting about Hale's investor that kiboshes Hale's proposed luxury real estate project.

==== Lieutenant Eli Roosevelt ====
Lieutenant Eli Roosevelt (Rockmond Dunbar) is a member of the San Joaquin County Sheriff's Department and the head of Charming's law enforcement following the dissolution of the Charming Police Department. Prior to his assignment in Charming, he spent 15 years in Oakland working as part of an anti-gang task force. In the Season 6 finale, Eli finds Tara's corpse and, while he's chastising Gemma, Juice shoots him dead to protect Gemma. In Season 4, episode 2 Eli's wife is shown to have fertility problems, and in later episodes that season she helps Gemma, who visits her flower shop for assistance with wilting plants, successfully solicits a $5,000 "Gold Circle Club" donation from Gemma (donated in Tara's name), and receives a $75,000 joint donation from Clay and Oswalt, to save the community garden where Gemma's father taught Gemma to plant seeds. Later in the series Eli's wife is murdered by men Clay hired to scare the town.

==== Agent Smith ====
Agent Smith (Derwin Jordan) is Agent Stahl's ATF partner during the first season.

==== Agent June Stahl ====
Agent June Stahl (Ally Walker) is an ATF agent investigating the club's involvement in arms trafficking after Deputy Chief Hale calls in the ATF in retaliation when Chief Unser does not retire as previously expected. Stahl is responsible for the death of Donna Winston, Opie's wife, when she frames him as a rat to Clay. Later Stahl attempts to frame Chibs. Stahl and Jax make an agreement to get Gemma out of her charges, (that happened when Stahl framed her murder) and for a lighter sentence for the members of SAMCRO. Stahl is killed at the end of season 3, by Opie who tells her, "Put your hands on the wheel. This is what she felt.", referring to the moment his wife (who Tig thought was Opie) was mistakenly gunned down and shot in the back of the head, all because of her lies in framing Opie as a rat to Clay.

==== Sheriff Vic Trammel ====
Sheriff Victor 'Vic' Trammel (Glenn Plummer) was the local sheriff, and an ally of SAMCRO. A close friend of his is murdered by survivalists using guns provided by the Sons, prompting Vic to seriously question his ties to the club.

==== Agent Amy Tyler ====
Amy Tyler (Pamela J. Gray) is an ATF agent who is both June Stahl's professional and personal partner during the third season.

==== Lee Toric ====
Lee Toric (Donal Logue) is a former U.S. Marshal forced into retirement for a variety of reasons, including excessive use of force and racial profiling. It is also mentioned that Toric served in the U.S. Army Special Forces prior to his Marshal service. His only family is his sister Pamela Toric, who works as a nurse at Stockton prison's infirmary. When she is killed by former SAMCRO member Otto Delaney to end the RICO case facing the club, Toric vows revenge. Toric has Otto repeatedly beaten up and raped in prison, hoping to force him into confessing against SAMCRO (as well as satisfying his vengeance for Pamela) and even takes Clay to see the injured Otto in the prison infirmary, though Clay slips Otto a shiv. Believing his tactics are working and he has convinced Otto to bring down SAMCRO, he instead finds a vulgar message about Pamela written on the notepad, prompting him to attack Otto. Otto stabs him multiple times with the shiv and finally slits his throat as the prison guards arrive.

==== Charles Barosky ====
Charles 'Charlie' Barosky (Peter Weller) is a corrupt former police officer who still has ties with the local police agency and controls rackets in Stockton. He makes numerous deals with people to provide police protection for money. His main operation center is a bakery he owns in Stockton.

=== Real IRA members and associates ===
==== Father Kellan Ashby ====
Father Kellan Ashby (James Cosmo) is the consigliere of the Real IRA in Belfast.

==== Maureen Ashby ====
Maureen Ashby (Paula Malcomson) is the widow of Keith McGee. She has ties to the SOA through her late husband and ties to the Real IRA through her older brother, Father Kellan Ashby.

==== Trinity Ashby ====
Trinity Ashby (Zoe Boyle) is Maureen Ashby's adult daughter and McGee's stepdaughter. Her mother Maureen was 18 when she gave birth to Trinity, who is unaware that John Teller, the founder of the Sons of Anarchy, was her real father, and therefore, Jackson (Jax) Teller her half-brother and Thomas Teller would be her half brother too.

She is also the aunt of Thomas and Abel.

==== Brogan, Dooley & Roarke ====
Declan Brogan (Bart McCarthy), Peter Dooley (Paul Collins) and Brendan Roarke (Bob McCracken) are the council of the Real IRA in Belfast. First seen thanking SAMCRO for proving Jimmy O. to have gone rogue, they later propose developing the relationship between the Sons and True IRA even further.

==== Sean & Michael Casey ====
Brothers Sean and Michael Casey (Dan Hildebrand and Glenn Keogh) are members of the Real IRA in Belfast, and very close to Father Ashby. Maureen Ashby describes them as "being like sons to him." Following Father Ashby's order, they kill Cameron Hayes and dispose of his body. Michael is slain by Jimmy O., who attacks Maureen Ashby's home when the SOA are on a protection run in the episode "Turas".

==== Donny ====
Donny (Joel Tobeck) is Jimmy's right-hand man in Belfast. He is a man of reason that tries to keep Jimmy's wild tendencies under control. He successfully tortures Sean Casey for information about Abel Teller.

==== Cameron Hayes ====
Cameron Hayes (Jamie McShane) is McKeavey's cousin and a member of the Real IRA. He becomes SAMCRO's new contact and gun runner after McKeavey's death. Cameron gives back the $200,000 SAMCRO paid for a gun shipment in addition to a month of free guns, as payment for killing Oakland Port Authority Commissioner Brenan Hefner.

==== Edmond Hayes ====
Edmond Hayes (Callard Harris) is Cameron Hayes' son and business partner. He is from South Armagh. Throughout Season 2, he has as much clout in the business as his father, often making deals and judgment calls on his own. Edmond becomes a rat and is later killed by Agent June Stahl when he starts to run, after punching her in abdomen when she says his father, "da raised an Irish pussy". Edmond's death is pinned on Gemma by Agent Stahl, after she follows Polly inside, and kills her in self-defense, just after Stahl kills Edmond.

==== Michael McKeavey ====
Michael McKeavey (Kevin Chapman) is a powerful member of the True IRA who serves as SAMCRO's contact and helps sell illegal weapons through the Sons of Anarchy. His date of birth was April 1, 1966. McKeavey is an old friend to SAMCRO members, including Clay and Piney.

==== Luke Moran ====
Luke Moran (Kevin P. Kearns) is Jimmy O.'s second in command in the U.S., and he is glad to follow his boss' every order. When Jax finds out that Jimmy has been lying to him about Abel's whereabouts, he kidnaps Luke and delivers him to Agent June Stahl as part of his deal with her.

==== James O'Phelan ====
James 'Jimmy O' O'Phelan (Titus Welliver) is the leader of the Real IRA group who sells guns to SAMCRO. Jimmy O. makes his first appearance in season 2 to personally rectify the Hayes' betrayal of SAMCRO, since the Real IRA has long been dependent on the Sons Of Anarchy's Belfast chapter. Jimmy is generally regarded as Chibs Telford's archenemy. When the real IRA have proof of him going behind their backs, he takes Jax's son, Abel, to exchange for a safe passage back to the US. After a long hunt and search, SAMCRO finds out the Russians are hiding him. SAMCRO makes a deal to hand Jimmy over to them. When Agent Stahl gets custody of Jimmy from SAMCRO, Chief Unser pulls them over with a ruse about Jimmy's members waiting ahead in a road block for them. With Stahl's other agents gone, Chibs and a few other members of SAMCRO show up by bus. Chibs pulls Jimmy O. out of the car and slices his mouth, (in the same manner as Jimmy did him years before) and then stabs him to death.

==== Galen O'Shay ====
Galen O'Shay (Timothy V. Murphy) is a high-ranking member of the Real IRA, directly involved in SAMCRO's affairs with the Galindo Cartel. He views Jax as impulsive and reckless following an incident stateside and holds him responsible for the death of Father Kellan Ashby. Cutthroat, stubborn, and ruthless, Galen has no remorse for killing anybody who gets in the way of his business arrangements; for example, he has two members of SAMCRO killed to simply send a message after Jax announces his intention to move away from the gun business. Upon breaking Clay out of prison, Galen is shot dead by Jax.

=== Rival MC members ===
==== Esai Alvarez ====
Esai Alvarez (Kevin Alejandro) is a member of the Mayans Motorcycle Club and the son of Marcus Alvarez. Marcus selects his son to perform hits on both the Nords' leader Ernest Darby and SAMCRO leader Clay Morrow, but Esai and his men botch both hits. Esai was killed by Happy (with his father's approval) shortly afterwards, in a deal to achieve peace with the Nords and SAMCRO.

==== Lander Jackson ====
Lander Jackson (Marcello Thedford) is the vice president of the Grim Bastards Motorcycle Club. He and T.O. had been childhood friends, since age four. He is brutally killed by Edgar, the Sergeant-at-Arms of the rival Calaveras Motorcycle Club; T.O. later kills Edgar in revenge.

==== Roscoe ====
Roscoe (Joseph Julian Soria) is a member of the Calaveras Motorcycle Club Lodi chapter. He is appointed the new president by Marcus Álvarez, following the removal of Hector Salazar.

==== Hector Salazar ====
Hector Salazar (Jose Pablo Cantillo) is the former president of the Lodi chapter of the Calaveras Motorcycle Club, a low-ranking club that does dirty work for the Mayans. The Calaveras perform the drive-by at Half-Sack's wake. He kidnaps Tara and Margaret Murphy and holds them hostage in his aunt's house. This eventually leads to his death by Jax Teller.

=== Gang members ===
==== Jimmy Cacuzza ====
James 'Jimmy' Cacuzza (Jeff Wincott) is the boss of a Mafia family and a friend of Clay's. He and his crew buy weapons from SAMCRO. When the Mayans and Nords blow up SAMCRO's warehouse, delaying SAMCRO's delivery of one of the weapons shipments, SAMCRO hijacks one of Unser's trucks and gives the contents to the Mafia, taking only a 10% return, as a goodwill gesture.

==== Ernest Darby ====
Ernest Darby (Mitch Pileggi) is the head of the Nordics (also known as "Nords"), a white supremacist gang mainly involved in meth trafficking. Darby colludes, at various points, with Alvarez, L.O.A.N., and Hale to discredit and eliminate SAMCRO, to bring drugs into Charming, and to burn down CaraCara. He also, initially, accepts money from Hale to persuade Lumpy to sell his boxing club but refuses to use violence and returns the money.

==== Henry Lin ====
Henry Lin (Kenneth Choi) was the Chinese-American leader of an Oakland-based Triad. His gang is after a man named Chuck Marstein, who was a bookkeeper for their illegal businesses but eventually stole from them. In season 7, he was killed by Juice.

==== Nate Meineke ====
Nate Meineke (Tim De Zarn) is the leader of a local state militia and terrorist group. He served in Vietnam alongside Piney Winston. He and his son, Russell Meineke (James Harvey Ward), buy weapons from SAMCRO and use them to ambush a prison convoy to free one of their members. They plan to go into hiding in Mexico. However, the Sons of Anarchy kill them by bombing their hideout bunker, as they had brought heat onto SAMCRO with the shootings.

==== Romero Parada ====
Romero 'Romeo' Parada (Danny Trejo) is a high-ranking member of the Galindo drug cartel, who has connections to Marcus Alvarez and the Mayans. He is a former Mexican commando that was enlisted by José Galindo to head up the cartel's strategic enforcement unit. At the end of season 4 it is revealed that he and his lieutenant Luis Torres are NCS members working with the CIA to take down rival drug cartels and thus control the Mexican drug trade and stabilize Mexico. Parada and the CIA shut down the RICO case against SAMCRO at the end of season 4 and force Jax to take over leadership of SAMCRO and keep Clay alive to continue the gunrunning operation.

==== Damon Pope ====
Damon Pope (Harold Perrineau) is first mentioned in season 4's finale as the most dangerous gangster in Oakland. A powerful businessman, Damon Pope is also a bloodthirsty, ruthless, and calculating individual who wields influence over many black gangs. He does not hesitate to use extreme violence to demonstrate his power or to make things go his way. After Tig inadvertently kills Pope's daughter by hitting her with a car aimed at Laroy, Pope orders his henchmen to burn one of Tig's daughters alive in front of her father. Later, Pope forces SAMCRO to work for him; however, Jax eventually outsmarts him and tricks Pope to meet in a remote area by promising to give up Tig, whom at Jax's request, Pope agreed to delay killing. After killing Pope's guards, who did not expect an attack, Jax gives a gun to Tig, who shoots Pope in the head.

==== August Marks ====
August Marks (Billy Brown), introduced in season 5, is Damon Pope's right-hand man. Like Pope, Marks projects a courteous and friendly front, but is also extremely ruthless. He states he has been working for Pope since he was 17. He also tells Jax what separates him from Pope is that "Damon made his name on the streets by being the smartest. I (August) made mine by being the deadliest." In the series finale, Jax shoots him dead in revenge for Bobby's murder.

==== Viktor Putlova ====
Viktor Putlova (Keith Szarabajka) the head of the Russian Mafia in Northern California and Oregon. An old acquaintance of Jimmy O.'s, Putlova is hired by Jimmy to help him escape the Real IRA and SAMCRO. However, Putlova betrays Jimmy and makes a deal with SAMCRO to hand over Jimmy in exchange for $2 million.

==== Luis Torres ====
Luis Torres (Benito Martinez) is Romeo Parada's chief lieutenant in the Jose Galindo drug cartel. He is often at Romeo's side. He is a former lieutenant first class in the Mexican Special Forces Airmobile Group and Intelligence. He has a master's degree in logistics from Universidad Veracruzana. Parada was his commanding officer and Torres left Special Forces two weeks after Parada left. Torres' last known tour of duty was fighting the Galindo Cartel. Like Parada, Torres was recruited into NCS working with the CIA to fight rival drug cartels and thus control the Mexican drug trade and stabilize Mexico.

==== Ron Tully ====
Ron Tully (Marilyn Manson) is the leader of the Aryan Brotherhood in the Stockton, California area. He is currently incarcerated in Stockton State prison, where he has great influence as many guards are on his payroll. He becomes an ally to Jax and SAMCRO in season 7, after Jax viciously beats an AB rat and brings Tully two of the rat's teeth. Tully develops a sexual interest in Juice, who gets himself arrested purposely so he can kill Lin, after which Tully is charged by SAMCRO to assassinate Juice.

==== Ule ====
Ule (Jason Matthew Smith) is a member of the League of American Nationals (L.O.A.N.). He has an antagonistic and distrustful relationship with A.J. Weston, and believes that, as Zobelle's right-hand man, Weston's ardent white supremacist beliefs are not allowing L.O.A.N. to broaden their horizons. Gradually, Ule takes Weston's place in L.O.A.N.'s covert activities with the Mayans. When A.J. Weston finds out about the drug trade with the Mayans, he kills the female heroin cookers and executes Ule.

==== Laroy Wayne ====
Laroy Wayne (Tory Kittles) is SAMCRO's contact in the One-Niners street gang and the gang's leader. Laroy buys weapons from SAMCRO and is often in the company of a man with a burned face called Gill (E.R. Ruiz), possibly his second in command. The fictional One-Niners gang also appears in The Shield. Laroy ends up dead when his body ends up in Damon Pope's fire pit that Tig is made to watch go up in flames, as it also contains his daughter, Dawn, as retaliation for the death of Pope's daughter.

==== A.J. Weston ====
A.J. Weston (Henry Rollins) is the muscle, or street leader, of the League of American Nationalists (also known as "L.O.A.N."), a white separatist gang trying to gain control in Charming and force SAMCRO out. A lieutenant and right-hand man of Ethan Zobelle, A.J is an extremely violent ex-convict and ardent white supremacist, albeit also being a loving single father of two young sons, Cliff and Duke. Zobelle and Weston threaten SAMCRO' 's President, Clay Morrow, but when he proves impossible to intimidate, Weston and two other Aryans wearing rubber masks kidnap his wife, Gemma Teller Morrow. They chain her to a fence, beat her, and gang rape her. Weston is eventually killed when SAMCRO ambushes him the bathroom of a tattoo parlor. Weston's son Duke is present, but Weston convinces Jax Teller to allow the child to leave before Jax shoots Weston six times with a silenced pistol, killing him.

IGN gave the second season an 8.4/10 rating, giving praise to Henry Rollins' character, AJ Weston, saying, "A decidedly stronger second season sees the gang unravel and knit back together." His death was voted #2 on IGN's list of Sons of Anarchy's Best Deaths ahead of the airing of the show's third season.

==== Ethan Zobelle ====
Ethan Zobelle (Adam Arkin) is the head of the League of American Nationalists ("L.O.A.N."), a white separatist gang who desires to gain a foothold in Charming and force SAMCRO out. Zobelle moved into Charming and presented himself to the townspeople and local law enforcement as the owner of the newly opened Impeccable Smokes cigar shop on the town's Main Street. Zobelle presented himself to Deputy Chief David Hale as being a means to get SAMCRO out of Charming. After Zobelle makes several unsuccessful attempts to remove SAMCRO from Charming, SAMCRO bikers convince Zobelle's right-hand man A.J. Weston that Zobelle was working behind the brotherhood's back by dealing in the gun and heroin trades with the Mayans, a Mexican MC. It is eventually revealed Zobelle is an F.B.I. informant, and he and his daughter Polly attempt to flee to Budapest. Polly is killed, but Zobelle escapes, and is last seen booking a flight out of a small private airport, which crashed as shown in season 3 episode 1, it is unknown if he survived.

==== Polly Zobelle ====
Polly Zobelle (Sarah Jones) is the scheming daughter and accomplice of Ethan Zobelle. She is the one who initially tricks and subdues Gemma prior to her rape. She also rigs the car bomb which nearly kills Chibs. Deputy Hale extorts her to get information about her father's whereabouts, but she feeds him partially false information, which has extreme repercussions for SAMCRO. She is shot dead by Gemma in retaliation for having her raped.

=== SAMCRO's lawyers ===
- Ally Lowen (Robin Weigert) is a colleague of Rosen's and SAMCRO's new legal counsel as of Season 3.
- Rosen (Tom Everett Scott) is the club's lawyer, who Clay says bills $1,200 an hour. His connection to the club may be at least somewhat personal as well as professional.

=== Miscellaneous ===
- Bachman (Stephen King) is an independent biker and the "cleaner" Tig hires to dispose of the body of Nate's slain caretaker, Amelia Dominguez. The name "Bachman" is a reference to Stephen King's pen name Richard Bachman.
- Georgie Caruso (Tom Arnold) is a rival of Luann Delaney in the pornography business.
- Amelia Dominguez (Monique Gabriela Curnen) is Nate Madock's caretaker. Amelia is an illegal immigrant from Guatemala, with no family in the United States.
- Dondo (David Hasselhoff) is a former pornstar-turned-director, whom Lyla works for after working for Luann Delaney. Luann was his mentor.
- 'Lumpy' Feldstein (Michael Fairman) is a local boxing club owner, a Holocaust survivor, and a close friend of SAMCRO's.
- Floyd (James Carraway) is the town barber in Charming, and his shop is a neutral meeting place for law enforcement and SAMCRO members.
- Jacob Hale Jr. (Jeff Kober) is a businessman and local politician, and the older brother of Deputy Chief David Hale.
- Lowell Harland Jr. (Keir O'Donnell) is a second-generation mechanic at Teller-Morrow Automotive Repair and a drug addict.
- Brenan Hefner (Lyle Kanouse) is the Oakland Port Commissioner.
- Charlie Horse (Randolph Mantooth), the chief of the Wahewa Native American tribe, which manufactures ammunition for the Sons of Anarchy Motorcycle Club. He officiated at Lyla and Opie's wedding, which was held on the reservation.
- Nate Madock (Hal Holbrook) is Gemma's elderly father and a former church pastor. He taught Gemma how to plant seeds at Charming's community garden, which inspires Gemma to contribute $5,000 (in Tara's name) to Lt. Eli's wife's fundraiser to save the garden from being destroyed by Hale's real estate project. Nate has dementia, and Gemma helps him move into the nursing home his wife Rose had selected before she died from cancer. The house he and Rose owned, and the nursing home he is moved to are both near Rogue River, Oregon.
- Chucky Marstein (Michael Marisi Ornstein), a prison friend of Otto's who suffers from chronic masturbation early in the series, was a bookkeeper and counterfeiter for a Triad gang, and later the bookkeeper for CaraCara. He becomes a "Guy Friday" for Gemma and the club.
- Eviqua Michaels (Ashley Monique Clark), the 17-year-old neighbor of Brenan Hefner's mistress, witnesses Brenan's murder.
- Milo (Michael Chiklis) is a truck driver from Northern California who befriends Gemma in season 7.
- Margaret Murphy (McNally Sagal; Katey's sister in law) is an administrator at St. Thomas Hospital; she disapproves of Tara's relationship with Jax and the Sons of Anarchy, but later proves to be a great support to Tara.
- Neeta (Cleo King) becomes Abel's babysitter during Season 2. Following Abel's kidnapping, she has not reappeared on the show.
- Elliott Oswald (Patrick St. Esprit) is a prominent businessman and ranch owner in Charming. He claims his family has been in Charming longer than SAMCRO and that he has trouble getting along with SAMCRO, although he seeks out Clay's help when Oswald's daughter disappears at a carnival and is later found to have been raped by a carny. From that point on, Oswald becomes a go-to person for the club, and in turn, the club helps him avoid being taken advantage of by Hale and Zobelle's "eminent domain" scam.
- Skeeter (Bob Rusch), is a gravedigger and cremator for Dubrowski's Funeral Home. He assists SAMCRO by providing cadavers and body parts.
- Ima Tite (Kristen Renton), introduced in season 2, is a porn star employed by Luann Delaney.
- Venus Van Dam (Walton Goggins), is a transgender prostitute born Vincent Noone. Venus and the club help each other on several occasions and she becomes romantically involved with Tig. She has a son from before her transition that believes she is his aunt instead of his parent. She enlists the club's help to save her son from her mother because her mother is creating child pornography involving him.
