= Jax Teller =

Fictional character from Sons of Anarchy

- Sons of Anarchy character
- Charlie Hunnam as Jax Teller
- First appearance: "Pilot" (2008)
- Last appearance: "Papa's Goods" (2014)
- Created by: Kurt Sutter
- Based on: Prince Hamlet
- Portrayed by: Charlie Hunnam

In-universe information
- Nicknames: Jackie Boy; Jackie; The Prince; Handsome Jack; The King; Jax
- Title(s): Vice President (season 1-4) President (season 4-7)
- Affiliation: Sons of Anarchy Motorcycle Club
- Family: John Teller (father): Gemma Teller Morrow (mother); Clay Morrow (stepfather); Thomas Teller (brother); Trinity Ashby (half-sister); Nate Madock (grandfather); Rose Madock (grandmother); Nathaniel Madock (uncle)
- Spouses: Wendy Case (Ex-wife); Tara Knowles
- Children: Abel Teller; Thomas Teller

Jackson Nathaniel "Jax" Teller is a fictional character and the main protagonist of the FX television series Sons of Anarchy, portrayed by Charlie Hunnam. A member of the titular outlaw motorcycle club, he spends the series as the Vice President and later President of the Sons of Anarchy Motorcycle Club Redwood Original (SAMCRO), charter based in the fictional town of Charming, California. The son of John Teller, one of the club's founding members, Jax's conflict between wanting to maintain the longevity of his father's organization by reducing the criminal element and his desire to become a law-abiding family man despite increasing levels of violence forms the central conflict of the series.

The character and Hunnam's portrayal have been received positively by critics. Hunnam was twice nominated for the Critics' Choice Television Award for Best Actor. The character's evolution into a brutal antihero and even villain has been described as both "shocking" and "brilliant". His character is based on Hamlet from William Shakespeare's play of the same name.

== Character ==
Jax Teller was born in 1978 to John and Gemma Teller. He was raised within the world of SAMCRO as his father, a Vietnam veteran, was the founder and President of the club. John Teller died in a road accident on November 13, 1993, with leadership of SAMCRO passing to Clay Morrow who would eventually marry Gemma, becoming Jax's step-father. Jax is a trained mechanic and possesses a GED.

Jax is depicted dressing as unconventional compared to traditional bikers almost influenced by urban street culture, specifically wearing white Nike Air Force 1 sneakers throughout the series.

In season seven, retired Charming police chief Wayne Unser describes Jax as, "formidable, as smart as he is dangerous". By the series end, Jax's kill count numbered 46.

== Storyline ==
=== Season 1 ===
In 2008, Jax serves as SAMCRO's Vice President and works as a mechanic at his family-owned automotive repair shop. Since 1979, SAMCRO has held sway over the town of Charming, a small community in San Joaquin County, California. The club also protects Charming from other criminal elements while working closely with its Chief of Police, Wayne Unser. A convicted felon, Jax previously served time in prison for gunrunning. He is estranged from his pregnant wife Wendy Case; a heroin addict who overdoses and endangers the life of their unborn son Abel, who is born premature. Jax discovers a manuscript by his late father, "The Life and Death of SAM CROW: How the Son's of Anarchy Lost Their Way", in which John describes his growing disillusionment with the chaotic and violent life of the club. His mother Gemma, discovers that Jax has read the letters and worries that it will drive him away from the club.

Jax renews a relationship with his high-school sweetheart, Tara Knowles, a neonatal surgeon at the local hospital who operates on Abel. The destruction of a gun warehouse brings unwanted attention on SAMCRO from both local and federal law enforcement, specifically the ATF. As Jax attempts to lead SAMCRO into more peaceful resolutions with other competitors and rivals, he discovers that Tara is being stalked by a former boyfriend, ATF agent Josh Kohn. After multiple confrontations with Kohn, Jax murders him after he attempts to rape Tara.

In order to continue their gun selling relationship with the IRA, SAMCRO is tasked with killing a member of the port authority. Jax, Opie Winston, and Bobby Munson complete the murder but a witness identifies Bobby as the shooter. The ATF investigates SAMCRO for their involvement and ATF agent June Stahl attempts to make Opie out to be the federal informant who ratted on Bobby. Club President and Jax's step-father Clay Morrow and Sgt at Arms Tig Trager secretly orchestrate a plan to kill Opie and pin the kill on the One-Niners; an African American street gang from Oakland. However, Tig mistakenly kills Opie's wife Donna in a botched drive-by shooting. Jax rescues the actual informant from being killed by SAMCRO and deduces that Clay is responsible for Donna's death, causing a rift within the club.

=== Season 2 ===
SAMCRO is confronted by the League of American Nationalists (LOAN), a powerful white separatist organization led by wealthy businessman Ethan Zobelle and right-wing extremist, A.J. Weston. LOAN demands that SAMCRO end their sales of guns to non-white criminal organizations. When SAMCRO refuses, LOAN has Gemma kidnapped and gang raped. LOAN attempts to work with anti-SAMCRO businessman Jacob Hale, brother of self-righteous Deputy Chief David Hale, as well as SAMCRO's local rivals, the white supremacist Nords and the Stockton-based Mayans M.C. SAMCRO engages LOAN while the ATF continues to investigate the club and its connection to the IRA. LOAN outmaneuvers SAMCRO and they are lured into attacking Zobelle and Weston at a church and are subsequently arrested. Jax and Clay get into a fist fight while in jail but SAMCRO is released on bond. Jax prepares to leave SAMCRO by joining the "nomad" charter but Gemma reveals the details of the rape, causing Jax to change his mind. Jax kills A.J. Weston but Ethan Zobelle escapes after an IRA member kills prospect Half-Sack Epps and kidnaps Abel.

=== Season 3 ===
Jax and SAMCRO attempt to find Abel and learn he has been taken to Belfast. Stahl attempts to make a deal with Jax behind the club's back in order for the ATF to take down the IRA. Jax, Gemma, and some of SAMCRO travel to Belfast in search of Abel and learn that he has been given to a Catholic adoption center. Jax also learns that his father had a secret family in Belfast and that he has a half-sister named Trinity, daughter of Maureen Ashby, sister of high-ranking IRA priest, Kellan. SAMCRO kills the disloyal members of the Sons of Anarchy's Belfast charter (SAMBEL), and Jax finds Abel, nearly leaving him in the care of a loving couple who adopted him but they are murdered by rogue IRA member Jimmy O'Phelan. Kellan Ashby sacrifices himself so that Jax can take Abel home. Returning to Charming, agent Stahl double crosses Jax and tells the club about the side deal Jax made with her, unaware that Jax and SAMCRO orchestrated the entire plan together. Jax and other members of SAMCRO are taken to prison, Chibs Telford kills O'Phelan, and Opie kills Stahl.

=== Season 4 ===
Jax is released after a 14 month prison sentence and returns home to Tara, who has given birth to their son Thomas. Jax reveals to Tara that he plans to leave SAMCRO in good-standing if he backs Clay in a newly brokered deal with the Galindo Mexican drug cartel to sell them guns and mule their cocaine. As Jax attempts to navigate complex deals with local criminal organizations, the IRA, and the cartel, he learns that a United States Attorney is conducting a RICO operation against the club and its associates. Jax learns that the cartel members are working with the C.I.A. to topple a rival cartel and they need SAMCRO to continue running guns to accomplish this. As a result, the RICO operation is shelved but Jax finds that growing levels of violence continues to be a daily occurrence for SAMCRO. Additionally, Jax learns that Clay killed his father and becomes consumed with the need for revenge. Jax also learns that Clay previously killed founding SAMCRO member Piney Winston and attempted to have Tara killed to avoid this knowledge from being shared. Opie attempts to kill Clay but Jax rescues him as he needs Clay alive so that the IRA will continue to work with the cartel. Falsely believing Clay was attacked by the One-Niners, Tig attacks the gang's leader Laroy Wayne and mistakenly kills his girlfriend Veronica, daughter of Oakland crime boss Damon Pope. Jax forces Clay to relinquish the Presidency.

=== Season 5 ===
Now President of SAMCRO and with the threat of RICO presently diminished, Jax leads the club in its continued partnership with the cartel while working on a strategy to have other organizations take over their business so that SAMCRO can free itself from criminality. However, Jax, Chibs, and Tig are arrested in relation to Veronica Pope's murder and are transported to county jail along with Opie. There, Pope uses his influence to have a member of SAMCRO killed, resulting in Opie's death. Devastated by the loss of his best friend, Jax reluctantly strikes a deal with Pope and SAMCRO enters into a business relationship with him. Jax grows increasingly violent and his continued attempts to get SAMCRO free of the cartel and gunrunning fails. Jax learns that Juice Ortiz was informing law enforcement of SAMCRO's actions and forces him to become completely subservient to him. Jax reveals Clay's actions including the murder of John Teller and Piney Winston, and SAMCRO subsequently excommunicates Clay from the M.C. The vote to kill Clay narrowly passes with only Bobby voting no, causing a rift between him and Jax; and Bobby steps down as Vice President. Jax orchestrates the murder of Damon Pope by Tig and implicates Clay, who is arrested. Tara is arrested after being connected in the murder of a nurse by imprisoned SAMCRO member and informant, Otto Delaney.

=== Season 6 ===
Jax attempts to grow SAMCRO's legal escorting business with Gemma's new love interest, pimp Nero Padilla; but strife continues within SAMCRO. Tara returns home and begins to secretly arrange for Jax's ex-wife, Wendy, to become the legal guardians of Abel and Thomas. After a child commits a mass shooting with an automatic weapon SAMCRO sold to Nero's former gang, Jax attempts to relieve local pressure by giving the gun business to other organizations, but IRA boss Gaalen O'Shay refuses. Jax attempts to deny O'Shay, resulting in the IRA murdering SAMCRO members Phil Russell and V-Lin, and blowing up the SAMCRO clubhouse. Meanwhile, retired U.S. Marshal Lee Toric seeks revenge for the death of his sister by imprisoned SAMCRO member Otto Delaney, attempting to persuade Clay to become an informant. Toric uses dirty tactics but is killed by Otto after Clay gives him a knife. Jax delivers an emotional speech to the Sons of Anarchy charters across the Northwest, explaining the deadly cost of gunrunning and SAMCRO's plan to remove itself from the business; the other charters support him. SAMCRO and the IRA strike a deal to allow Clay to handle the gunrunning business. Clay is released and meets with O'Shay, but Jax subsequently kills them both, convincing IRA member Connor Malone to give the gunrunning business to Pope's successor, August Marks. Tara fakes a miscarriage after pretending to be assaulted by Gemma and prepares to divorce Jax. She makes a deal with the district attorney in order to leave Charming and enter into witness protection. After hearing Tara's plight, Jax decides to allow Tara to leave with the boys and turn himself in to law enforcement. Gemma, unaware that Jax made the deal, confronts and murders Tara. Jax returns home and finds his dead wife as well as the body of sheriff's deputy Lt. Eli Roosevelt, who Juice killed to protect Gemma.

=== Season 7 ===
Following Tara's death, Jax becomes unhinged. Believing Tara's murder to have been committed by the Chinese Triad, he exacts revenge on them and acts violently toward anyone who stands in his way, unraveling the criminal underworld in Northern California in the process. As a result, Jax and SAMCRO go head-to-head with the Triad and, by association, August Marks, resulting in Bobby being killed. Jax forces Juice to get arrested so that he can kill Triad crime boss Henry Lin. Jax has Marks arrested, leads an ambush on Marks' hit squad, and brokers an agreement between the IRA, Aryan Brotherhood, Mayans M.C. and One-Niners. Jax meets with Northwestern Sons of Anarchy presidents and admits to killing Jury White, making a deal to convince SAMCRO to excommunicate and execute him. Juice kills Lin and reveals to Jax that his mother killed Tara and he helped cover it up. Jax has Juice killed, murders Unser and Gemma, gives custody of Abel and Thomas to Wendy, and asks Nero to help get his sons out of Charming and ensure they grow up hating their father. In his last act as SAMCRO's president, he patches-in T.O. Cross, the first African-American SOA member. Jax is then excommunicated from the M.C. by choice and ties up loose ends by killing August Marks and corrupt former cop Charles Barosky. Chibs becomes President of SAMCRO, and the club votes for Jax to meet "Mr. Mayhem" (an execution), but allow him to leave by staging an escape. Jax takes his father's motorcycle, and leads law enforcement on a massive chase on the interstate. Closing his eyes with a smile and bracing himself for death, Jax collides head-on with a semi-truck, dying in a similar way and on the same highway as his father before him.

== Origins and critical response ==
In preparation for the role, Hunnam spent time with an outlaw motorcycle club in Oakland, California and met a 22-year-old member who had spent his entire life raised around the club. Hunnam based Jax's personality and attire on this real life biker, who was killed in a shooting one week into the production of the show's first season.

Teller was named as one of TV's best dads by Dadcentric.com, and they described him as a "brutal anti-hero" and a "rebel who never lives by society's rules". However, they also highlight how the birth of Abel and the discovery of his father's memoirs transformed him as a person. The Chicago Tribune remarked that Jax is "the heir apparent to the gang", but "has a great deal of nostalgia for his father’s more hippie-ish early hopes for the motorcycle club".
