= David Labrava =

American actor

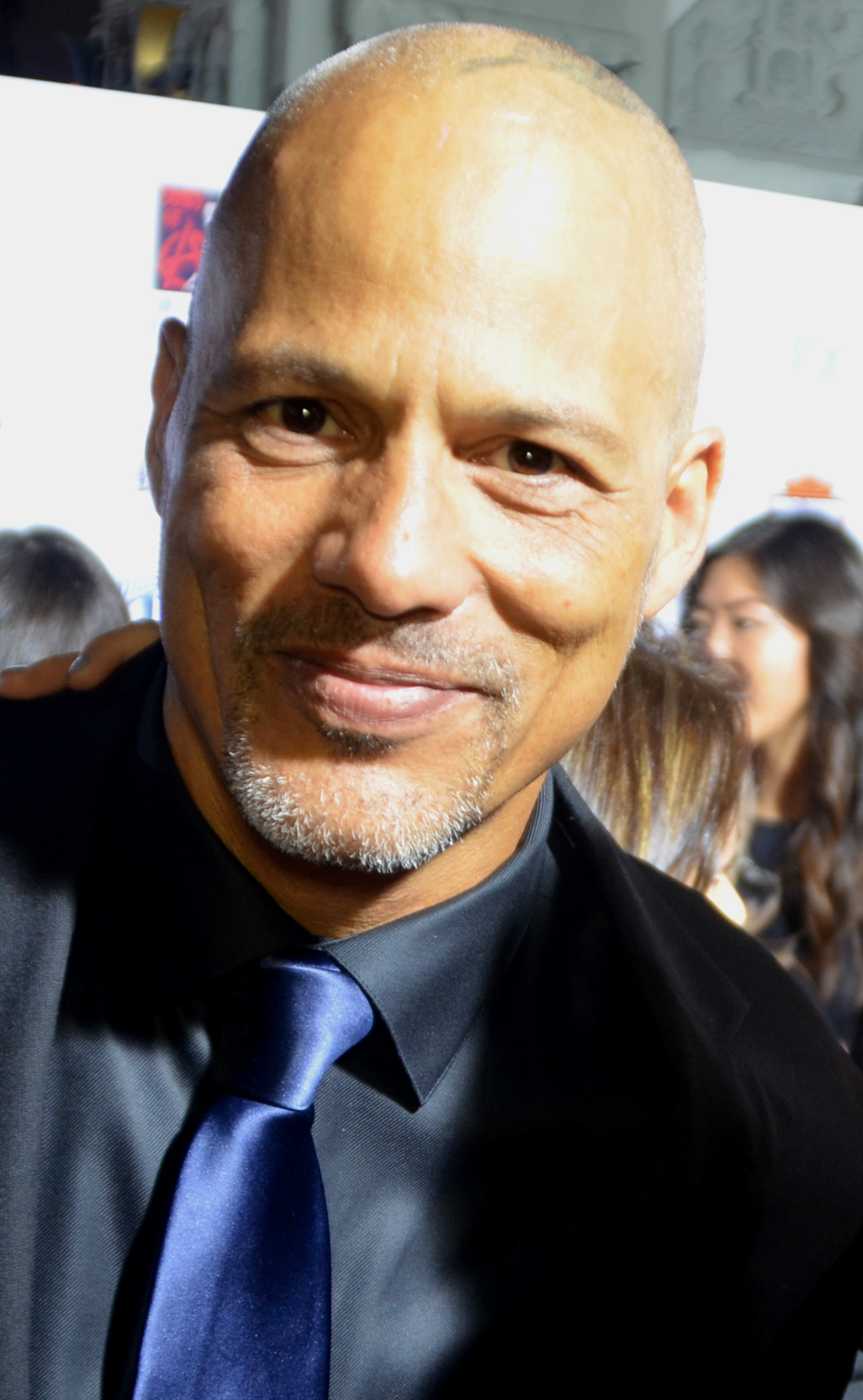
- Labrava in 2014
- Born: David M. Labrava; October 19, 1962 (age 64); Miami, Florida, U.S.
- Occupations: Actor; producer; director; author; writer; glass artist; tattoo artist
- Known for: Playing Happy Lowman on Sons of Anarchy (2008–2014), and Mayans M.C. (2018–2023)

David M. Labrava (born October 19, 1962) is an American actor, writer, glass artist, tattoo artist, former member of the Hells Angels, and motorcycle enthusiast. He is best known for his role as Happy Lowman in the FX series Sons of Anarchy and its spinoff, Mayans M.C..

== Early life ==
Labrava was born in Miami, Florida, and spent time in Amsterdam, where he worked as a tattoo artist and bouncer at a club. He grew up riding dirt bikes and got his first Harley Davidson when he was 17. At 14, he was cooking chicharrón with Cubans in Hialeah, Florida.

== Career ==
Labrava was initially hired as a technical advisor for Sons of Anarchy before being cast in the role of Happy Lowman. He remained with the show from its inception in 2008 until its finale in 2014. He also co-wrote season 4, episode 10, titled "Hands".

Labrava has authored a best-selling autobiography entitled Becoming A Son.

Labrava wrote, produced, directed, and starred in his first feature film, Street Level in 2015.

Additionally, he writes the "Burnin' Rubber with Jimmy Carbone" column in the national hot rod magazine, Ol' Skool Rodz. He is credited as Dave "D.L." Labrava. Previously, he used to write for The Horse motorcycle magazine and built a bike that made the cover in March 2001.

== Personal life ==
Labrava resides in Eugen, Oregon, with his dogs, he is a devout Christian who also studies Buddhism.

His son, Tycho, died by suicide on May 5, 2018, at the age of 16. There had been no previous outward signs of depression or any other mental health issues. Labrava wrote on Instagram, "I am broken," and encouraged his followers to communicate with their loved ones, because "there may not be any signs."

=== Legal issues ===
In 2008, Labrava was arrested in Missoula County, Montana, on two felony counts of possession of marijuana and two misdemeanor counts for possession of paraphernalia. A search warrant was obtained for his hotel room. After the search warrant was executed, 1.5 grams of hashish and a pipe were discovered.

== Filmography ==
Year	Title	Role	Notes
2008–2014	Sons of Anarchy	Happy Lowman	Television series Main role 71 episodes Also a consultant
2015	Street Level	Rico	Film
2016	The Package	Tony	Short
2017	1% - The Voice Within	Top Dog	Film
2018	Lucifer	Mike	Television series 1 episode
2018–2023	Mayans M.C.	Happy Lowman	Television series 8 episodes
2019	Tyga & YG & Santana: Mamacita	Himself	Music Video
2020	Hunter's Moon	Vinnie	Film
2021	Shadows	Nicolas	Film; Post-production
TBD	Irish Whisper 'The' Story of Jimmy Haye	Tellis	Film; Pre-production
