= Jihad (EP) =

EP by Otep
- Released: June 19, 2001
- Recorded: May 2001
- Genres: Nu metal; rap metal; gothic metal
- Length: 23:41
- Label: Capitol
- Producer: Rich Costey

Otep chronology
Jihad (2001)	Sevas Tra (2002)

Singles from Jihad
- 1. "T.R.I.C/The Lord Is My Weapon" Released: 2001

Jihad (also known as Otep on European versions) is the debut EP and release by American nu metal band Otep. It was released on June 19, 2001, by Capitol Records. It is the only Otep release to feature guitarists Traver Marsh and Dave "Spooky" Aguilera, who were fired from the band shortly after the EP's release.

== Background ==
Otep was formed in November 2000. After an appearance at the Roxy Theatre (their fourth show) in February 2001, the band was selected by Sharon Osbourne to appear on the bill for Ozzfest 2001, despite the fact they had no record deal or demo. This increased the band's attention, and Nik Frost, an A&R representative, signed the band to Capitol Records in March 2001. The band publicly announced and celebrated the label signing with a performance at The Viper Room on April 5, 2001.

Capitol signed the band on the belief the band had written eleven songs; in reality, Otep had lied, as they only had five or six playable songs that were around eight months old at the time of Jihad's recording, but the band was not worried about needing new songs as Otep Shamaya had already written all of the lyrics, and the band was on a creative spree at the time.

== Recording and composition ==
After signing to Capitol, the band headed to Indigo Ranch in Malibu, California to create some demos. Afterwards, they started working on their EP with producer Rich Costey. Capitol gave the band one week to complete the EP, which meant its production was rushed, and the songs were not as fleshed out or developed as they could have been. Despite these time constraints, Otep was overall satisfied with the quality of the songs.

=== Composition ===
Jihad is generally described as nu metal, rap metal and gothic metal. Otep Shamaya's vocals consist of screaming, growling and rapping, as well as elements of spoken word.

The album was written in a stream of consciousness style, whereby no songs were written prior to being played, but rather played spontaneously; "If we try to write something it's not going to be as fulfilling or sound as interesting as it would if we do it and it simply comes from someplace that we have no control over." Shamaya described the writing style as "a surrender to the subconscious". This is best shown on the EP's third track, "Germ", an improvisational spoken word song, with drummer Mark Bistany creating percussion with a variety of objects such as a napkin dispenser, an aluminum ladder, a plastic tree, a sneaker and a toaster. Otep described jazz, funk and fusion music, originating from each of the band member's musical backgrounds, as an influence on the sound of the EP. Otep recorded her vocals with a microphone previously owned by The Doors' Jim Morrison; Otep has cited The Doors as a musical influence.

=== Themes ===
Jihad was aesthetically and lyrically influenced by occultism, ancient cultures and Egyptian and Greek mythology. The EP's opening track, "Possession", was described by Otep Shamaya as "very ritualistic. It had to have a ceremonial feel to it so we went in, we tried to push ourselves into this really aggressive trancelike state." The song's ending, which differed greatly from the Indigo Ranch-demoed version of the song, was changed by the band and Rich Costey to give the song more atmosphere. Jihad also touches on topics such as organised religion ("The Lord Is My Weapon"), rape ("Filthee"), politics and feminism. Compared to other female acts in the nu metal genre such as Kittie, feminism and gender was a large influence on the EP's lyrics; "My gender has everything to do with what I do. I think that people get the wrong idea about what feminism is. To me feminism isn't just trying to be what men are it's trying to be everything that a woman is, which isn't weak, small, or thoughtless. It's something strong and powerful. I think it's important that people recognize, that I am a woman and that's great and that doesn't make me any less powerful than other bands like Slipknot and Mudvayne."

All of the songs on Jihad, aside from "Germ", were re-recorded for the band's debut album Sevas Tra, with "The Lord is My Weapon" being renamed "Sacrilege".

== Release and promotion ==
Professional ratings
Review scores
Source	Rating
Dagensskiva.com	4/10
RockHard	6.5/10
Ultimate Guitar	7.8/10

Jihad was released in the United States on June 19, 2001, by Capitol Records as a digipak CD. The EP was planned to be released in Europe in September 2001; following the September 11 attacks, the EP was delayed and released on November 19, 2001, under the re-titled name Otep. To promote the record, Capitol released a promotional cassette with "T.R.I.C." and "The Lord Is My Weapon", with the band recording their first ever music video for "T.R.I.C.".

Otep toured in support of the EP from May to September 2001. The band toured the US and appeared at Ozzfest 2001. Their headlining show in Detroit, Illinois, was their eighth show and the band's performance of "Filthee" was recorded and released on the live compilation album Ozzfest 2001: The Second Millennium. Otep were the only female band on the Ozzfest 2001 bill. Following Ozzfest, Marsh and Aguilera were fired from the band, as they were not fitting in with the rest of the band. They were both permanently replaced by Rob Patterson for the rest of the tours that year. After completing the tours, Otep headed back into the studio to start writing songs for Sevas Tra, which they had previously teased on the EP's liner notes.

As of June 2002, Jihad has sold over 25,000 copies in the United States, according to Nielsen Soundscan.

== Track listing ==
All lyrics are written by Otep Shamaya; all music is composed by Otep.

No.	Title	Length
1.	"Possession"	5:05
2.	"The Lord Is My Weapon"	3:40
3.	"Germ"	8:31
4.	"Filthee"	3:29
5.	"T.R.I.C." (The Revolution Is Coming)	2:55
Total length:		23:41

== Personnel ==
Personnel per liner notes.

Otep

- Otep Shamaya - vocals/backing vocals, art direction
- Jason "eViL j" McGuire - bass, backing vocals on "The Lord Is My Weapon"
- Mark "Moke" Bistany - drums, assorted percussion on "Germ"
- Tarver Marsh - guitars
- Dave "Spooky" Aguilera - guitars

Production

- Rich Costey - producer, engineering, mixer
- Eddy Schreyer - mastering
- Xen Lang III - executive producer, management

Artwork

- Wendy Dougan - art direction, design

Management

- Ron Laffitte and Perry Watts-Russel - A&R
- Franklin Management Group: management

== Release history ==
Country	Date
United States	June 19, 2001
Europe	November 19, 2001
