= Sounds Like Armageddon =

Live album by Otep
- Released: November 6, 2012
- Genre: Alternative metal, nu metal
- Length: 57:37
- Label: Victory
- Producer: Otep Shamaya

Otep chronology
Atavist (2011)	Sounds Like Armageddon (2012)	Hydra (2013)

Professional ratings
Review scores
Source	Rating
AllMusic	3/5 stars
Metal Forces	(5/10)

Sounds Like Armageddon is a live album by the American heavy metal band Otep. It was released on November 6, 2012, on Victory Records. The album closes with Otep thanking the audience and Kurt Cobain, and then playing a cover version of Nirvana's song "Breed".

== Track listing ==
No.	Title	Length
1.	"Battle Ready"	5:26
2.	"Filthee"	3:50
3.	"Crooked Spoons"	4:53
4.	"Blood Pigs"	7:17
5.	"Confrontation"	5:17
6.	"My Confession"	7:35
7.	"Rise, Rebel, Resist"	3:51
8.	"T.R.I.C."	4:10
9.	"Ghostflowers"	6:14
10.	"Fists Fall"	4:38
11.	"Breed" (Nirvana cover)	4:26
Total length:		57:37

== Personnel ==
=== Otep ===
- Otep Shamaya - vocals
- Ari Mihalopoulos - guitar
- Erik Tisinger - bass guitar
- Chase Brickenden - drums

=== Production ===
- FOH/sound engineer - Tristan Wallace
- Executive producer - Otep Shamaya
- Mastering - Alan Douches
- Art direction - Otep Shamaya
- Artwork - Mike C. Hardcore
- Inside Otep illustration - Joey James
- Layout - Jason Link
