= House of Secrets (album) =

2004 album by Otep

- Standard cover (Note: Limited editions of the album were shipped with anaglyphic 3D artwork.)

Studio album by Otep
- Released: July 27, 2004
- Recorded: 2003
- Studio: Rocket Carousel (Los Angeles)
- Genres: Death metal; nu metal; heavy metal
- Length: 44:21
- Label: Capitol
- Producer: Greg Wells

Otep chronology
Sevas Tra (2002)	House of Secrets (2004)	The Ascension (2007)

Singles from House of Secrets
- 1. "Warhead" Released: May 4, 2004; 2. "Buried Alive" Released: August 19, 2004

House of Secrets is the second studio album by the American heavy metal band Otep, released on July 27, 2004, through Capitol Records. Recorded in late 2003 with producer Greg Wells at Rocket Carousel Studios in Los Angeles, it is a death metal, nu metal and heavy metal album whose songs alternate between aggressive metal segments and atmospheric passages. In an effort to raise the band's technical level, vocalist Otep Shamaya enlisted Joey Jordison of Slipknot to play drums on six of its tracks. Its lyrics explore themes of abuse, angst, self-loathing, paranoia, healing, self-determination, and breaking out of victimhood.

House of Secrets received mixed reviews from music critics, who praised its songwriting and Shamaya and Jordison's performances, though some criticized its lyrics as overwrought and overly self-loathing. The album debuted at number 93 on the US Billboard 200 chart and number 102 on the French Albums chart. "Warhead" and "Buried Alive" were released as singles with music videos. Otep performed on the second stage of Ozzfest and toured with Kittie and Crisis in 2004, before embarking on the headlining Alliance of Defiance and Mouthful of Madness tours in 2005.

== Background and recording ==
Otep began working on House of Secrets after performing on the Ozzfest tour in support of their debut album, Sevas Tra (2002). "Buried Alive" was first song written for the album. Vocalist Otep Shamaya said that going into the album, she was frustrated with what she saw as the "fabricated" way albums were made and sought to create memorable songs without using standard structures. She also wanted the album to raise Otep's "technical level", with aggressive drumming providing its "dominant rhythm". Otep's record label Capitol Records did not pressure the band to come up with more commercial material, and were encouraged to be as true to themselves as possible by their A&R representative.

Otep recorded House of Secrets in late 2003 at Rocket Carousel Studios in Los Angeles with producer Greg Wells. The album's working title was Suicide Trees. Shamaya described Wells as a "mentor" for Otep, praising his musical and instrumental abilities and crediting him with pushing the band musically. She worked on songs with Wells based on how she was feeling at the time. Wells wrote the music for six of the album's tracks, and co-wrote an additional three; bassist Jason "eViL J" McGuire also contributed to the writing of three songs. Guitarist Rob Patterson, who was fired from Otep midway through recording due to creative differences, played on three songs and co-wrote "Buried Alive" and "Nein". After reaching out to Slipknot's manager, Shamaya enlisted Joey Jordison to play drums on six of the album's tracks. Jordison composed his parts around instrumentals that Otep played for him; according to Shamaya, he almost asked the band to record the songs live. Once recording was completed, House of Secrets was mastered by Howie Weinberg and Roger Lian at Masterdisk in New York.

== Composition ==
=== Overview ===
House of Secrets is a death metal, nu metal and heavy metal album incorporating gothic, carabet, alternative rock, hip-hop, funk and ambient elements. The album's songs feature drop-tuned instruments, double bass drumming, dynamic shifts, and loose, unpredictable arrangements alternating between aggressive metal segments and atmospheric passages. Shamaya alternates between growls, guttural screams, whimpers, whispers, singing, and spoken word poetry. When asked about the differences between House of Secrets and Sevas Tra, Shamaya said the former had the "same roots" as the latter but was "a much bigger tree", and viewed it as being heavier and more creative.

The lyrics of House of Secrets include references to mythology and explore themes of abuse, angst, self-loathing, paranoia, healing, self-determination, and breaking out of victimhood. Shamaya said that the "house of secrets" in the title referred to "the deepest, darkest depths of the personality in which the true self lies hidden", and hoped that by the end of the album, listeners would understand that they can move on from a place of desperation and victimhood to a more victorious one. She later described it as a concept album. "Warhead" is the only political song on House of Secrets, and Shamaya was dismayed by critics who categorized the album as politically charged because of it.

=== Songs ===
House of Secrets opens with "Requiem", a haunting track marked by chanting, gongs, scissors, screams, and howling. Shamaya intended the track to represent the death of part of herself, which she viewed as a necessary sacrifice so she could write the album, and explore the artistic qualities of death in contrast with Sevas Tra's themes of how art can save. An unknown voice was recorded at the end of the song, which was kept in at Shamaya's insistence. "Warhead" is a death metal-influenced antiwar protest song against then-United States president George W. Bush, whom Shamaya portrays as an illegitimate and undemocratic leader and accuses of misleading the American public and politicians into supporting the Iraq war. She subsequently calls upon her "tribe" to join an "alliance of defiance" to stop both him and the war. "Buried Alive" features a "haunting" bassline and sees Shamaya repeat the lyric "I hate my life" against "a backdrop of white-light distortion". Shamaya used the song as an outlet for pain and depression she was feeling at the time, and based part of its lyrics off the Greek mythological figure Cassandra. "Sepsis" explores ancient Babylonian beliefs and begins with a reference to the opening line of the Epic of Gilgamesh, Sha naqba īmuru. McGuire's guitar and bass parts drew inspiration from aincent war songs. "House of Secrets" is about the difficulty of identifying who one's enemy is. The song starts out with bluesy singing, lullaby-esque melodies and "droning" bass, and progresses into what Prick's Jonathan Williams cited as the album's "most violently lashing-out minute". "Hooks & Splinters" is about making art and internal conflict between creation and destruction.

"Gutter" is a spoken word piece that leads into "Autopsy Song", in which Shamaya becomes aware of her fears and turns her insecurities and sense of defeat into a strength. The song is the second in a series beginning with "Emtee" on Sevas Tra, and is followed by "Perfectly Flawed" on The Ascension (2007) and "Ur a Wmn Now" on Smash the Control Machine (2009). "Suicide Trees" was inspired by the thirteenth canto in Dante Alighieri's Inferno, where people who commit suicide are turned into trees. Shamaya said the song decipts a "dark forest, filled with thoughts of death" she escaped through "the power of art". The song incorporates "neo-tribal drumming" and progresses as a "spacey" monologue for six minutes before culminating in a "requisite sonic explosion", according to Chuck Campbell of the Knoxville News Sentinel. Shamaya viewed "Nein" as the most "different" song on House of Secrets, citing its arrangements and vocalisation styles, and described "Self-Made" as a "heretical hymn, entirely dedicated to the cult of myself". Christa L. Titus of Billboard highlighted the latter song for its use of rapped vocals. The album's closing track, "Shattered Pieces", features ambient piano that Bryan Reesman of Metal Edge compared to Nine Inch Nails. Shamaya said the song represented "Pieces of me and my ideas. Everywhere."

== Release and promotion ==
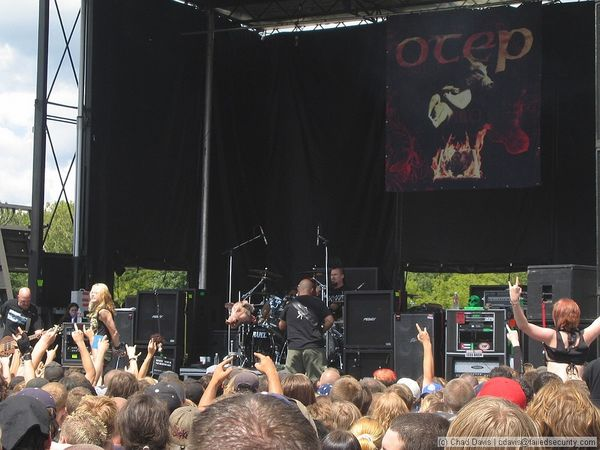
Otep performing in East Troy, Wisconsin, as part of the Ozzfest tour in August 2004

Otep announced House of Secrets on April 15, 2004, and released the album through Capitol Records on July 27, 2004. It was released as an Enhanced CD featuring the music video for "Warhead", poetry, drawings, photographs, and voter registration software (in co-operation with MTV's Rock the Vote campaign). Limited editions of the album were shipped with anaglyphic 3D artwork in a red and blue CD case that could be used to view the liner notes. The album debuted at number 93 on the US Billboard 200, surpassing Sevas Tra's peak at number 145, and at number 102 on the French Albums chart. "Warhead" and "Buried Alive" were released as singles from the album with music videos, which were posted online on May 4 and August 19, 2004, respectively. The "Warhead" video entered rotation on Fuse and MTV2's Headbangers Ball, with the latter later ranking amongst the best music videos of 2004.

Prior to touring in support of House of Secrets, Otep recruited guitarist Lee Rios and drummer Doug Pellerin. From July 10 to September 4, 2004, Otep performed on the second stage of Ozzfest, marking their third appearance at the festival. The band had turned down an offer to appear the previous year to focus on writing. During the tour, Shamaya and McGuire hosted a radio program for XM Satellite Radio called The Front Line and conducted interviews with attendees, artists, and staff. The band then joined the Metal Movement Tour (2004) with Kittie and Crisis. Rios left Otep following the tour and was replaced by Scotty CH in January 2005. From January 29 to March 15, 2005, Otep headlined the Alliance of Defiance tour with American Head Charge, Bloodsimple, Candiria, and The Autumn Offering, after which they embarked on another headlining tour, Mouth of Madness, with Gizmachi, Devil Inside, Daysend and Manntis from May 12 to June 30, 2005.

== Critical reception ==
Professional ratings
Review scores
Source	Rating
AllMusic	3.5/5 stars
Blender	2/5 stars
Calgary Herald	3.5/5 stars
Drum!	4.5/5 stars
The Encyclopedia of Popular Music	3/5 stars
The Gazette	2.5/5 stars
Knoxville News Sentinel	3/5 stars
The Province	2.5/5 stars
Salt Lake City Weekly	4/5 stars

House of Secrets received mixed reviews from music critics. Titus of Billboard called the album "terrifying" and said it brimmed "with sounds that can warp the psyche." Jon Hobson of Tucson Weekly praised the album for being "more frightening" than Sevas Tra and remarked that it was "so aggressive, angry and loud that it will blow the mind of those who dare listen". Mike Usinger of The Georgia Straight praised the "relentlessly captivating" album's themes and Shamaya's performance and considered it to be one of the best of 2004. Phil Freeman of the Cleveland Scene said the album showed Shamaya had "actually developed a style and a vision", whilst Rebecca Vernon of Salt Lake City Weekly described her as "effortlessly encompassing the roles of orator, poet, preacher and exorcist". Hobson and a writer for Drum! both highlighted Jordison's drumming on the album, particularly his performance on "Hooks & Splinters", which the former cited as a demonstration of the "creativity and mastery of his art". SLUG's John Forgach likewise praised Jordison's drumming but believed the rest of the album's instrumentation fell short of expectations set by it.

Kelefa Sanneh of The New York Times described the album as "appealing mishmash of over-the-top goth imagery (is there any other kind?) and furious dynamic shifts" and highlighted the album's presentation of abuse, though felt Otep did not "[take] care to avoid the ridiculous". Heath McCoy of Calgary Herald felt that the album's "demented rage" was overwrought to the point of comedic effect, but said "Otep's attack is so savage it drives the plot home." James Christopher Monger of AllMusic was less impressed, describing the album as "mediocre at best" and critiquing its "tedious" soundscapes and "predictable" riffs. Mark LePage of The Gazette said the album was "too heavy on the portenous whispering and not enough on the ballistic vengeance". Forgach felt the lyrics quickly became stale with their "self-loathing". Len Righi of The Morning Call described them as overly nihilistic and off-putting for non-metal fans; Jill Mikkelson for Exclaim! said they were "way too dramatic and adolescent to stimulate anything but scorn" and dismissed the album as being "little more than another Ozzfest headliner." PopMatters critic Adrien Begrand derided the album as being nothing more than "a shameless Slipknot clone" and "a tale of sound and fury, signifying zilch".

House of Secrets was ranked tenth on Tucson Weekly's year-end list of the best metal albums of 2004. Jinjer vocalist Tatiana Shmayluk cited the album as a significant inspiration.

== Track listing ==
All tracks are written by Otep Shamaya and Greg Wells, except where noted.

No.	Title	Writer(s)	Length
1.	"Requiem"		2:40
2.	"Warhead"	Otep Shamaya; Jason McGuire	3:29
3.	"Buried Alive"	Shamaya; Rob Patterson; Greg Wells	3:42
4.	"Sepsis"	Shamaya; McGuire	3:29
5.	"House of Secrets"		4:02
6.	"Hooks & Splinters"	Shamaya; McGuire; Wells	3:33
7.	"Gutter"	Shamaya	1:02
8.	"Autopsy Song"		3:42
9.	"Suicide Trees"		6:26
10.	"Nein"	Shamaya; Patterson; Wells	4:13
11.	"Self-Made"		3:40
12.	"Shattered Pieces"		4:11
Total length:			44:21

== Personnel ==
Personnel adapted from the liner notes of House of Secrets.

Musicians
- Otep Shamaya – vocals, bass drum, didgeridoo, cymbal scrapes (1)
- Jason "eViL J" McGuire – bass guitar, back up vocals (3), guitar (4, 5)
- Rob Patterson – guitar (2, 3, 10)
- Greg Wells – metal strips (1), steel drums (1), sound design (1, 9, 12), guitar (4–6, 8–12), celeste (5), drums (5, 8, 9), percussion (10), piano (12)
- Joey Jordison – drums (2, 3, 4, 6, 10, 11)

Artwork

- P. R. Brown – art direction, design, photography
Production
- Greg Wells – production, mixing, engineering
- Brian Scheuble – engineering
- Dan Beeston – assistant engineer
- Monique Mizrahi – assistant engineer
- Howie Weinberg – mastering
- Roger Lian – mastering
- Otep Shamaya – executive producer

== Charts ==
Chart (2004)	Peak position
French Albums (SNEP)	102
US Billboard 200	93

== Bibliography ==
- Andrews, Rob (October 2004). "Otep: A Touch of Mystery". Hit Parader. No. 480. Hit Parader Publications, Inc. p. 26. ISSN 0162-0266.
- Bianco, Paolo (September 15, 2004). "Otep: La Poetessa del Dolore" [The Poetess of Pain]. Metal Shock (in Italian). No. 414. pp. 18–21. OCLC 955301070.
- Campbell, Chuck (August 6, 2004). "Music: New on CD". Knoxville News-Sentinel (Preview). p. 10. OCLC 12008657 – via newspapers.com.
- Catucci, Nick (August 2004). "The Guide: New Releases". Blender. No. 28. Dennis Publishing. pp. 137–138. ISSN 1534-0554 – via Internet Archive.
- Derdeyn, Stuart (July 27, 2004). "Quick Spins". The Province. p. B5. ISSN 0839-3311. ProQuest 269396660.
- Gloss, Megan (October 21, 2004). "Otep Moves Through Quad Cities". Telegraph-Herald (River Stages). p. 3. ISSN 1041-293X.
- Larkin, Colin, ed. (2006). "Otep". Encyclopedia of Popular Music. Vol. 6 (4th ed.). MUZE. p. 351. ISBN 978-0-19-531373-4 – via Internet Archive.
- LePage, Mark (August 26, 2004). "New Music". The Gazette. Montreal. p. D2. ISSN 0384-1294. ProQuest 434079955.
- Mafi, Eugene (December 2009). "Antiwar Songs in the Wake of the War on Terror". The Rhetorical Use of Invective and Scapegoating in Early Antiwar Songs of Dissensus Against the War in Iraq (Bachelor of Arts thesis). California State University. pp. 89–97. ISBN 978-1-109-66985-5. ProQuest 305182629.
- McCoy, Heath (September 14, 2004). "Savage attack drives Otep". Calgary Herald. p. E5. ISSN 0828-1815 – via newspapers.com.
- Reesman, Brian (October 2004). "Otep: Roaring Against the Machine". Metal Edge. Vol. 50, no. 6. Dorchester Media, LLC. pp. 96–99. ISSN 1068-2872 – via Internet Archive.
- Righi, Len (February 12, 2005). "Disc Reviews". The Morning Call. p. D6. ISSN 2641-3825 – via newspapers.com.
- Sciarretto, Amy (June 21, 2004). "Loud Rock". CMJ New Music Report. No. 869. p. 19. ISSN 0890-0795.
- Sculley, Alan (May 19, 2005). "Don't ask, don't tell". Daily Herald (UV). p. 17. ISSN 0891-2777 – via newspapers.com.
- Sculley, Alan (May 5, 2007). "Otep recaptures early drive on new album". Asbury Park Press. p. G3. OCLC 16894042 – via newspapers.com.
- Woodward, Jeff (January–February 2009). "Otep". Macabre Cadaver. No. 6. p. 32. ISSN 1943-9296 – via Internet Archive.
- de Yampert, Rick (March 4, 2005). "Goth-thrash band Otep invades". The Daytona Beach News-Journal. p. 6E – via newspapers.com.
