= Hydra (Otep album) =

Studio album by Otep
- Released: January 22, 2013
- Genre: Alternative metal, nu metal
- Length: 72:37
- Label: Victory
- Producer: Ulrich Wild

Otep chronology
Atavist (2011)	Hydra (2013)	Generation Doom (2016)

Singles from Hydra
- 1. "Apex Predator" Released: January 15, 2013

Hydra is the sixth studio album by the heavy metal band Otep. It was released in 2013 on Victory Records. Hydra is a concept album. This is their only album to feature drum programming as opposed to live drums. It is the band's last album on Victory, as they completed their three-album contract with this record.

== Background ==
Hydra is a concept album, based on a novel Otep Shamaya was working on from two years earlier, called None Shall Sleep. Otep explained the album's concept in a series of postings to Facebook:

"It's a concept album about a girl corrupted by the world, corrugated by evil, ripped away from the golden, molten elixir of creativity, and abandoned on the placid, jagged rocks of a cruel and barbaric island where the rats poison themselves. This is a story of her personal alchemy of theophagy, revenge and righteousness. Her rise from the smoldering ash as a bruise that never heals transmuting, therianthropic, to the infinite, still-born messiah, a vigilante serial assassin, codename: Hydra."

== Recording ==
The album was produced by Ulrich Wild, who had produced the band's previous two albums, Smash The Control Machine and Atavist.

Otep's writing was based on the character of Hydra themselves, and attempted to write with the mindset of the character; “I realized I was not writing this record,” she explained in an interview to Albuquerque Journal. “Hydra was writing this record. I thought, ‘Why not hand it over to her?’ It was a difficult process to do that, living as that character … I wanted to do that, to live through this person, feel things that she was writing.” In several interviews for the album, Otep spoke about the album's songs in the third person, crediting "Hydra" for writing the songs.

The album was written in four weeks, with Otep going in to record the album "12 hours a day, six days a week and four hours on Sunday" over a period of sixteen weeks.

Otep recalled the creation of the album as "beautiful madness. I allowed the personality of the creature I've created to take hold. I can see with her eyes, double vision, the strength in my own, the terror and envy and hate with hers. I can taste her cold soul forming an armor around mine. She is me, or could be, if I allowed it, if I didn't have art to release this demon of fire and iron from me. Hydra. Hydra. Hydra." She compared the album to her second album, House Of Secrets; "It's theater of the mind, it's a journey, a story."

== Songs ==
"HYDRA is essentially an anti-hero; she only wants to destroy the corrupted. She doesn’t believe anyone else has the right to do what she does. She feels all these other killers do it for the wrong reasons, they cheapen the holy sanctity of her “cleansing”. Once her targets have been neutralized, however, she is overcome by this biting emptiness that forces her to seek another prey. Fortunately, the world is ripe with vermin and she has a never-ending supply."

— Otep describing the character of "Hydra".

=== Blowtorch Nightlight ===
Otep described the song as Hydra's attempt to "create an anthem based on her search for the one who made her and to give a glimpse of the processes that created and summoned this dark thing that now inhabits her."

=== Voyeur ===
"Voyeur" is a largely spoken word song where an animal abuser who recorded himself torturing animals is tortured and murdered. Otep called the song "My most scariest ever and I’m happy about that." The song was inspired by a video Otep saw online about a young man in Eastern Europe videoing himself hurting animals and the activist group that anonymously found him and turned him over to the authorities.

=== Apex Predator ===
The storyline of "Apex Predator" was explained by Otep in an interview to New Transcendence:

"HYDRA has fallen in love with one of her victims and is enamored by this person’s defiance and strength. The woman that she has captured is just like her in many ways and as the story progresses, HYDRA begins to question whether this person exists at all. She wonders if this is just a figment and all of this is happening inside her mind, she can’t be sure, but then suddenly she finds herself inside the cell where the victim was, hurt just like her victim was, and the cycle returns and recoils infinitum."

The song was released as the album's only single from Hydra on January 15, 2013. A music video, directed by P.R. Brown, was also released for the song on February 25, 2013. It was filmed at an abandoned hospital in California, and follows the story of the lyrics. The music video was banned by YouTube due to scenes of simulated sex between two girls, but has since been reversed, albeit it is under age restrictions.

== Release and promotion ==
In the promotions of the album, Otep stated that this would be her final album. The reasons for this were her disillusionment of the music industry at the time, the declining popularity of extreme metal, and the issue of music piracy. She was particularly incensed by the album being leaked onto YouTube by someone who had an advance copy of the album. She did leave the possibility open for returning to making music again.

To promote the album, Otep embarked on the "Seduce and Destroy" Tour for seven weeks starting in March 2013.

== Reception ==
Hydra received mixed reviews from critics.

Professional ratings
Review scores
Source	Rating
About.com	2/5 stars
AllMusic	3.5/5 stars
Exclaim!	7/10
Metal Storm	2.5/10
Outburn	7/10
PopMatters	5/10

== Track listing ==
No.	Title	Length
1.	"Rising"	2:28
2.	"Blowtorch Nightlight"	5:11
3.	"Seduce & Destroy"	6:28
4.	"Crush"	4:36
5.	"Hematopia"	2:32
6.	"Necromantic"	2:06
7.	"Quarantine"	3:07
8.	"Voyeur"	5:52
9.	"Apex Predator"	5:23
10.	"Feral Game"	5:17
11.	"Livestock"	3:18
12.	"Hag"	3:31
13.	"Theophagy" (ends at 6:30, rest is silence)	22:48
Total length:		72:37

== Personnel ==
Otep

- Otep Shamaya – vocals, voices
- Aristotle – guitar, programming
- Collyn McCoy – bass guitar

Technical staff

- Joey James – artwork, artist
- Jason Link – layout
- Mike Kato – management
- Raidar – assistant
- Aristotle – engineering
- Tristan Wallace – programming, engineering
- Otep Shamaya – art direction, executive production
- Ulrich Wild – programming, production, engineering, mastering, mixing

== Charts ==
Chart (2013)	Peak position
Billboard 200	133
Billboard Top Hard Rock Albums	9
Billboard Top Independent Albums	22
Billboard Top Rock Albums	39
