= Billy Morrison =

British guitarist (born 1969)

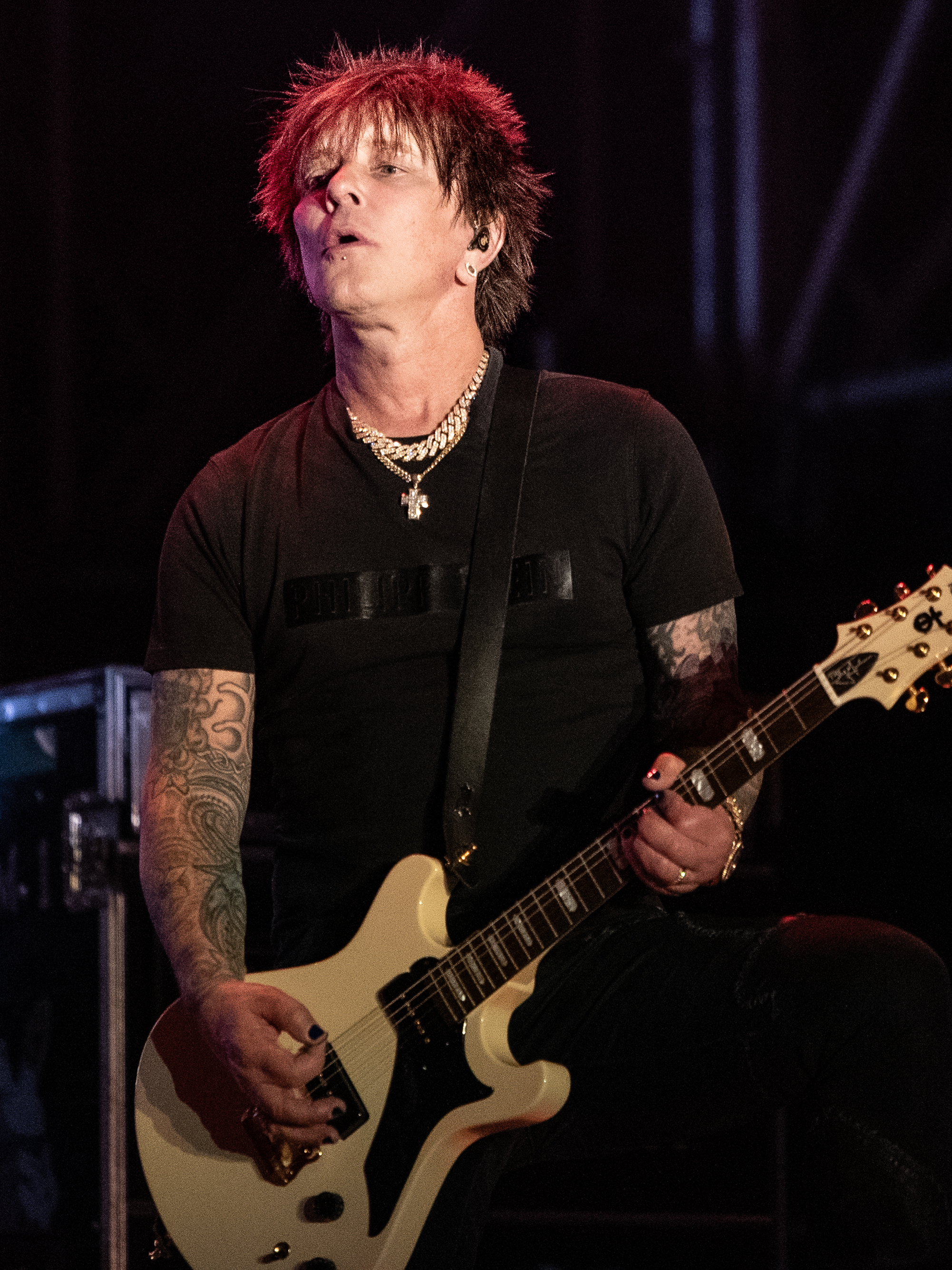
- Morrison in 2025

Background information
- Born: 9 February 1969 (age 57)
- Origin: Los Angeles, California, U.S.
- Genres: Punk rock; alternative rock; hard rock
- Occupations: Musician; songwriter
- Instruments: Guitar; vocals
- Years active: 1986–present
- Member of: Circus Diablo; Royal Machines; Billy Idol
- Formerly of: Camp Freddy; The Cult
- Website: billymorrisonart.com

Billy Morrison (born 9 February 1969) is a British musician who plays guitar with Billy Idol, performs with the Los Angeles-based cover band Royal Machines, and fronts the hard rock act Circus Diablo. He was previously a member of Camp Freddy. He has also toured with The Cult.

== Early life and career ==
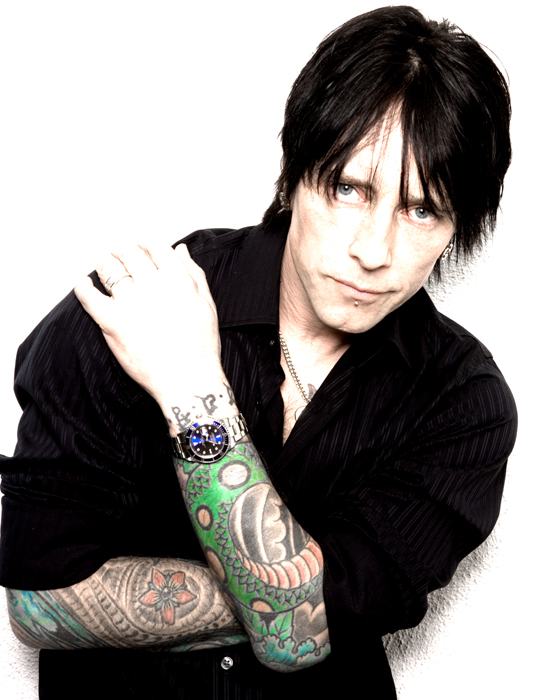
Morrison earlier in his career

Morrison was born in the UK and is an only child. Early in his career, he was a member of the indie rock band Into a Circle. Consistent abuse of drugs led to a period of inactivity until he recovered and formed Stimulator in 1995. The band signed a recording contract with Geffen Records and recorded an album, but the company never released it. In 2008, Morrison released the album under his own name, stating "When I read about Tunecore, and when the business started to lend itself to home releases – the indie, DIY approach – I wanted to finally release it. All the hard copies sold out, and it still does good business on iTunes. I would call that a success."

=== The Cult (2001) ===
In 2001, at the request of Billy Duffy, Morrison joined The Cult as the band's bass player. Although he primarily plays rhythm guitar, he enjoyed the idea of playing bass for such a seminal rock band. He toured with The Cult for more than a year, which included playing shows in the UK and Japan and touring with Aerosmith in the U.S.

During a subsequent period of inactivity for The Cult, Morrison joined forces with Pitchshifter frontman J.S. Clayden and formed Doheny. However, no material from Doheny was released commercially. In 2009, Morrison talked about the experience in an interview. "We wrote some songs together, had a laugh and put a lineup together, but I think Doheny suffered from being over-rehearsed and under-funded. We played every note perfectly and had no money to get out on the road and get out of L.A. That was it. But some great songs came out of those years. We should release them."

=== Camp Freddy (2002) ===
In 2002, Morrison joined forces with Dave Navarro, Matt Sorum, Donovan Leitch and Scott Ford to form Camp Freddy. In addition to his performances with the band, Morrison hosted a radio show, Camp Freddy Radio, on Los Angeles–based Indie 103.1 for three years with Navarro and Leitch.

Morrison began acting in 2005 and delivered his first on-screen performance in the independent movie Tripping Forward as drug dealer Sweaty Steve. Since then, he has made other independent films, including Evilution, Basement Jack and K-11 (directed by Jules Stewart). He has described the acting process as "something I would love to do more of", and he continues to develop TV and film projects.

=== Circus Diablo (2006) ===
In 2006, Morrison formed Circus Diablo with fellow The Cult guitarist Billy Duffy and former Fuel frontman Brett Scallions on bass guitar. The lineup was completed by former The Almighty front man Ricky Warwick and Slunt drummer Charles Ruggiero. The band subsequently added former Korn guitarist Rob Patterson and singer-songwriter Patrick Cornell to its lineup. The band's first album released in July 2007, and the first single, "Loaded", reached number 29 on the Active Rock Chart. For a time, the video for the song was the most viewed music video on YouTube, with more than 1,000,000 hits.

== Later career ==
In March 2009, Morrison talked about his plans for the future:

I have a couple of exciting things happening later in the year that will become apparent. So, I intend to release some music around those things – either another Diablo album or some solo stuff, whatever. So, writing and recording is on the menu for me. I also hope to close a couple of things in the TV and film worlds that I have been concentrating on – and, again, once things are real, I'll dish the details. Camp Freddy has some shows lined up, which we'll announce nearer the time, and the band also has plans for some 'extracurricular activities'. So, I suppose you could say that 2009 holds a lot of diverse possibilities for me.

=== Billy Idol (2010) ===
In March 2010, Morrison joined Billy Idol's band, stating:

I am happy to finally be able to tell you that I will be touring in 2010 with Billy Idol. I joined the line up at the beginning of the year and have been deep in rehearsals for a few weeks now. The twin guitars of Steve Stevens and myself sound amazing on the Idol material, and I am excited to get out there and start playing shows. My friend Jeremy Colson is behind the kit, and the astute among you will remember that I have worked with Jeremy before in Circus Diablo.

In addition to spending most of 2010 on the road with Billy Idol, including shows in Russia, Greece, Switzerland, Germany, England and most of Eastern Europe, Morrison landed a guest-starring role in the Showtime television series Californication. Titled "Lawyers, Guns and Money", the episode aired on 11 February 2011, with Morrison playing a tattooist.

Morrison toured with Billy Idol again in 2014. He developed a strong writing partnership with Stevens, and the two guitarists continue to write together. He co-wrote the majority of the Kings & Queens of the Underground Billy Idol album, released in October 2014, with Stevens and Idol.

=== Gibson Les Paul Billy Morrison Signature Guitar (2011) ===
The Gibson Les Paul Billy Morrison signature model guitar was released in January 2011 at the NAMM Show. Designed by Morrison, the guitar is one of the few Les Paul guitars to feature a white headstock. Morrison also contributed to a video blog on the Gibson website.

=== Royal Machines (2014) ===
In January 2014, Camp Freddy underwent a transformation in both name and lineup, with Morrison, Navarro, Chaney, and Leitch forming a new band called Royal Machines with Sugar Ray frontman Mark McGrath, and drummer Josh Freese of Devo, The Vandals and A Perfect Circle. Morrison released the following statement on his website:

Well, after ten years as Camp Freddy, it was time to move on, re-tool and do it all over again! We're moving forward with Royal Machines – myself, Dave Navarro, Donovan Leitch, Josh Freese, Mark McGrath and Chris Chaney – same fun shows, same great guest appearances, and hopefully another ten years of mad, crazy, one-of-a-kind shows. We performed three songs at Bitesize TV last weekend, and the result of that will be aired soon – yes, I'll post the broadcast details when we have them. But it was great to see some of you lot show up and join in the evening, and it was a good feeling to play as Royal Machines for the first time. Obviously, all the sites and social media will get up and running as time goes on, but you can follow us ON TWITTER and like our page ON FACEBOOK – the website will be up soon.

=== God Shaped Hole (2015) ===
With Billy Idol drummer Erik Eldenius, Morrison wrote and released his second full solo album, God Shaped Hole, in 2015. The album features five original songs and five cover songs. The song "Gods" was written by Morrison and Ozzy Osbourne, who also sang the track. The song has been praised as a "classic Ozzy Osbourne ballad" and is on rotation on Sirius XM's "Ozzy's Boneyard" channel. A longtime friend of Morrison, Osbourne told Guitar World, "So we got together, worked up a couple of melody lines and it literally took us half an hour to write." Morrison also co-hosts a monthly talk show called "Ozzy Speaks" on Sirius with Osbourne.

=== Fine art (since 2015) ===
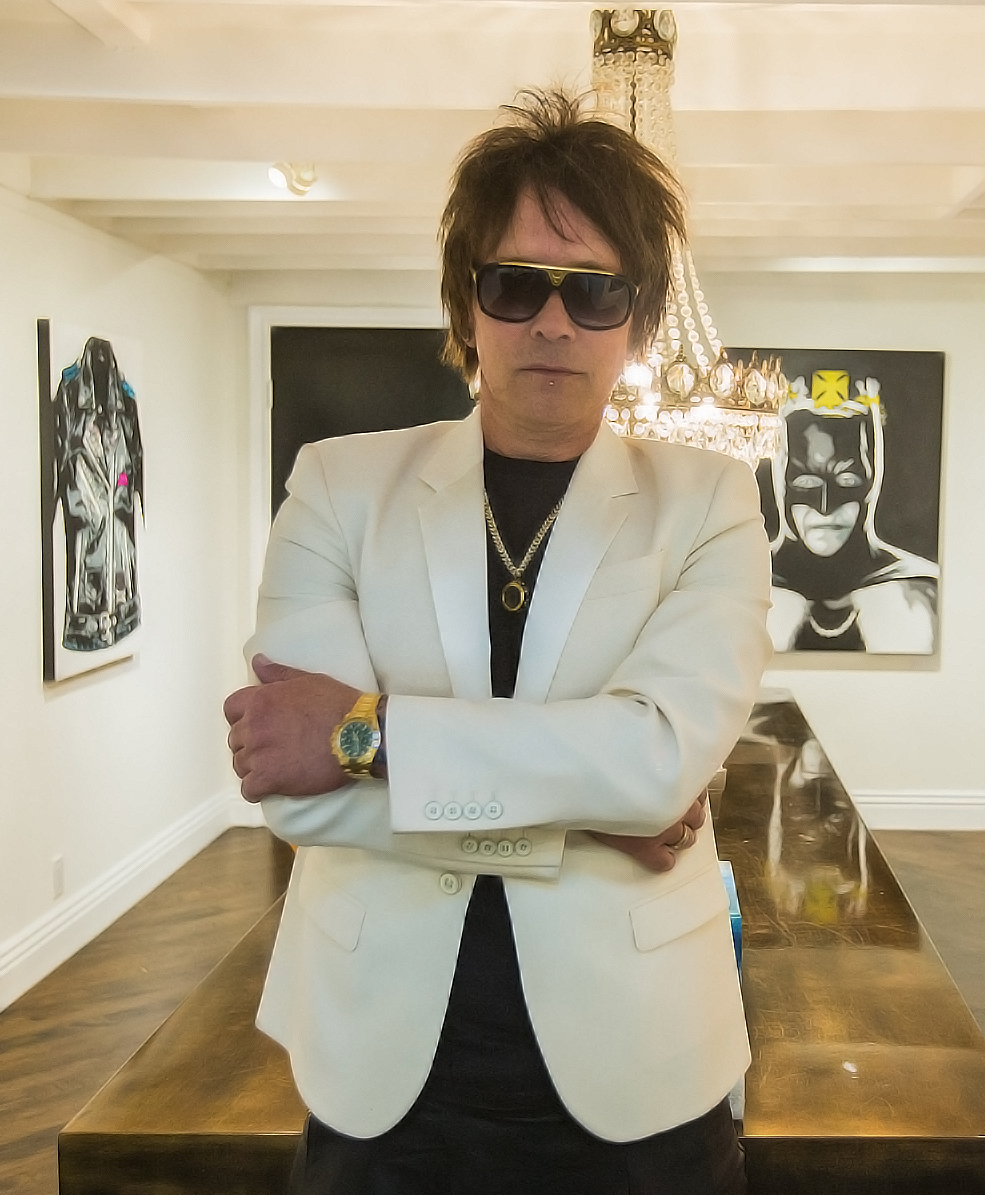
Morrison at an art show

As a longtime collector of contemporary art, Morrison owns pieces by Andy Warhol, Jean Michel Basquiat, Damien Hirst, Keith Haring and many others. Beginning in 2013, Morrison added painting to his list of creative accomplishments, culminating in four sold out art shows in the past five years. His work has earned the attention of serious art collectors, and he has collaborated on works with Lincoln Townley, Plastic Jesus and RISK. A painting from his Butterfly series hangs in the U.S. Capitol.

=== The Morrison Project (2024) ===
Morrison released his third solo album, The Morrison Project, in 2024. The album featured Morrison's single "Crack Cocaine" (feat. Ozzy Osbourne and Steve Stevens) which peaked at No. 2 on Billboard's Mainstream Rock Chart. The single received a nomination at the 2024 Hollywood Independent Music Awards in the Rock category.

== Discography ==
=== Albums ===
- Stimulator (2008)
- God Shaped Hole (2015)
- The Morrison Project (2024)
- Hollow (2026)

=== Singles ===
| Title | Year | Peak chart positions | | | Album |
| Title | Year | US Airplay | US Main. | US Hard Rock | Album |
|---|---|---|---|---|---|
| "Drowning" | 2024 | — | — | — | The Morrison Project |
| "Crack Cocaine" (feat. Ozzy Osbourne and Steve Stevens) | 2024 | 8 | 2 | 19 | The Morrison Project |
| "Gods of Rock n Roll" (feat. Ozzy Osbourne) | 2025 | 19 | 8 | 12 | Non-album singles |
| "Becoming" (feat. Sully Erna and Nuno Bettencourt) | 2026 | — | 19 | — | Hollow |
| "Hollow" | 2026 | — | — | — | Hollow |
| "Never Gonna Change" (feat. Dexter Holland) | 2026 | — | — | — | Hollow |
| "Take Me As I Am" | 2026 | — | 35 | — | Hollow |

== Music videos ==
List of music videos, with year of release and video title
| Song | Year | Director(s) |
|---|---|---|
| "Drowning" | 2024 | Unknown |
| "Crack Cocaine" | 2024 | Ivo Raza |
| "It's Come To This" | 2024 | Ivo Raza |
| "Chasing Shadows" | 2024 | Unknown |
| "Incite the Watch" | 2024 | Brett Boggs |
| "Just Like a Movie" | 2024 | Unknown |
| "Phenomenon" | 2024 | Dale "Rage" Resteghini |
| "Gods of Rock n Roll" | 2025 | Ivo Raza |
| "Becoming" | 2026 | Ivo Raza |
| "Never Gonna Change" | 2026 | Mike Savage |
| "Take Me As I Am" | 2026 | Ivo Raza |

== Filmography ==
- Tripping Forward (2006)
- Basement Jack (2008)
- Evilution (2008)
- The Heart Is a Drum Machine (2009)
- The Perfect Age of Rock 'n' Roll (2009)
- Californication – Episode: "Lawyers, Guns and Money" (2011)
- K-11 (2012)
- Massacre (2015)
- Len and Company (2015)
- Reboot Camp (2020)
- The Necropolitan (TBA)
