= Destrophy =

American alternative metal band

- Origin: Iowa City, Iowa, United States
- Genres: Alternative metal heavy metal
- Years active: 1992–present
- Labels: Inner Light Records, Victory Records
- Members: Ari Mihalopoulos; Phil Tschechaniuk; Ryan Berrier; Kevin Smith
- Past members: Erik Tisinger; Joe Fox; Bruce Swink
- Website: destrophy.com

Destrophy is an American alternative metal band from Des Moines, Iowa, formed in 1992 by singer, songwriter, guitarist, and producer Ari (Aristotle Mihalopoulos). The band has released two studio albums and one EP on Inner Light Records and are currently signed with Victory Records releasing two studio albums and three singles with the label.

Destrophy is currently managed world-wide by the Inner Light Agency, and have performed with artists such as OTEP, Type O Negative, Drowning Pool, Taproot, Korn, Disturbed, Five Finger Death Punch, Stone Temple Pilots, Saliva, Avenged Sevenfold, Papa Roach, Soilwork, and Buckcherry, among others. The band's MySpace, Facebook and Inner Light Agency portfolio pages keep an accurate account of their current tours and shows.

The song Reconnect from their 2009 self-titled Victory Records debut was used by TNA Wrestler Jesse Neal as his entrance theme song. Jesse Neal is featured in the music video for the song as well.

For October and November 2011 tour dates, some Destrophy members perform as the live backing band for OTEP as a supporting act along with Earth Crisis, for Cavalera Conspiracy who are on the North American stint of their current tour.

== History ==
=== 1994- 1999: formation ===
Destrophy began as a project created by Ari while attending high school in the 1990s in Iowa City, Iowa. The band's original line-up consisted of Ari and high school classmates Stuart Urban, Heath Meyer and John Sales, and performed at talent shows and local venues.

=== 2002 - 2004: Chrysalis ===
In 2003, Destrophy worked with Curt Smith as part of their management team and won the Rock 108 Battle of the Bands competition. March 2004 saw the official release of their first self-produced album, Chrysalis, on Inner Light Records. The 12-track album featured a cover of Send Me an Angel by Real Life and an extended version of Let It Go. The lead track, Let It Go, was featured on compilations and helped provide the band with exposure. A video for Why I Hate Goodbye (directed by Chad Calek) was released in 2004.

=== 2005 - 2006: Pray EP ===
The Pray five-song EP was recorded and produced by Ari and released in 2005 on Inner Light Records. The EP featured a cover of The Rolling Stones song "Paint It, Black". Destrophy released a video for the title track Pray (directed by Ben Hill) that same year. Ari and Tschechaniuk were soon joined by Joe Fox on drums, and guitarist Bruce Swink (ex-Downthesun and Stone Sour) for live shows and touring in support of the Pray release, as well as introducing new songs that would be featured on their next album.

=== 2007 - 2008: The Way Of Your World ===
In January 2007, the band signed a management deal with Damon Moreno at the Inner Light Agency (iLA). Bruce Swink would later step down as a guitarist in the band and join Moreno at iLA to aid in managing Destrophy and other promising artists. In February 2007, Ari an avid weight-lifter, suffered an umbilical hernia while weight training, forcing the band to go on hiatus for the first part of the year. Ari continued to write and record new music throughout the year. October 20, 2007 (a week before the Destrophy sophomore release) Ari performed with Kareem Salama at Wembley Arena in London opening for Sami Yusuf at A Concert for Peace in Darfur.

Ari returned state-side in time to release the band's second full-length album The Way Of Your World, which was released on Saturday October 27, 2007. The album featured new music as well as re-recorded versions of selected songs off both the Chrysalis and Pray EP. A video for This Is Not My Life (directed by Ben Hill) was released to help promote the album. In late 2007, Destrophy embarked upon a US tour in support of the new album throughout much of 2008.

=== 2009 - 2010: Victory Records, Destrophy ===
2009 saw Destrophy sign a multi-album deal with Victory Records (home of Emmure, Taproot, Ill Nino, and others). With a brand new record deal, the band released their eponymous major label debut on Tuesday October 27, 2009. The first single The Way Of Your World was released to radio stations nationwide and a video was also released to promote the album. While the single experienced plays on radio, streaming, and on-demand services, the video made it on to MTV2 and Fuse TV.

The album's second single Reconnect was licensed to TNA wrestler Jesse Neal as his entrance music. The official video for the single, features Jesse Neal himself. The live version of the song was featured on the VicTorV Live video podcast.

Destrophy's self-titled album was added to TouchTunes Interactive Networks, making the album available on jukeboxes in various clubs, bars, and restaurants.

Ari was featured on the June 2010 cover of the MAX Sports & Fitness magazine (published by Muscle and Strength), with a multi-page article on Ari's kettlebell training, as well as a discussion on Destrophy in the studio recording their latest release Cry Havoc.

=== 2011-present: Cry Havoc, OTEP ===
Victory Records released a sample of the song Closer prior to the release of the band's new album, Cry Havoc, which was released on Tuesday April 26, 2011. The album was produced by Ari except the song Still Bleeding which was produced by Ari and co-produced by Corey Lowery (of Eye Empire, ex-Stuck Mojo) who also performs guitar solos on Cry Havoc and Still Bleeding. Closer became the band's first radio single, accompanied by an official video release. Once again, the band's single experienced exposure on radio, streaming, and on-demand services with the video seeing frequent airplay on MTV2 and Fuse TV. The video was also featured on the VicTorV video podcast.

According to Ari, The phrase, "Cry Havoc" comes from Shakespeare's Julius Caesar, and at least for "our album basically means go kick some ass". The title track and much of the album was influenced by the Spartan stand at Thermopylae, "which to me is the perfect example of holding true to one's way of life at any cost".

Currently, Destrophy members Ari on guitar and Tisinger on guitar have been playing as the backing band for Otep Shamaya (OTEP) during the October and November 2011 tour dates.

== Band name ==
A Greek-history teacher introduced Ari to the word diastrophe (Greek meaning: something or someone who is not behaving as it should; to distort), which was Anglicized to Destrophy.

== Band members ==
Current members

- Ari Mihalopoulos – lead vocals, guitar, programming (1992–present)
- Phil Tschechaniuk – bass (2002–2011, 2021– present)
- Ryan Berrier – drums (2002–2004, 2021–present)
- Kevin Smith – guitar (2002–2004, 2021–present)

Past members

- Erik Tisinger – guitar (2010–2011)
- Bruce Swink – guitar (2005–2010)
- Joe Fox – drums (2005–2011)
- Heath Meyer – drums (1992–1999)
- Luke Smith – guitar (1994–2000)
- John Sales – bass (1992–1999)
- Rhys Jones – guitar (1993–1994)
- Stuart Urban – guitar (1992–1993)

== Discography ==
- Chrysalis (2004)
- Pray EP (2005)
- The Way Of Your World (2007)
- Destrophy (2009)
- Cry Havoc (2011)
- New Gods EP (2021)

== Singles ==
- Pray
- This Is Not My Life
- The Way Of Your World
- Reconnect
- Send in the Wolves
- We Are Alive
- Closer
- Dead Energy
- The New Violence
- Doomsday
- Army of Me
- God Damned
- Welcome Home
