= Sevas Tra =

Studio album by Otep
- Released: May 27, 2002
- Recorded: October 2001
- Studios: Record Plant (Hollywood); Studio Litho (Seattle)
- Genres: Nu metal; death metal; gothic metal
- Length: 61:06
- Label: Capitol
- Producer: Terry Date

Otep chronology
Jihad (2001)	Sevas Tra (2002)	House of Secrets (2004)

Singles from Sevas Tra
- 1. "Blood Pigs" Released: 2002

Sevas Tra (reversed: "art saves") is the debut studio album by American heavy metal band Otep, released on May 27, 2002, through Capitol Records. The band, then consisting of vocalist Otep Shamaya, guitarist Rob Patterson, bassist Jason "eViL J" McGuire and drummer Mark "Moke" Bistany, wrote the album in one month and recorded it with producer Terry Date at Studio Litho in Seattle in October 2001. Sevas Tra is a nu metal, death metal, and gothic metal album whose lyrics address topics including sexual abuse, incest, organized religion, survival, anger and vulnerability whilst referencing mythology and various ancient cultures.

Sevas Tra received mixed reviews from critics, who praised its songwriting and Shamaya's vocal performances but were divided on its lyrics and presentation. The album debuted at number 145 on the US Billboard 200 chart and number 86 on the UK Albums Chart. To promote the album, Otep filmed a music video for "Blood Pigs" and joined the Ozzfest tours across Europe and the United States throughout 2002. Otep later reunited with Patterson and Bistany for the recording of their fourth album Smash the Control Machine (2009), and performed a concert celebrating the album's 20th anniversary in 2022.

== Background and recording ==
Otep was formed in Los Angeles in August 2000 by vocalist Otep Shamaya, who sought a new creative outlet beyond drawing and poetry and to bring her art to life through music. Shamaya became inspired to take up music after hanging around with various musicians in the late 1990s, despite her lack of formal training or experience; she wanted to pursue an aggressive direction whilst working with musicians who had a mixture of influences. After finding a manager and searching for some musicians, Otep settled on an initial lineup with bassist Jason "eViL J" McGuire, guitarists Traver Marsh and Dave "Spooky" Aguilera and drummer Mark "Moke" Bistany and performed their first show in November 2000. Record labels had begun courting Otep by the time of their fourth show in February 2001, and the band were offered a slot on the Ozzfest tour after Jack and Sharon Osbourne saw the band open for Cold at the Roxy Theatre in March. In April 2001, the band signed with Capitol Records on the strength of their live performance, after only eight shows and without a demo. Following the release of Otep's debut extended play (EP) Jihad (2001) (Note: Retitled Otep for its European release due to the September 11 attacks.) and performances on Ozzfest, Marsh and Aguilera were fired in July 2001 due to creative differences and were replaced by Rob Patterson, whom had briefly been part of Otep's initial line-up.

Otep wrote and recorded Sevas Tra in the span of two months. Shamaya said she "wanted to get in there and write it, get it recorded and get home", and believed the short creative window made Otep more confident and closer as a band. The band wrote the album in September 2001, during which time they were working six days and twelve-hours per week. They went in with no fixed ideas, and conceived songs starting with either their music or lyrics; each member would come up with their own parts before coming together and working on arrangements. McGuire highlighted Otep's members backgrounds in jazz fusion, funk, and classical music as influences and felt the album's songwriting stemmed from them "[knowing] ourselves personally". Shamaya exclusively handled lyrics and vocals, and held the final say over "what works and what doesn't". When writing lyrics, she drew influences from authors including Charles Baudelaire and Jack Kerouac and books about Aincent Egyptian magic and other cultures; in an interview with Metal Edge, she expressed further interest in Greek and Roman mythology and Sumerian religion. Most of the songs from Jihad were reworked as Shamaya wanted them to be more aggressive and give Patterson "his own voice" on them; "The Lord is My Weapon" was renamed "Sacrilege".

Once writing was completed, Otep travelled to Seattle to begin recording Sevas Tra with producer Terry Date at Studio Litho in October 2001. Date first expressed interest in working with the band after seeing them perform at a private showcase for Capitol Records; Shamaya said they wanted to work with him as they "thought he would be the right person to find our distinctive sound". The first song Shamaya recorded vocals for was "Jonestown Tea", which she completed in one take following three attempts in a room lit by a single candle. Shamaya said she almost had an emotional breakdown recording the rest of the album following the song, but believed that the experience "might have helped in some aspects, that I know the things that were said and done on [the] record were real." Following additional recording and mixing sessions at the Record Plant in Hollywood in November 2001, Sevas Tra was completed in March 2002.

== Composition ==
Music critics categorized Sevas Tra as nu metal, death metal, and gothic metal. Shamaya disliked many of the labels attached to Otep and preferred to categorize the band as "art-core". Jason Bracelin of the Cleveland Scene likened the album to "Sylvia Plath fronting a death-metal band." Its songs are marked by raw guitars, rhythmic bass and drums utilizing double-bass, and aggressive vocals that alternate between various styles including growling, screaming, rapping, whispering, and spoken word. Shamaya's lyrics, which reflect her personal experiences and opinions, address topics including sexual abuse, incest, organized religion, survival, anger and vulnerability, and include references to mythology and aincent cultures. Though she wrote the lyrics in a non-specific way so that listeners could form their own meanings to the songs, Shamaya intended Sevas Tra to give people a sense of empowerment and inspire them to believe they can be something outside of society-dictated roles and identities. The album's title is an anagram for "art saves"; in an interview with Rag Magazine, Shamaya credited creating art with preventing her from hurting herself or others and allowing her to become the person they were today. The cover art of Sevas Tra, designed by Shamaya and P. R. Brown, presents a "grotesque" depiction of Otep intended to appear like a Hieronymus Bosch-style triptcyh and reflect its themes of "being reborn as your own creature from the things that are trying to destroy you".

"Blood Pigs" is about "betrayal and punishment". Sean Richardson of The Boston Phoenix remarked that the song was "as ferocious and ugly as commercial rock gets". "T.R.I.C." combines hip hop and death metal and features references to David and Goliath, Babylon, and Armageddon. "My Confession" sees Shamaya outline her insecurities before exploding into "purposeful anger and exudes strength", according to Amy Steele of The Boston Globe. "Sacreliege" and "Battle Ready" are both hip-hop influenced songs that attack organized religion. Shamaya viewed the latter as a call for "artistic solidarity"; Gil Kaufman of MTV News considered it an anthem for Otep's fanbase, the Shadow Soldiers. "Emtee" details abuse amidst eerie vocals and melodies. "Thots" is an improvised jam stemming from a beat played by Bistany similar in style to the Jihad track "Germ", over which Shamaya gives her thoughts on the perpetrators of the September 11 attacks and "people that do the same sort of attacks on a smaller scale on their own communities every day".

"Filthee" explores themes of isolation and trauma and references concepts of purity in the Bible; one of its lyrics sarcastically alludes to the Biblical figures of Delilah and Samson, from the Book of Judges. "Menocide" attacks the patriarchy and those who commit violence against women; the song begins with Shamaya criticizing "prostate gods" and later calls upon Lillith, Eve, Isis, Kali, and women from various cultures before ending it with a chant to "Kill Your Masters/Menocide". In its intro, Shamaya can be heard smashing her head into a door in the studio. "Jonestown Tea" is about Shamaya being sexually abused by her father, and refusing to be blamed and victimized after being abused. Shamaya details rape, murder, and incest through spoken word lyrics whilst Otep progresses through a "multipart metal maelstrom". The song originated during a jam session during one of Otep's rehearsals whilst the band were being courted by record labels, and was included on Sevas Tra after Shamaya observed people's shocked reactions to it. Sevas Tra ends with the hidden track "Brother", which sees Shamaya memorialize her brother, who died whilst serving in the United States Navy.

== Release and promotion ==
Sevas Tra was released through Capitol Records in the United Kingdom on May 27, 2002, and in the United States on June 18, 2002. The first 75,000 copies of the album were available as a limited edition tri-fold digipak. Upon release, the album debuted at number 86 on the UK Albums Chart and number 10 on the UK Rock & Metal Albums chart. In the United States, the album debuted at number 145 on the Billboard 200 chart and number 2 on the Heatseekers Albums chart. "Blood Pigs" was serviced to radio stations as the album's lead single; a music video for the song, which shows Otep performing it live, was posted to the band's website in May 2002. According to Shamaya, the video was meant to get people to understand the band "was really more about music than anything else". "Battle Ready" was featured in the soundtrack of the 2002 video game Transworld Snowboarding.

Otep toured Europe as part of the first and only Ozzfest tour of the continent from May 17 to June 7, 2002, (Note: The final six dates of the European Ozzfest tour (June 8–16, 2002) were cancelled.) before joining the United States Ozzfest tour from July 6 to September 8, 2002. Shamaya was the only female lead singer on the latter tour; she found the experience to be isolating, and felt audiences judged her appearance more than her music. She also struggled with the death of Drowning Pool vocalist Dave Williams, whom she was good friends with, midway through the tour on August 14, 2002. Following Ozzfest, Otep began working on their second second album House of Secrets (2004), with Bistany and Patterson leaving in the interim period; they later rejoined the band for the recording of their fourth album Smash the Control Machine (2009). Otep's eighth album, Kult 45 (2018) was recorded with the same equipment and gear used on Sevas Tra. In September 2022, Otep celebrated the album's 20th anniversary with a concert at the Whisky a Go Go in Los Angeles.

== Critical reception ==
Professional ratings
Review scores
Source	Rating
AllMusic	4/5 stars
Alternative Press	9/10
Blender	2/5 stars
Collector's Guide to Heavy Metal	5/10
The Encyclopedia of Popular Music	3/5 stars
In Music We Trust	C+
Playlouder	2.5/5 stars
Times & Transcript	2/4 stars
Winnipeg Sun	3/5 stars

Darren Ratner of Alternative Press called Sevas Tra a "well-mixed set of frenetic tunes" that would "dazzle fans of vengeful song". Exclaim!'s Amber Authier praised the album's lyrical and instrumental balance and highlighted Shamaya's storytelling in songs such as "Battle Ready" and "Possession". Steele of The Boston Globe praised the "meticulously crafted" nature of its songs whilst highlighting Shamaya's combination of "machismo and softness". Daryl Stredan of the Winnipeg Sun felt Shamaya's "unbelievable" vocals separated Otep from their contemporaries; Charles Spano of AllMusic remarked that she "wipes the slate clean of any preconceptions of how intense a female-fronted metal band could be". In Music We Trust's Alex Steininger considered Sevas Tra's musicianship to be competent but felt its appeal was limited to fans of nu metal and that others would find it "semi-stomach-able". Rob Kemp of Blender felt that Shamaya's "brauva performance" did not stop the album from being weighed down by her band's "unrelentingly monochromatic playing". Eric Lewis of the Times & Transcript found the album confusing and could not take its lyrics seriously. Though finding its rage to be genuine, Sarah Bee of Playlouder criticized the album for its perceived pretension and felt its messages were "lost in slews of flailing, vicious, sagging lyrics".

Kelefa Sanneh of The New York Times ranked Sevas Tra at number 5 on his list of "Favorite Alternative CDs of 2002". In 2007, Nik D'Andrea of the Miami News-Times called it "one of the densest, most disturbing debut albums in the history of metal". In a 2021 Alternative Press listicle, Ali Cooper praised the album's lyrical depth compared to other contemporary nu metal acts and its aversion to trends. Less favourably, David Perri, in The Collector's Guide to Heavy Metal: Volume 4: The '00s (2011), called it a "late to the trend nu-metal record, despite the intellectual pretention [sic]".

== Track listing ==
All lyrics are written by Otep Shamaya; all music is composed by Jason McGuire, Rob Patterson, and Mark Bistany, except where noted.

Sevas Tra track listing
No.	Title	Music	Length
1.	"Tortured"		1:39
2.	"Blood Pigs"		4:03
3.	"T.R.I.C."	Traver Marsh; Rob Patterson; Jason McGuire; Mark Bistany	3:05
4.	"My Confession"		5:31
5.	"Sacrilege"		4:09
6.	"Battle Ready"		4:21
7.	"Emtee"		3:58
8.	"Possession"	Marsh; Patterson; McGuire; Bistany	4:54
9.	"Thots"		4:09
10.	"Fillthee"	Dave Aguilera; Marsh; Patterson; McGuire; Bistany	3:36
11.	"Menocide"		4:51
12.	"Jonestown Tea"		9:47
13.	"Brother" (hidden track)		7:03
Total length:			61:06

Japanese bonus tracks
No.	Title	Length
13.	"Battle Ready" (DJ Higher Mix)	4:20
14.	"Brother"	7:03
Total length:		65:26

Notes

- "T.R.I.C." is an initialism of "The Revolution is Coming".

== Personnel ==
Personnel per liner notes.

Otep
- Otep Shamaya - vocals, backing vocals
- Rob Patterson - guitar, piano (7)
- Jason "eViL j" McGuire - bass, backing vocals (6)
- Mark "Moke" Bistany - drums

Artwork

- Otep Shamaya - illustrations, pomes, art direction
- P. R. Brown - art direction, jacket design, photography
- Wendy Dougan - art direction, booklet design
Production
- Terry Date - production, recording, mixing
- Martin Feveyear - Pro Tools engineer, additional engineering
- Dave Fisher - assistant engineer (at Studio Litho)
- Floyd Reitsman - assistant engineer (at Studio Litho)
- Anthony Kilhoffer - assistant engineer (at The Record Plant)
- Ted Jensen - mastering (at Sterling Sound)
- Otep Shamaya - executive producer
- Xen F. Lang III - executive producer

== Charts ==
Chart performance for Sevas Tra
Chart (2002)	Peak position
UK Albums (OCC)	86
UK Rock & Metal Albums (OCC)	10
US Billboard 200	145
US Heatseekers Albums (Billboard)	2

== Bibliography ==
- "Soft Voice With Hard Reality". Toazted.com (Podcast). 2002. Archived from the original (.mp3) on February 20, 2005.
- "New Releases: Albums" (PDF). Music Week. May 25, 2002. p. 36. ISSN 0265-1548 – via worldradiohistory.com.
- "The Billboard 200". Billboard. Vol. 114, no. 27. July 6, 2002. p. 63. ISSN 0006-2510.
- "Billboard Heatseekers". Billboard. Vol. 114, no. 27. July 6, 2002. p. 65. ISSN 0006-2510.
- Boyce, Kevin (June 10, 2002). "Loud Rock". CMJ New Music Report. Vol. 72, no. 766. p. 19. ISSN 0890-0795.
- Campagna, Cathy A. (August 2002). "Otep: Visciously Artistic". Metal Edge. Vol. 48, no. 4. Sterling/Macfadden Partnership. pp. 32–34. ISSN 1068-2872.
- Clifford-Napoleone, Amber R. (2015). "Everybody Knows". Queerness in Heavy Metal Music: Metal Bent. Routledge. p. 99. ISBN 9781317916550 – via Internet Archive.
- Forgach, John (August 2003). "Written in Blood". SLUG. No. 176. p. 16. OCLC 48819125 – via Internet Archive.
- Frampton, Scott (June 2002). "On the Verge: Otep". CMJ New Music Monthly. No. 102. p. 19. ISSN 1074-6978 – via worldradiohistory.com.
- Freeman, Phil (August 2002). "Otep: Art Saves, Metal Invests". Alternative Press. Vol. 17, no. 169. p. 35. ISSN 1065-1667.
- Hart, Gerry (June 3, 2002). "Points of Impact". CMJ New Music Report. Vol. 71, no. 765. p. 38. ISSN 0890-0795.
- Kemp, Rob (August 2002). "The Guide: New Releases". Blender. Vol. 1, no. 8. p. 120. ISSN 1534-0554 – via Internet Archive.
- Kosek, Jakub (2023). ""Rise, Rebel, Resist". Artystyczne manifestacje grupy Otep" ["Rise, Rebel, Resist". Artistic manifestations of the group Otep]. Przeglad Kulturoznawczy (in Polish). 3 (57): 279–292. doi:10.4467/20843860PK.23.020.18578. ISSN 1895-975X. ProQuest 2919796287.
- Larkin, Colin, ed. (2006). "Otep". Encyclopedia of Popular Music. Vol. 6 (4th ed.). MUZE. p. 351. ISBN 978-0-19-531373-4 – via Internet Archive.
- Larsson, Denis (June 2002). "Otep". Slavestate (in Swedish). No. 3. pp. 58–59. OCLC 186123808 – via Internet Archive.
- Leininger, Merrie (June 1, 2007). "Otep seeks to connect with people". Reno Gazette-Journal (Calendar). p. 13 – via newspapers.com.
- Lewis, Eric (August 3, 2002). "JXL remix does the king justice". Times & Transcript. p. G3 – via newspapers.com.
- Mayhew, Malcolm (September 6, 2002). "Tribute to a Friend". Fort Worth Star-Telegram (Star Time). p. 35 – via newspapers.com.
- Popoff, Martin; Perri, David (2011). The Collector's Guide to Heavy Metal: Volume 4: The '00s. Burlington, Ontario, Canada: Collector's Guide Publishing. p. 373. ISBN 9781-926592-20-6.
- Ratner, Darren (July 2002). "Music Reviews". Alternative Press. Vol. 17, no. 168. ISSN 1065-1667.
- Ratner, Darren (July 2002). "Self-Analysis with Vocalist Otep". Alternative Press. Vol. 17, no. 168. ISSN 1065-1667.
- Richardson, Sean (July 12, 2002). "State of the Art: Otep". The Boston Phoenix (8 Days a Week). p. 3. ISSN 0163-3015 – via Internet Archive.
- Riemenschneider, Chris (August 16, 2002). "Wanted: Women Who Rock Hard". Minnesota Star Tribune (Variety). p. E7. ISSN 0895-2825 – via newspapers.com.
- Steele, Amy (July 12, 2002). "CD Report". The Boston Globe. p. D14. ISSN 0743-1791 – via newspapers.com.
- Stredan, Daryl (July 5, 2002). "Discs". Winnipeg Sun. p. 23. ISSN 0711-3773 – via newspapers.com.
