= Circus Diablo =

American rock band

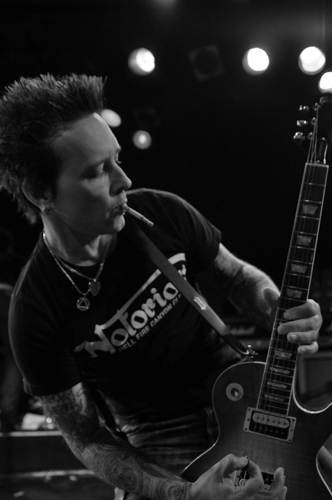
- Billy Morrison live in concert

Background information
- Origin: Los Angeles, California, U.S.
- Genres: Alternative rock
- Years active: 2006–present
- Label: Koch
- Members: Billy Morrison; Rob Patterson; Patrick Cornell; Charles Ruggiero
- Past members: Billy Duffy; Brett Scallions; Ricky Warwick; Matt Sorum; Jeremy Colson
- Website: circusdiablo.com

Circus Diablo is an American rock band formed in early 2006 by Billy Morrison (vocals), Billy Duffy (lead guitar) and Ricky Warwick (rhythm guitar). Fuel frontman Brett Scallions and Velvet Revolver drummer Matt Sorum subsequently joined the band on bass and drums, respectively. To date, Circus Diablo have released one studio album, entitled Circus Diablo.

The band's most recent touring incarnation featured Morrison alongside Rob Patterson (lead guitar), Patrick Cornell (bass) and Charles Ruggiero (drums). The band is not currently active, however, in a 2009 interview Morrison stated that "Circus Diablo is always together. We can get together and make music when we feel like it."

== History ==
Circus Diablo formed in 2006 with Camp Freddy guitarist Billy Morrison, The Cult's Billy Duffy, and Ricky Warwick – former member of The Almighty – meeting at Morrison's home and writing songs in his home studio. Morrison states that:

Circus Diablo just sort of evolved. Before the current line-up of The Cult went back out touring, Billy [Duffy] would come over and we'd just write songs together. We both knew Ricky from back in the day, so we called him up and invited him to join us. It was an organic thing. It wasn't done to put a band together at all. We wrote a bunch of songs and about five or six weeks later, we stepped back and went "wow, what should we do with this?"

The band enlisted Velvet Revolver drummer Matt Sorum to perform on the band's album, and the four-piece recorded at Sorum's Drac Studios. Former Fuel vocalist Brett Scallions joined on bass guitar for live performances, and Jeremy Colson – who had previously worked with Steve Vai joined as the band's live drummer.

On April 29, 2007, the band signed a record deal with Koch Records for the release of their eponymous debut album, which was released in July. Billy Duffy's fiancé Jen Mallini was the model for both the front and back of the cd cover. During the summer, the track "Loaded" featured prominently on the Sirius hard rock satellite station Octane, as well as terrestrial radio, and reached the top 20 slot according to Billboard. The album itself received a high critical praise by Allmusic's Jo-Ann Greene who exclaimed "The songs are simply superb, not a clinker in the bunch. If this platter doesn't top best album polls in another three decades, it's because the world as we know it is no more."

The band performed on a rotating slot during Ozzfest 2007, but dropped out due to two of the guitarists wives being pregnant and giving birth. In December 2007, the following appeared on the band's official website:

Billy Duffy (who co-wrote and recorded the album with Billy Morrison and Ricky Warwick) played the first few shows before moving back with The Cult. Brett Scallions became a first time dad, joined the remaining members of The Doors and filled the shoes of Jim Morrison in Riders On The Storm. Both Billy and Brett were influential parts in the Diablo story, and will be missed. The current V2.0 line up of Circus Diablo features ex Korn guitarist Rob Patterson (who traveled the US with Diablo during the summer Ozzfest tour) and session bassist / solo artist Patrick Cornell. "Both Billy and Brett were influential parts in the Diablo story, and will be missed.

Since then, the band has remained inactive. However, in March 2009, Billy Morrison stated:

Circus Diablo is always together. We can get together and make music when we feel like it [...] I love Billy [Duffy] and Ricky [Warwick] and Matt [Sorum], and the timing worked out: we wrote and recorded that shit really quickly. Then we toured with a different line-up, and what does that matter? We played the songs and had fun. Then I got busy, the tour support dried up, and that was the end of round one. Now I find myself wanting to record more music. So I began writing. And, of course, I am still very good friends with Billy and Matt. So the way I see it is this: write songs first, without worrying about what they're for, or where they're gonna' come out. If the managers put a "Diablo Album Number Two" deal together, maybe we'll do that. Who knows? All I care about is being creative and making some cool music, either solo or in a "band" environment.

== Band members ==
Current members

- Billy Morrison – vocals, rhythm guitar (2006–present)
- Rob Patterson – lead guitar (2007–present)
- Patrick Cornell – bass (2007–present)
- Charles Ruggiero – drums (2007–present)

Former members

- Billy Duffy – lead guitar (2006–2007)
- Brett Scallions – bass (2006–2007)
- Ricky Warwick – rhythm guitar (2006–2007)
- Matt Sorum – drums (2006)
- Jeremy Colson – drums (2007)

== Discography ==
- Circus Diablo (2007)
