= Smash the Control Machine =

Studio album by Otep
- Released: August 18, 2009
- Recorded: April–June 2009
- Studio: The Lair (Los Angeles)
- Genre: Nu metal, alternative metal
- Length: 64:39; 60:39 (w/o silence)
- Label: Victory
- Producer: Ulrich Wild

Otep chronology
The Ascension (2007)	Smash the Control Machine (2009)	Atavist (2011)

Singles from Smash the Control Machine
- 1. "Smash the Control Machine" Released: June 30, 2009; 2. "Rise, Rebel, Resist" Released: January 25, 2010

Smash the Control Machine is the fourth studio album from Otep. It was released on August 18, 2009.

The album shows a reunion of the band's Sevas Tra lineup. It is also the final album to feature long-time bassist Jason "eVil J" McGuire.

== Background ==
In April 2009, Otep signed with Victory Records.

The album is also the first to feature the Sevas Tra lineup of the band in seven years. "When I was told it was time to write a new album I reached out to [Rob and Moke]. At first, it was going to be just one song, but it was soon very clear that we couldn't stop what we started. Once we were back in the room together, it was if we were never apart."

The album's title is a quote taken from William S. Burroughs' Dead City Radio.

== Recording ==
It was produced by Ulrich Wild, who had worked in the past with Dethklok and Static-X. Wild and Otep worked in the studio "12 to 14 hours a day, 6 days a week." Unlike previous Otep albums, Smash the Control Machine was written and recorded at the same time; "writing in the mornings, recording in the evenings, scrutinizing in the afternoons". The album's recording process was livestreamed via Ustream. While it was originally done with the audio muted in order to prevent the album's songs from leaking, Otep eventually used it to do small in-studio shows before the band started touring. Recording lasted two months, and was finished at the end of June 2009.

== Songs ==
"The economic crisis is hitting every working family in this country. The album and its title track, 'Smash The Control Machine', will lay bare the greed and corruption that fostered this calamity, but will also focus on the undying spirit of the working class that always fights the good fight. The title is a line from a William S. Burroughs poem. It is my intention to create an album that serves every head of the hydra that is OTEP. From poetry, to politics, to shock and awe, to sex and righteousness, to standing up and fighting back. Like the mystical symbol of the Ouroboros (the sacred serpent swallowing its tail) all things will be brought back to circle."

— Otep describing the album and its themes.

"Rise, Rebel, Resist" discusses "human rights, civil rights, and about justice and fairness in [The US]". "Numb and Dumb" is a look at the apathy that infects the American soul and a provocation to destroy it." Otep wrote "Run For Cover" for the band's military fans. "When I was writing it, I was getting messages at the time from soldiers– supportive messages from soldiers in Iraq and Afghanistan. I was thinking heavily about them and how they all thank us for writing our music and speaking out when they can’t and how our music helps them when they’re out on patrol. And, I wanted to write a song that would get everyone pumped up enough to fight their own battles."

Two of the album's songs are thematic continuations from songs featured on Otep's prior albums. According to Otep, "Ur A Wmn Now" (stylised in all caps) is the final part of a sequence of songs starting with "Emtee" from Sevas Tra, and continuing with "Autopsy Song" from House of Secrets and "Perfectly Flawed" from The Ascension. Lyrically, the song "deals with the archaic and sometimes barbaric rites and rituals, that transition girls into women. It is a challenge to those social and cultural fossils and offers a rather common sense idea for what a real woman is: someone, who has accepted the responsibility of becoming their own person and with it, all the struggles, sacrifices, and successes." Koichi Fukada of Static-X and Emilie Autumn contributed piano and violin to the song, respectively. Otep has described "Where The River Ends" as a sequel to "Jonestown Tea" (from Sevas Tra).

In an interview to Damnation Vault, Otep explained the concept behind "Kisses and Kerosene";

"I had read an article about a rather diseased rodent of a human being, who had hurt some children in the most terrible way imaginable. During his trial, he was sort of just laughing at what he’d done and how he hurt these kids and taking their lives. And these are young kids, these are little eight/nine-year-old children. And I just — you know, there’s a part of me that’s got this — I’m empowered by the vigil anti-spirit and I didn’t think that sending him to jail was an appropriate punishment, and that was my idea of what the appropriate punishment would’ve been to someone who steals innocence and hurts children."

== Release and promotion ==
Smash the Control Machine was released by Victory Records on August 18, 2009. Along with a standard edition, a deluxe edition was released with a bonus DVD as well. The pre-release package also contained a T-shirt featuring the album cover and a poster of the cover.

To promote the album, Otep embarked on the "Rise, Rebel, Resist" Tour in the US along with Victory labelmates Bury Your Dead and Destrophy.

"Head" was featured on the fantasy drama series True Blood. When asked how the collaboration came about, Otep responded; "I’m not sure how it happened. I got a message from Victory telling me to check this out. I mean Otep and True Blood. I almost fell out of my chair. I am a big fan of the show. It is such an honor to be a part of it."

== Commercial performance ==
The album was expected to sell between 12-15k copies in its first week. Ultimately, the album sold 10,400 copies in its first week of release to debut at #47 on The Billboard 200 chart. By January 2010, the album had sold 40,000 copies in the US.

== Reception ==
Professional ratings
Review scores
Source	Rating
AllMusic	3/5 stars
AltSounds	44%
Fangoria	3/4 stars
laut.de	3/5 stars
Metal.de	4/10
Rock Hard	7/10
Ultimate Guitar	8/10

Smash the Control Machine received mixed reviews from critics.

In a negative review from Exclaim!, Laina Dawes said; "Everyone knows that Shamaya's messages are what hold this band together, but it doesn't have to be so painfully obvious. The bark is still there, but the bite is gone."

== Track listing ==
All music and lyrics written by Otep.

No.	Title	Length
1.	"Rise, Rebel, Resist"	3:59
2.	"Sweet Tooth"	4:21
3.	"Smash the Control Machine"	3:44
4.	"Head"	5:11
5.	"Numb & Dumb"	4:26
6.	"Oh, So Surreal"	4:21
7.	"Run for Cover"	3:35
8.	"Kisses & Kerosene"	4:12
9.	"Unveiled"	3:28
10.	"UR A WMN NOW"	4:19
11.	"Serv Asat"	2:30
12.	"Where the River Ends"	11:57
13.	"I Remember" (Hidden Track)	8:34

== Personnel ==
- Otep Shamaya – vocals
- Rob Patterson – guitar
- Emilie Autumn – violin on "UR A WMN NOW"
- Koichi Fukuda – piano on "UR A WMN NOW"
- Jason "eViL J" McGuire – bass guitar, backup vocals
- Mark "Moke" Bistany – drums

== Awards ==
In 2010, Otep was nominated for a GLAAD Media Award for "Outstanding Music Artist" for the album Smash the Control Machine during the 21st GLAAD Media Awards.
