= Pandie James =

New Zealand actress and writer

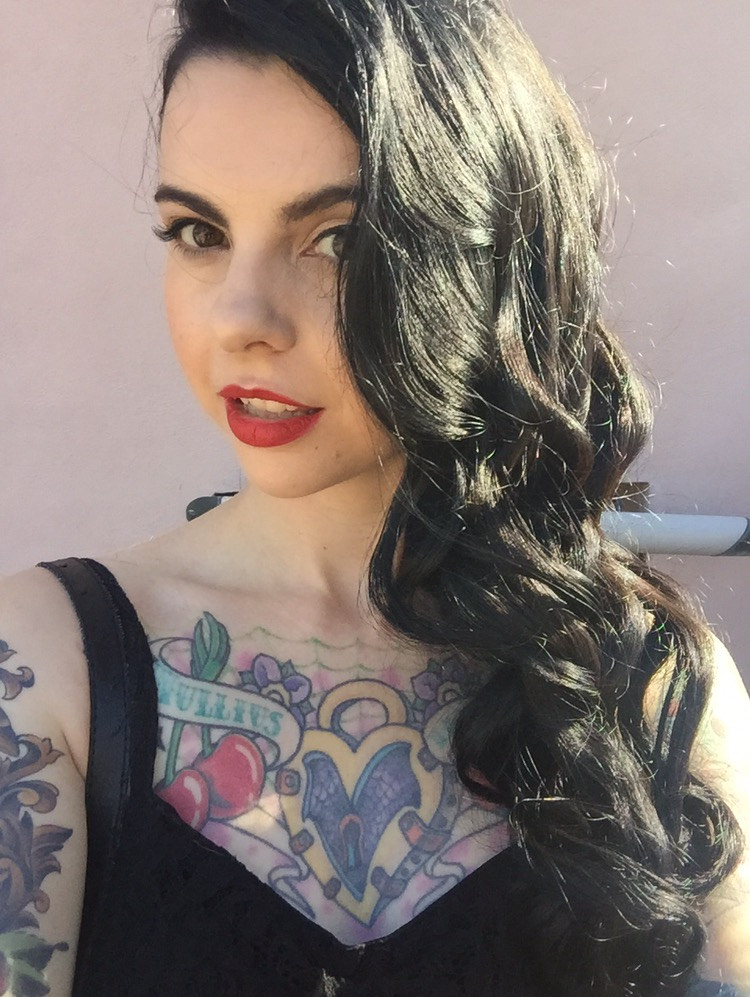
- Pandie James in 2015
- Born: Wellington, New Zealand
- Other names: Pandie Suicide, Pandie
- Occupations: Novelist, producer, screenwriter, actress, model
- Years active: 2012–present

Pandie James, also known as Pandie Suicide, is a New Zealand writer, actress, producer and model.

== Biography ==
Pandie James grew up in New Zealand where she obtained a Bachelor of Arts degree in Media Studies before moving to Los Angeles. She is a model for the website SuicideGirls and has appeared in many music videos, including director David Lynch's Crazy Clown Time, and for artists such as Aerosmith, Taylor Swift, Ghost and Pantera. She is part Maori and of Ngati Porou descent.

In 2015, she released a short story entitled Vampire Summer that she had rediscovered on an old hard drive. The story, written when James was a teenager, centers around vampires in Wellington, New Zealand. The short story hit No. 2 and No. 8 in two separate Amazon bestsellers categories. Her debut novel, the urban fantasy genred Seraphim Song was also released around the same time. The cover art was created by English artist Sam Shearon.

Pandie Suicide appeared in an interview feature in Hustler Magazine's January 2017 issue entitled 'The Final Girls: Horror's Hottest Scream Queens,' alongside horror actresses Danielle Harris, Erin Marie Hogan and Victoria De Mare. The issue was released 25 October 2016.

As a model, she has appeared in many tattoo magazine features including several cover issues, and was also photographed for Justice Howard's photography coffee table book, 'Revelations – The Photography of Justice Howard' along with many well known musicians, actors, tattoo artists and tattoo models such as Dave Navarro, Danny Trejo and Mark Mahoney.

In an interview with Tattoo Magazine in 2011, James stated that she did not drink alcohol, smoke or use drugs and that this sometimes surprised people. She appeared as a guest on the Spanish language Late-night talk show 'Noches Con Platanito' on Estrella TV on 16 May 2017, in a segment that also featured Telenovela star Pablo Cruz Guerrero and Mexican Playboy Playmate Gaby Ramirez.

== Film career ==
Pandie James is most known for her work in horror movies, generally appearing under the name Pandie Suicide. She was nominated for 'Best Actress' at the NYCIFF Fright Fest in 2016 for her work in Blood Bath.

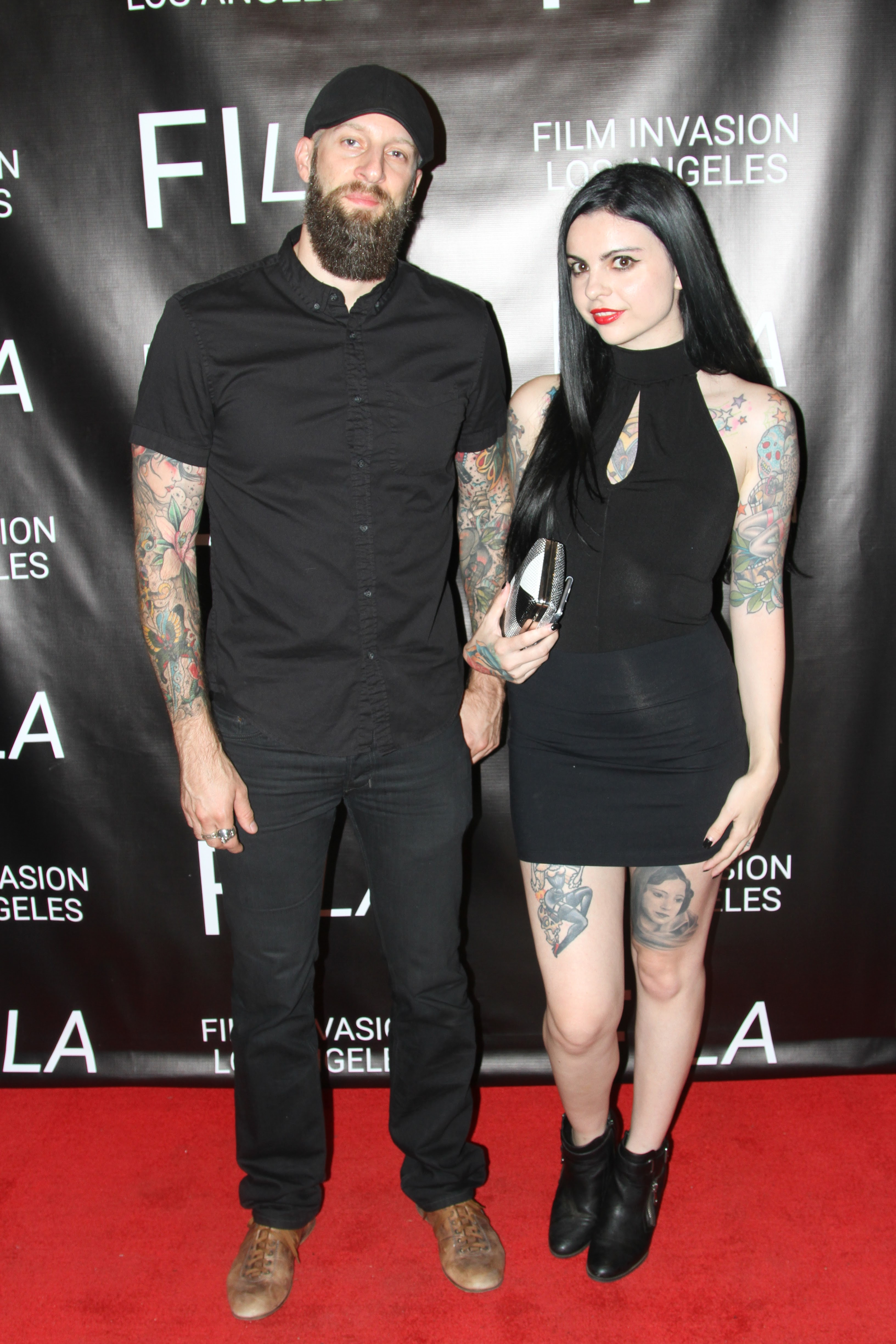
Pandie James with frequent creative collaborator director Erik Boccio at the premiere of Blood Bath at Film Invasion LA Festival 2016 in Sherman Oaks, California.

=== Massacre ===
Massacre is a short slasher film that was written, produced by and stars Pandie Suicide. The film was directed by Erik Boccio and also stars Billy Idol guitarist Billy Morrison and Samhain drummer/ bassist London May. MASSACRE was scored by ex-Korn guitar player Rob Patterson and Marilyn Manson bass player Jeordie White (also known as Twiggy Ramirez), both of whom make a cameo appearance in the film, The score earned an honorable mention award at the Fantasmagorical Film Festival in Louisville, Kentucky in 2015. The film is about a girl, played by Pandie Suicide, who wakes up at the site of a bloody mass murder and cannot remember what happened.

=== Blood Bath ===
Blood Bath is a short slasher film with supernatural elements that was written, produced by and stars Pandie Suicide as 'Liz' with the lead role of 'Marv' played by Jeordie White. The film follows 'a reimagined Liz Bathory as she dips her toe in the modern dating pool' a reference to Hungarian 'blood countess' Elizabeth Bathory. The film was again directed by Erik Boccio and scored by Rob Patterson, both of whom had collaborated on Pandie Suicide's previous film MASSACRE, along with Jeordie White. Slipknot DJ Sid Wilson made an appearance as 'The Frozen Guy' and the two other roles were played by actress Kimberly Ables Jindra, and fine artist Shannon Crawford. Make Up FX were created by special FX make up artist Laney Chantal who previously appeared on the make up competition reality television show Face Off as a contestant. The film was released online on the Deathaus Films YouTube account in May 2016. Blood Bath was an official selection at multiple Film Festivals, including the Dragon Con International Film Festival, Film Invasion Los Angeles, NYCIFF Fright Fest, and Hollywood Reel Independent Film Festival where it picked up the award for 'Best Horror Short'. In November 2016 the film was awarded a Gold Award in the Spotlight Horror Film Awards for the Best Independent Horror Films of 2016.

== Filmography ==
Year	Film	Producer	Director	Writer	Actor
2015	MASSACRE	X mark		X mark	X mark
2016	Blood Bath	X mark		X mark	X mark
2016	Ditch Day Massacre				X mark
2017	Night Terrorizer	X mark		X mark	X mark
Unknown	Of Bloody Dreams	X mark		X mark	X mark

== Television ==
On 14 November 2018, it was announced via Bloody Disgusting that a new upcoming short series project entitled The Midnight Snack had been shot and behind the scenes photos were released. Pandie Suicide was named as the writer, producer and a star of the project, playing the role of Betty Lou. Sid Wilson was again named as an actor, playing the role of John with Erik Boccio directing.

Year	Television Show	Producer	Director	Writer	Creator	Actor
2017	Noches Con Platanito					X mark
2018	The Midnight Snack	X mark		X mark	X mark	X mark

== Bibliography ==
=== Novels ===
- Seraphim Song (2015)

=== Short stories ===
- Vampire Summer (2015)

== Magazine covers ==
Magazine cover history as of 9 November 2016
Magazine	Country	Date	Photographer	Notes
Total Tattoo	United Kingdom	December 2015	Jenna Kraczek	
Tattoo Flash	United States	December 2012	Kimberly Millard	

== Magazine features ==
- Hustler Magazine – January 2017
- Inked Magazine – October 2016
- Total Tattoo Magazine – December 2015
- Inked Magazine – June 2013
- Skin Art Magazine – Issue #151, April 2013
- Skinz Magazine – Issue #23, 2012
- Tattoo Erotica Magazine – September 2012
- Tattoo Magazine – Issue #268, December 2011
- Skin and Ink Magazine – April 2011

== See also ==
- SuicideGirls
- List of vegans
