= Gods of Rock n Roll =

"Gods of Rock n Roll" (Orchestral)

Single by Billy Morrison and Ozzy Osbourne

from the album The Morrison Project (Deluxe Edition)
- Released: February 14, 2025
- Genre: Ballad
- Length: 5:06 (original version); 5:16 (orchestral version); 5:15 (stripped down orchestral version)
- Label: TLG | ZOID
- Songwriter(s): Billy Morrison; Erik Eldenius; Ozzy Osbourne
- Producer(s): Billy Morrison

Gods of Rock n Roll is a song by British hard rock musician Billy Morrison featuring English heavy metal singer Ozzy Osbourne. Originally released on Morrison's studio album God Shaped Hole (2015), the track was later re-recorded with an orchestra and released as a single on 14 February 2025. This new version found notable chart success, and was Osbourne's final studio recording before his death on 22 July 2025.

== Background and release ==
The original recording of Gods of Rock n Roll – originally titled "Gods", – was included as the closing track of Morrison's second studio album God Shaped Hole, released via King Mob Music on 23 October 2015. As recounted by Ultimate Classic Rock, this version was "a straight-forward band recording. Osbourne always felt that was a missed opportunity, considering this is such a grand ballad." In an interview with Kerrang!, Osbourne elaborated:

"Billy [Morrison] and I wrote 'Gods of Rock n Roll' together in a hotel room while I was touring in South America about 10 years ago," [...] "This re-recorded version of the song finally has all the bells and whistles. I told Billy then that it needed an orchestra and a choir, but it took 10 fucking years for him to listen to me!"

The new recording had its radio premiere on Osbourne's SiriusXM channel Ozzy's Boneyard on 23 January 2025, causing the song to appear on the charts multiple weeks before its actual release date. It debuted at No. 26 and eventually peaked at No. 8 on Billboard's Mainstream Rock chart. The track was also included on the deluxe edition of Morrison's third studio album The Morrison Project (2024) on 21 February 2025, and an additional "stripped down" mix of the orchestral version was released as a single on 1 July 2025.
