= Atavist (album) =

Studio album by Otep
- Released: April 26, 2011
- Recorded: Late 2010
- Genre: Nu metal; groove metal
- Length: 50:55
- Label: Victory Records
- Producer: Ulrich Wild

Otep chronology
Smash the Control Machine (2009)	Atavist (2011)	Hydra (2013)

Singles from Atavist
- 1. "Fists Fall" Released: April 6, 2011; 2. "Not to Touch the Earth" Released: May 4, 2011

Atavist is the fifth studio album by American metal band Otep. The album was released on 26 April 2011 through Victory Records. This is the first album to not feature long-time bassist Jason "eViL j" McGuire who left the band on September 30, 2010.

== Recording ==
Otep commented on their approach to the album's recording process; “Going into recording ATAVIST I wanted to feel, not think. I wanted to allow my subconscious to take over and let it guide me. I wanted to be a bit more primitive and emotional in sound and approach and I think I conquered that. I’m very proud of it."

== Songs ==
"This album is a return to the umbra, to the darkest parts of me. I am fortifying this fortress of sound with Cyclopean masonry. The language on my lips is forged from forbidden tongues 12 lifetimes old. I am the heart of the gorgon, the broken mind of the lunatic, the courage of the martyr, the voice of the insurrectionist, the agog of the alchemist, I am the defiance in the aching souls waiting for the flame, I am the mighty Minotaur raging against the labyrinths of isolation and sadness. There is a purposeful primal spirit to this record, a coded provocation to remember our connection to the infinite, to the mysterious, to each other."

— Otep discussing the nature of Atavist.

=== We Dream Like Lions ===
Otep discussed the song in an interview to Metal Riot;

I was watching a documentary about all the recent suicides of Gay and Lesbian teenagers due to bullying. Matthew Shepard was one of the people that showed up in the documentary. The song started out inspired by those events, and I use “inspired loosely”…a reaction to those events. I didn’t wanna just write a sad, sad song. I wanted to write a song that inspires people who know what it feels like to be bullied, who know what it feels like to be pushed around or left aside or excluded. I wanted to honor those people who continue to dream like Lions and will never allow anyone to define them or their place in society. I wanted to write something beautiful, because that’s how it made me feel to read the stories of survivors."

=== Not to Touch the Earth ===
"Not to Touch the Earth" is a cover of The Doors, from their album Waiting For The Sun. Otep has cited The Doors as an inspiration for the band. "That song for me fits the record 100%. The producer and I, Ulrich Wild, he helped transform that song from a 60’s hippy transcendental song into an edgy, transcendental modern hard rock song. If the Doors were a current band, what would that song sound like now? That’s the approach we tried to take. Preserve the spirit of what they were creating but take it into a new place as well.”

== Release and promotion ==
On March 8, Otep Shamaya shared the track titles "Atom to Adam", "Blood of Saints", "Remember to Forget", and "We Dream Like Lions" via Facebook and Twitter.

On March 15, Otep Shamaya shared the track title "Not to Touch the Earth" via Twitter at 8PM PST. The track is a cover of The Doors song of the same name.

On March 21, Victory Records launched an audio stream of the song "Drunk on the Blood of Saints".

The first single from the album, "Fists Fall", made its debut on Full Metal Jackie Radio on March 26. On March 29, the single was available to purchase separately or as a bundle along with the song "Not to Touch the Earth" on iTunes.

On April 16, 2011, the entire album was available to stream :30 and 1:30 previews of all songs via iTunes.

Professional ratings
Review scores
Source	Rating
AllMusic	2.5/5 stars
Metalholic	7.8/10
Metal Storm	7.7/10
Revolver	3/5 stars

== Track listing ==
All lyrics are written by Otep Shamaya; all music is composed by Rani Sharone, Gil Sharone, Collyn McCoy, Tony Campos, Markus Estrada, Ulrich Wild, except where noted otherwise.

Atavist track listing
No.	Title	Length
1.	"Atavist Animus"	0:46
2.	"Atom to Adam"	4:05
3.	"Drunk on the Blood of Saints"	4:04
4.	"Remember to Forget"	4:24
5.	"Skin of the Master"	3:47
6.	"We Dream Like Lions"	3:13
7.	"I, Alone"	3:41
8.	"Baby's Breath"	7:12
9.	"Fists Fall"	3:50
10.	"Stay"	4:43
11.	"Bible Belt"	5:38
12.	"Not to Touch the Earth" (The Doors cover)	5:32
Total length:		50:55

== Deluxe edition DVD ==
- Baby's Breath (A Short Film)
- Spiritual Intercourse (Inside the Mind of Otep Shamaya)
- Alchemy & Atavism
- Smash The Control Machine (Music Video)
- Rise, Rebel, Resist (Music Video)
- Run for Cover (Music Video)

== Personnel ==
- Otep Shamaya - vocals (all tracks)
- Gil Sharone - drums (all tracks)
- Markus Estrada - guitars (2–5, 7, 9, 12)
- Ulrich Wild - keyboards/guitar (2, 4, 5, 10, 11)
- Collyn McCoy - bass guitar (2, 5–7, 9, 10, 12)
- Tony Campos - bass guitar (3, 4)
- Rani Sharone - guitars (6, 10)

== Credits ==
- Mastering - Dave Collins
- Photography - Djosefin Maurer
- Layout - Doublej
- Package Design - Doublej
- Illustrations - Joey James Hernandez
- Art Direction - Otep
- Assistant - Raider
- Engineer - Ulrich Wild
- Mixing - Ulrich Wild
- Producer - Ulrich Wild
