= Otep =

American nu metal band

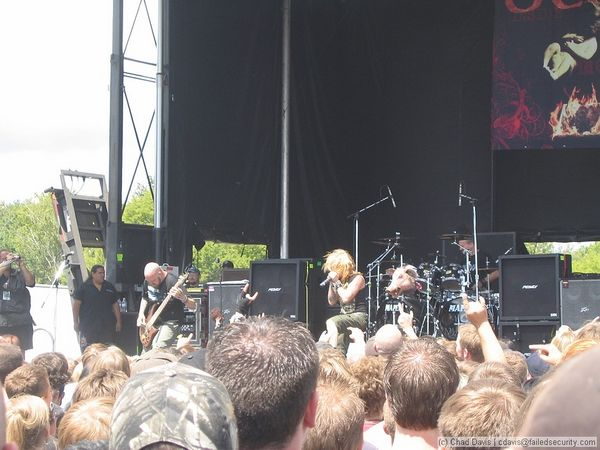
- Otep performing in 2004

Background information
- Origin: Los Angeles, California, U.S.
- Genres: Nu metal; alternative metal; rap metal
- Years active: 2000–2024
- Labels: Capitol; Koch; Victory; Napalm; Cleopatra
- Past members: Otep Shamaya; Tarver Marsh; Dave "Spooky" Aguilera; Mark "Moke" Bistany; Rob Patterson; Jason "eViL J" McGuire; Karma Singh Cheema; Brian "Haggis" Wolff; Justin Kier
- Website: otepsaves.me

Otep was an American nu metal band formed in November 2000 in Los Angeles by frontwoman Otep Shamaya. The band is noted for their "art-house nu metal", and their political stances. Throughout several lineup changes over the years, Shamaya was the only constant member in the band.

After Sharon Osbourne selected them to appear at Ozzfest 2001, Otep signed with Capitol Records without a demo in March 2001. Otep released two albums through Capitol, Sevas Tra (2002) and House of Secrets (2004); both were moderate successes and sold a total of 400,000 copies worldwide by 2006. Otep's third album, The Ascension, was due for release through Capitol in March 2007, but was delayed indefinitely following the label's consolidation into Capitol Music Group two months prior to its planned release date. The band parted ways with the label, and the album was issued through Koch Records in October of that year.

In February 2009, Otep signed with Victory Records. The band released three albums through the label; Smash the Control Machine (2009), which reunited the Sevas Tra lineup, Atavist (2011), and Hydra (2013), a concept album. Hydra was intended to be the band's final album, but Shamaya continued the band, and they released two more albums through Napalm Records, Generation Doom (2016) and Kult 45 (2018). Otep's ninth and final album, The God Slayer, was released through Cleopatra Records on September 15, 2023. Shamaya announced her retirement from music in November 2024, ending the band.

== History ==
=== Early years, Jihad and Sevas Tra (2000–2003) ===
Otep began in Los Angeles in November 2000. They were invited to play Ozzfest before they had signed to a label after Sharon Osbourne saw their fourth live performance. They played Ozzfest several times. Otep signed with Capitol Records after four shows and without a demo, on the strength of their live performance. They started playing around Los Angeles and released the EP Jihad in June 2001. After Ozzfest, guitarists Marsh and Aguilera were fired and replaced with Rob Patterson for the rest of the tours that year.

The band released their album Sevas Tra with Terry Date on June 18, 2002, and played several shows at the Ozzfest and was considered a prime band there in 2002. Their first time at Ozzfest was in 2001 with their eighth show. The first album peaked at 145 on the Billboard 200 and 86 on the UK Albums Chart.

=== House of Secrets (2004–2006) ===
On July 27, 2004, Otep released their second album, House of Secrets, produced by Greg Wells. The album peaked at 93 on the Billboard 200 and 102 on the French Chart.

=== The Ascension (2007–2008) ===
After three years of touring, the band recorded a third album, The Ascension, with a scheduled release date of March 20, 2007. In preparation of its original release, they toured with Static-X starting in the spring of 2007.

The album was delayed indefinitely due to the Capitol Music Group merger in January 2007. The merger led to the firing of the label's president and the band's A&R representative from the label, and Otep was left in limbo whether to stay at the label or find a new one. Capitol dropped them in May 2007.

In September 2007, the band signed with Koch Records, who released The Ascension in October. Upon release, it peaked at 81 on the Billboard 200 and 6 on the US Independent Charts. The album sold about 10,200 album copies in its first week of release.

=== Smash the Control Machine (2009–2010) ===
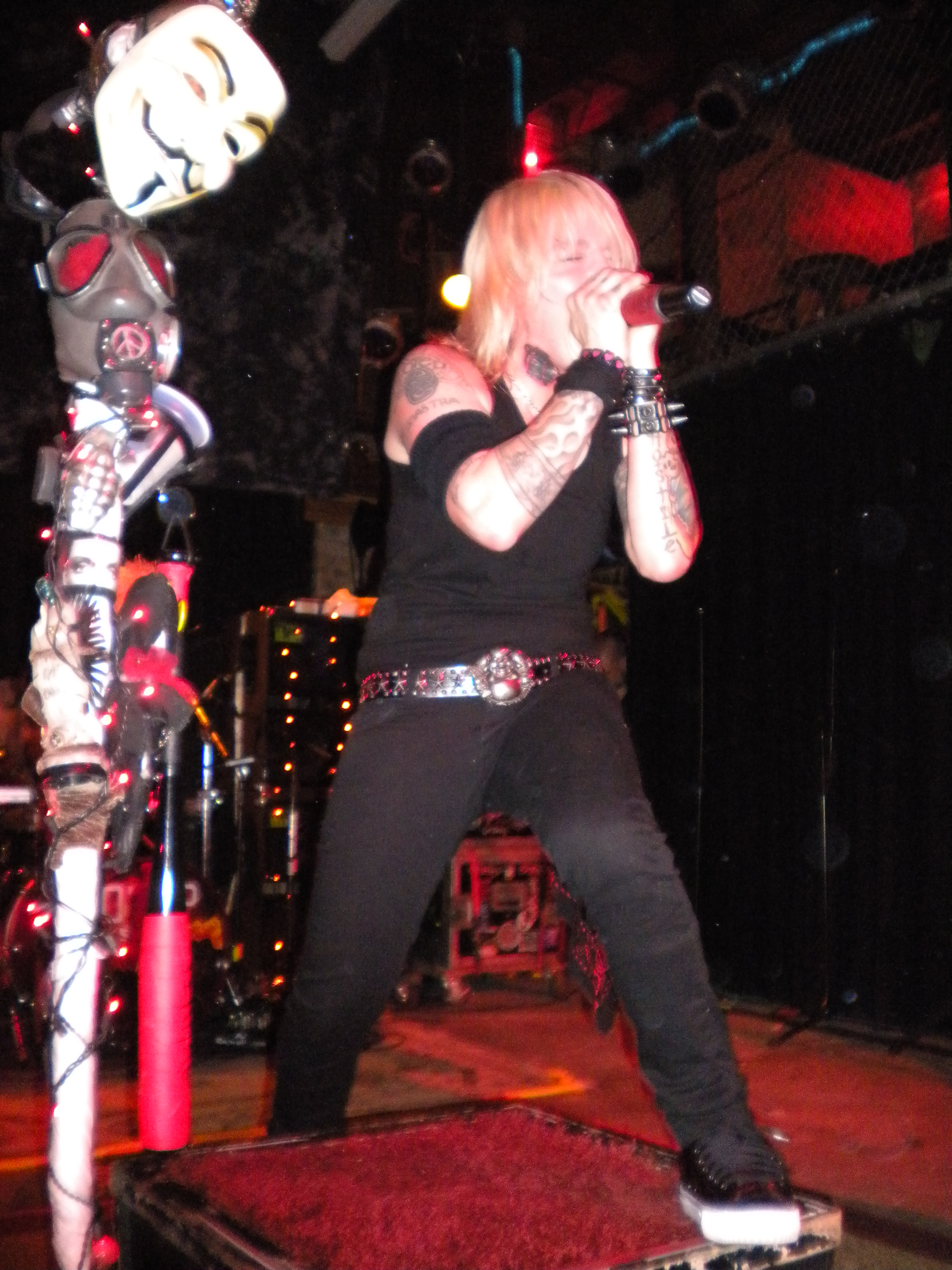

In 2009, Otep signed with Victory Records. Their 2009 album, Smash the Control Machine, released on August 18, 2009, included a reunion with former members Mark "Moke" Bistany on drums and Rob Patterson on guitar. The album featured Koichi Fukuda on piano, and Emilie Autumn on violin, and a song co-written with Holly Knight, which resulted in "UR a WMN NOW". Knight previously co-wrote "Perfectly Flawed" with Otep on The Ascension. It peaked at 47 on the Billboard 200 and 6 on the US Independent Charts.

The band appeared with 2Cents, Five Finger Death Punch and Shadows Fall on the 'Shock & Raw Tour' of North America in the fall of 2009.

On September 30, 2010, bassist Jay McGuire left the band.

=== Atavist and Sounds Like Armageddon (2011–2012) ===
On April 26, 2011, Otep released their fifth studio album, Atavist. It peaked at 61 on the Billboard 200, 10 on the Independent Charts and 19 on the US Rock Charts. On November 6, 2012, Otep released their first live album, Sounds Like Armageddon.

=== Hydra and further activity (2013–2014) ===
In an interview, Otep Shamaya said that Hydra would be the band's final album. The album was released on January 22, 2013 and peaked at 133 on the Billboard 200.

The band toured the U.S. east coast and Australia for their Sounds of Armageddon tour. In early 2014, Otep confirmed on her personal Facebook account and the band account that another album would be made.

In April 2014, Otep signed a new management deal with Kam 9.8 Machlation Group, a company founded by Slipknot's DJ Sid Wilson and his business partner Synonym Mead. The contract with Kam 9.8 was not renewed. In September 2015, Otep announced on her Facebook page that the band had signed a new management deal with Napalm Records, and that a new album would be released in the spring of 2016 (pre-order from winter 2015).

=== Generation Doom (2015–2017) ===
"Signing with Napalm Records is one of the most exciting alliances I've ever made. I haven't felt this excited to write a new album since 'Sevas Tra.' There's a lot of work to do, a lot of music to write, a lot of things to say, a lot of injustices to confront and a lot of madness to summon and capture. To be able to forge this sacred alchemy with the dark brilliance of producer Howard Benson is a dream come true."

On February 4, 2016, Otep announced that the album would be titled Generation Doom and would be released on April 15. They released the album art on their Facebook page. On April 11, 2016 Billboard was to stream Generation Doom in its entirety for 24 hours, but due to its success extended the streaming time to several days.

The music video for the song "In Cold Blood" premiered on April 15, 2016, on Music Choice. On Record Store Day (April 16, 2016), record stores released a picture vinyl disk of Generation Doom. On April 20, Napalm Records released the video for "In Cold Blood" on their YouTube page.

Generation Doom sold 5,825 copies in its first week of sale in the United States. It was number 3 of the top 8 Napalm Record sellers in the week of April 23. On April 26 the album reached #7 on the Billboard Rock Chart, #10 on the Independent Chart and #109 on the Top 200 Albums Chart. On May 7, the album reached #4 on the Billboard Hard Rock Chart

=== Kult 45, The God Slayer and Shamaya's retirement (2018–2024) ===
On May 2, 2018, Otep disclosed the album title and artwork for their eighth album, together with disclosing interviews about the content of the album. The official Napalm announcement read, "You can expect a complete and total mutiny of the senses on Kult 45", says Shamaya. "That said, it's important for fans to know that this record is not just an indictment of Trump. The idea is rather to empower people to stand up and remind them this is our country and we have the power. It's primarily a rallying cry for people with common sense and good-natured patriots to rise up and know that we own this nation."

"Although the album is produced well technically, lyrically, it's very raw. Musically, we explore different genres - we're trying to reach everyone. I don't want to be limited to one genre or to be anchored to a particular space where I can only reach certain political minds. It's important to me that I'm sending a clear and concise message to the Resistance - the people out there bending the barricades and fighting for justice is this country."

Kult 45 was recorded at The Lair in Los Angeles, with the same equipment used for Otep's first album, Sevas Tra (down to Shamaya's microphone, a SHURE Beta 58), to create a sound reminiscent of their roots. Kult 45 was self-produced by the band, with assistant engineering from Larry Goetz, Nicolas Schilke, and Lizzy Ostro. It was mentioned that the lyrics would tackle the immigrant crisis, rape culture and the US government.

In an episode of 'Wake and Bake' (a weekly Facebook live stream on the Otep page) Justin Kier said that while creating this album the band had kept the fans in mind. Therefore, making it an album for the fans, rather than for self-exploration.

The first single of the album, "To the Gallows", was released on May 25, 2018, along with a lyric video. The album sold 1,850 copies in its first week, and became Otep's first studio album not to chart on the Billboard 200.

Otep's ninth album, The God Slayer, was released through Cleopatra Records on September 15, 2023. The album features original material and covers of songs by artists including Lil Peep, Olivia Rodrigo, Billie Eilish and Eminem. After its release, Otep Shamaya said that the album would be Otep's last, "In symbolic terms, nine is the last single digit. So [The God Slayer] is the last; it represents the last. I don't know if I'll make another record". From April to May 2024, Otep toured with Doyle. In November 2024, she announced her retirement from music and began "liquidating" her collection of musical equipment.

== Musical style and influences ==
The band's style is primarily nu metal, and is also considered alternative metal. It has also been labelled as gothic metal, rap metal and extreme metal. AllMusic has described Otep as "art house nu-metal". Otep's influences include Slipknot, Slayer, Korn, Rage Against the Machine, The Notorious B.I.G., Nine Inch Nails, Jim Morrison, Tool, the Doors, Nirvana, and Deftones. Although the band's style is primarily nu metal, their music incorporates strong elements of death metal.

== Awards ==
In 2004, the music video for the single "Warhead" was on the top ten of MTV Headbangers Ball. In 2010, Otep was nominated for a GLAAD Media Award for "Outstanding Music Artist" for the album Smash the Control Machine during the 21st GLAAD Media Awards.

Beginning with The Ascension and continuing through to Generation Doom, Otep has consistently charted high, most often in the top five on the Billboard Hard Rock Chart.

== Band members ==
Former members

- Otep Shamaya – vocals (2000–2024)
- Tarver Marsh – guitar (2000)
- Dave "Spooky" Aguilera – guitars (2000–2001)
- Mark "Moke" Bistany – drums (2000–2003, 2009)
- Rob Patterson – guitars (2001–2004, 2009)
- Jason "eViL J" McGuire – bass (2000–2010)
- Karma Singh Cheema – guitar (2006–2007)
- Brian "Haggis" Wolff – drums (2006–2008)
- Justin Kier – drums (2013–2020)
- Ari Mihalopoulos – guitar (2011)
- Andrew Barnes – bass (2016)
- Lamar Little – drums (2020–2022)
- AJ Bartholomew – guitars (2022)

Touring musicians

- Lane Maverick – guitar (2001)
- Lee Rios – guitar (2004)
- Scotty CH – guitar (2005)
- Melissa DeGott – guitar (2006)
- Aaron Nordstrom – guitar (2007–2008)
- Steven Barbola – guitar (2008–2010)
- Scot Coogan – drums (2003)
- David Lopez – drums (2004)
- Doug Pellerin – drums (2004–2005)
- Dave Gentry – drums (2008–2010)
- Chasin Cox – drums (2010)
- Joe Fox – drums (2011)
- Chase Brickenden – drums (2012)
- Erik Tisinger – bass (2011–2013)
- Corey Wolford – bass (2014–2015)
- Tiaday Ball – bass (2022–2024)
- AJ Bartholomew – guitar (2022)

Timeline

== Discography ==
=== Albums ===
==== Studio albums ====
List of studio albums, with selected chart positions
Title	Details	Peak chart positions									
Title	Details	US	US Ind.	US Rock	BEL (FL)	BEL (WA)	FRA	JPN	SWI	UK	UK Rock
Sevas Tra	Released: June 18, 2002; Label: Capitol; Formats: CD, download	145	—	—	—	—	—	—	—	86	10
House of Secrets	Released: July 27, 2004; Label: Capitol; Formats: CD, download	93	—	—	—	—	102	—	—	—	—
The Ascension	Released: October 30, 2007; Label: Koch; Formats: CD, LP, download	81	6	25	—	—	—	197	—	—	—
Smash the Control Machine	Released: August 18, 2009; Label: Victory; Formats: CD, download	47	6	13	—	—	—	—	—	—	—
Atavist	Released: April 26, 2011; Label: Victory; Formats: CD, download	61	10	19	—	—	—	—	—	—	—
Hydra	Released: January 22, 2013; Label: Victory; Formats: CD, download	133	22	39	—	—	—	—	—	—	—
Generation Doom	Released: April 15, 2016; Label: Napalm; Formats: CD, LP, download	109	10	13	137	136	—	—	—	—	—
Kult 45	Released: July 27, 2018; Label: Napalm; Formats: CD, LP, download	— (Note: Kult 45 did not enter the Billboard 200, but peaked at number 89 on the Top Album Sales chart.)	11	—	—	—	—	—	100	—	—
The God Slayer	Released: September 15, 2023; Label: Cleopatra; Formats: CD, LP, download	—	—	—	—	—	—	—	—	—	—
"—" denotes a recording that did not chart or was not released in that territory.

==== Live albums ====
List of live albums
Title	Details
Sounds Like Armageddon	Released: November 6, 2012; Label: Victory; Formats: CD, download

=== Extended plays ===
List of extended plays
Title	Details
Jihad	Released: June 19, 2001; Label: Capitol; Formats: CD, download
Wurd Becomes Flesh	Released: 2005; Label: Self-released; Formats: CD

=== Singles ===
List of singles, with selected chart positions, showing year released and album name
Title	Year	Peak chart positions		Album
Title	Year	US Act. Rock	US Main. Rock	Album
"T.R.I.C."	2001	—	—	Jihad
"Blood Pigs"	2002	—	—	Sevas Tra
"Warhead"	2004	—	—	House of Secrets
"Buried Alive"	2004	—	—	House of Secrets
"Ghostflowers"	2007	—	—	The Ascension
"Breed"	2007	—	—	The Ascension
"Perfectly Flawed"	2008	—	—	The Ascension
"Confrontation"	2008	—	—	The Ascension
"Smash the Control Machine"	2009	27	28	Smash the Control Machine
"Rise, Rebel, Resist"	2010	—	—	Smash the Control Machine
"Fists Fall"	2011	—	—	Atavist
"Not to Touch the Earth"	2011	—	—	Atavist
"Apex Predator"	2013	—	—	Hydra
"In Cold Blood"	2016	—	—	Generation Doom
"Royals"	2016	—	39	Generation Doom
"To the Gallows"	2018	—	—	Kult 45
"Shelter in Place"	2018	—	—	Kult 45
"—" denotes a recording that did not chart or was not released in that territory.

==== Promotional singles ====
List of promotional singles, showing year released and album name
Title	Year	Album
"March of the Martyrs"	2007	The Ascension
"Necessary Accessories"	2008	The Ascension
"Special Pets"	2008	The Ascension
"Molotov"	2018	Kult 45
