= The Ascension (Otep album) =

Studio album by Otep
- Released: October 30, 2007
- Recorded: 2006
- Studio: Piety Street Studios, New Orleans, and Balance Studios, Mandeville, Louisiana
- Genre: Nu metal, alternative metal
- Length: 60:25; 70:44 (Bonus Tracks)
- Label: Koch
- Producer: Dave Fortman

Otep chronology
Wurd Becomes Flesh (2005)	The Ascension (2007)	Smash the Control Machine (2009)

Singles from The Ascension
- 1. "Ghostflowers" Released: November 2006; 2. "March of the Martyrs" Released: May 2007; 3. "Breed" Released: October 30, 2007; 4. "Perfectly Flawed" Released: March 18, 2008

The Ascension (stylized as the_Ascension) is the third studio album by Otep. The original release date was set for March 20, 2007 through Capitol Records, however, the album was delayed indefinitely due to the merger with Virgin Records.

The album debuted at number 81 on the Billboard 200 with 10,200 copies sold.

== Recording ==
The album was partly recorded in New Orleans, Louisiana, where producer Dave Fortman was living. New Orleans, especially the 9th Ward was still affected by the effects of Hurricane Katrina. Otep said that while the songs were not influenced by the area, the mood of the album was. The band began recording the album in late July 2006, and it was completed by the end of the year.

Several songs were written with Mudvayne guitarist Greg Tribbett, who Fortman had worked with in the past.

== Songs ==
=== Confrontation ===
Otep explained the song to KNAC.com:

"It was about writing a protest anthem to stand up, speak out and strike back. To celebrate the unique opportunity that we have here in America. You can do anything to have your voice be heard in this country, that’s the beauty of this country. There’s no one stopping anyone in America from getting out on the street and saying something or writing a letter or e-mailing and text messaging now that everything is now, now, now."

Otep compared the song to "Warhead" from House Of Secrets.

=== Breed ===
"Breed" is a cover of a Nirvana song of the same name. It is Otep's first cover song. "We'd never done a cover song before but I just love the song. I listen to music before we play on tour and that song just kind of grabbed me. I couldn't get enough of it. I'd listen to it 60, 70 times, just over and over in the back of the bus before the show,” she explained to Campus Circle. “For me, it's just this amazing song that touched me in a certain way that made me miss Nirvana a lot and Kurt Cobain's touch on musical culture and his philosophy on music and art. I just wanted to do something to inspire and to, in a way, connect our energies.”

== Reception ==
The Ascension received mixed reviews from critics.

Professional ratings
Review scores
Source	Rating
AllMusic	2.5/5 stars
Alternative Press	3.5/5 stars
Blabbermouth.net	5/10
Blender	3/5 stars
Collector's Guide to Heavy Metal	5/10
Grand Island Independent	3.5/5 stars
Los Angeles Times	3/4 stars
Ultimate Guitar	8/10

== Track listing ==
All lyrics are written by Otep Shamaya; all music is composed by Shamaya, Karma Singh Cheema, "Evil" J. McGuire, and Brian Wolf, except where noted.

No.	Title	Music	Length
1.	"Eet the Children"		3:47
2.	"Crooked Spoons"	Shamaya, G. Tribbett	4:19
3.	"Perfectly Flawed"	Shamaya, Holly Knight	3:48
4.	"Confrontation"	Shamaya, G. Tribbett	3:13
5.	"Milk of Regret"		6:00
6.	"Noose & Nail"		3:40
7.	"Ghostflowers"		4:23
8.	"Breed" (Nirvana cover)	Kurt Cobain	3:27
9.	"March of the Martyrs"		4:16
10.	"Invisible"	Shamaya, G. Tribbett	5:24
11.	"Home Grown"		4:20
12.	"Communion"		4:26
13.	"Adrenochrome Dreams" (Hidden track, music starts at 3:33)	Shamaya	9:55

Japanese bonus tracks
No.	Title	Length
14.	"Special Pets"	3:56
15.	"Necessary Accessories"	4:16
16.	"Breed (radio edit)"	3:00

Best Buy bonus tracks
No.	Title	Length
14.	"Special Pets"	3:56
15.	"Necessary Accessories"	4:11

iTunes bonus track
No.	Title	Music	Length
14.	"And I Burn"	Shamaya	2:13
15.	"Exothermic Oxidation"	Shamaya	8:30

== Personnel ==
- Otep Shamaya – vocals
- Karma Singh Cheema – guitars
- Holly Knight – mellotron, piano, programming on "Perfectly Flawed"
- Jason "eViL J" McGuire – bass guitar, backing vocals
- Brian Wolff – drums

== Production ==
- Art direction, design – Otep Shamaya, P.R. Brown
- Photography – P.R. Brown, Sam Throne
- Engineer – Jeremy Parker
- Assistant engineers – David Troia, Drew Vonderhaar, Wesley Fontenot
- Executive producer – Jonathan Cohen, Otep Shamaya
- Mastering – Ted Jensen
- Recording, producer, mixing – Dave Fortman
- Drum technician – Rory Facianne
- Co-producer – Holly Knight
