= Camp Freddy =

American rock supergroup

- Origin: Los Angeles, California, US
- Genres: Hard rock; rock
- Years active: 2002–2014
- Past members: Matt Sorum; Dave Navarro; Billy Morrison; Donovan Leitch; Chris Chaney; Mark McGrath; Scott Weiland; Scott Ford
- Website: campfreddy.net

Camp Freddy was an American hard rock supergroup consisting of established musicians who played rock covers at various shows around the United States from 2002 through 2014. The band consisted of core members Matt Sorum on drums, Dave Navarro and Billy Morrison on guitars, Donovan Leitch on vocals, and Chris Chaney on bass. Each performance featured guest appearances from well-known musicians and singers.

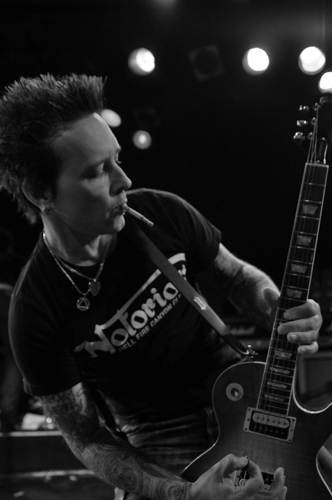
Billy Morrison

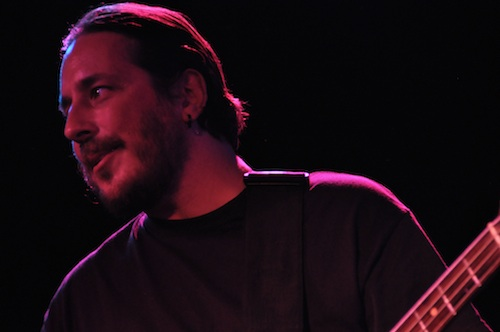
Scott Ford

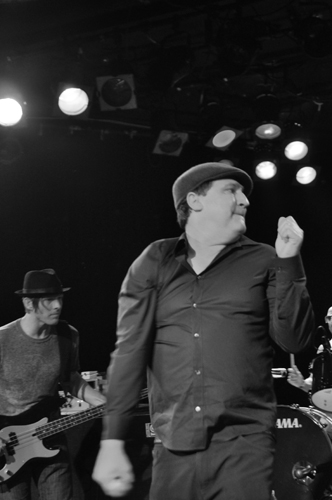
Greg Dulli performing with Camp Freddy (bass player Chris Chaney in background)

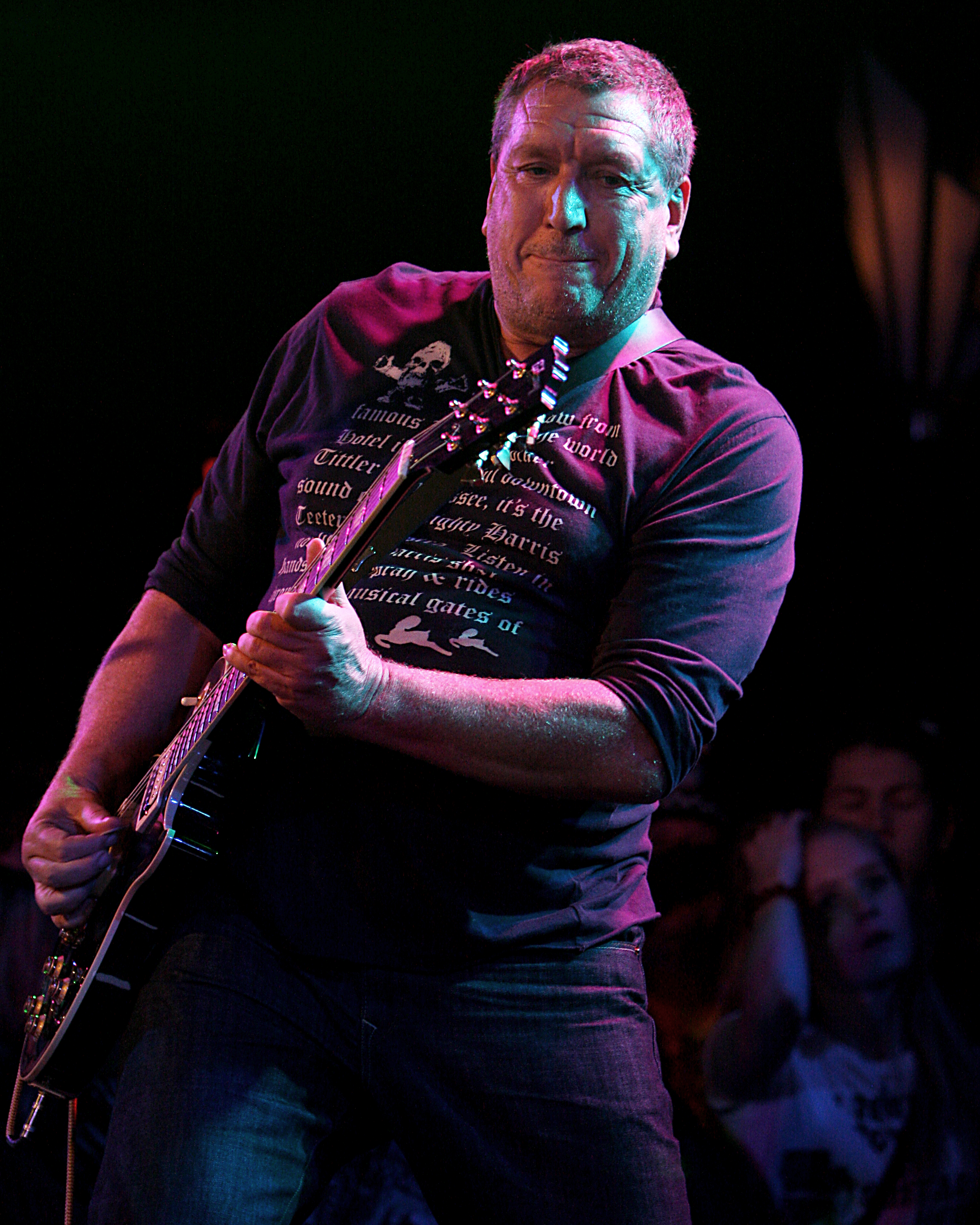
Steve Jones performing with Camp Freddy in 2008

== History ==
The band's name is derived from a character in the 1969 film The Italian Job. Guitarist Billy Morrison described them as: "...not a band, but it is also way more than a jam session; Camp Freddy is an 'occasional happening', a freak of (Hollywood) nature." The group often played secret shows and other small appearances at charity events. On Saturday evenings, band members—usually Morrison and Navarro—hosted a radio show from 6:00-8:00 on the Los Angeles–based Indie 103.1 FM radio station.

On January 28, 2005, the group performed a benefit concert for the 2004 Indian Ocean earthquake and tsunami at the Key Club in Los Angeles, which featured guest appearances from Courtney Love, Lemmy, Linda Perry, and Slash.

In March 2006, Scott Weiland joined as a core member and vocalist for the band until April 2008, when his decision to leave Velvet Revolver for Stone Temple Pilots caused tension between him and Matt Sorum. His departure from the group was announced on the April 2, 2008, edition of Camp Freddy Radio. Camp Freddy, with producer Mike Clink, were reportedly recording an album that would mirror their live shows, with guests performing on each track. So far, two tracks have been released: Cheap Trick's "Surrender" and Slade's "Merry Xmas Everybody" (2008).

In 2009, Billy Morrison stated that "there will be a record. One day! When we all get around to finishing what we started." In April 2010, the group played a show at an IZOD IndyCar Series event, which featured guest performances from Lemmy and Courtney Love.

In December 2012, the band had a residency at The Roxy in Los Angeles, which lasted for three nights, leading up to Christmas Day, featuring guest appearances from Tom Morello, Zakk Wylde, and Lana Del Rey. The following December, the group had another residency at the Roxy, with guest appearances by Billy Ray Cyrus and Courtney Love. The band's final show was on December 31, 2013.

On January 24, 2014, the group announced they would no longer perform under the name Camp Freddy, instead launching a new cover group called Royal Machines.

== Band members ==
- Donovan Leitch – lead vocals (2002–2014)
- Billy Morrison – rhythm guitar (2002–2014)
- Dave Navarro – lead guitar (2002–2014)
- Scott Ford – bass (2002–2004)
- Chris Chaney – bass (2004–2014)
- Matt Sorum – drums, vocals
- Scott Weiland – lead vocals (2006–2008, 2013; d. 2015)

=== Notable guest members ===
- Sebastian Bach – vocals †
- Chester Bennington – vocals †
- Brandon Boyd – vocals
- Jerry Cantrell – guitar
- Billy Ray Cyrus – vocals
- Tiffany Darwish – vocals
- Lana Del Rey – vocals
- Greg Dulli – vocals
- Fred Durst – vocals †
- Steve Jones – guitar
- Sully Erna – vocals, guitar
- Ace Frehley – vocals, guitar
- Macy Gray – vocals †
- Lemmy – vocals, bass †
- Courtney Love – vocals †
- Mark McGrath – vocals †
- Tom Morello – guitar †
- Chino Moreno – vocals
- Ozzy Osbourne – vocals †
- Franky Perez – vocals
- Linda Perry – vocals
- Mike Shinoda – vocals, guitar
- Slash – guitar †
- Chad Smith – drums
- Steve Stevens – guitar †
- Corey Taylor – vocals †
- Steven Tyler – vocals, drums
- Steve Vai – guitar
- Ginger Wildheart – vocals, guitar
- Zakk Wylde – vocals, guitar
- Chris Wyse - bass
- Juliette Lewis – vocals

† indicates recurring performer
