= Seven Story Drop =

- Origin: Dallas, Texas, United States
- Genres: Alternative rock, hard rock
- Years active: 2000–2008
- Past members: Jeff Current; Joshua Davies; Dewayne Dickson; Mark Yant; Andrew Ramirez; Jimmy Dereta; Eric White; Chris Dietz; Steve Allen; Kelly Panter
- Website: myspace.com/sevenstorydrop

Seven Story Drop was an American rock band from Dallas, Texas, founded in 2000 by lead singer Jeff Current and drummer, Joshua Davies.

The band was named as one of Dallas' Top Ten Bands by Harder Beat magazine in 2001, "#1 Band in Dallas" by Barstar.com in 2002, and recommended for "Rock Album of the Year", "Rock Band of the Year" and "Acoustic Performance of the Year" at the 2004 Dallas Local Music Awards.

Their song "Last Man Standing" from Gravity was used in the movie No Pain, No Gain. "How Do You Like Me Now" from Skeletons was chosen by 93.3 FM KDBN in September 2008 as the official song for the Dallas Cowboys NFL football team promotions and broadcasts.

== Discography ==
=== Studio albums ===
- Skeletons (2008)
- Gravity (2005)

=== Singles ===
- "How Do You Like Me Now" (2008)
- "Last Man Standing" (2005)
