= Prick (magazine) =

Defunct American monthly tattoo magazine

- Editor: Charles D. Brank
- Categories: Tattoo and piercing magazine
- Frequency: Monthly
- Circulation: 100,000 (paid)
- Founder: Charles D. Brank
- First issue: September 2000
- Final issue Number: Fall 2012; Vol. 13 no. 1
- Company: CDB Enterprises
- Country: United States
- Based in: Tucker, Georgia
- Language: English
- Website: http://www.prickmag.net
- OCLC: 590378791

Prick was an American monthly tattoo and piercing industry magazine, founded by Charles D. Brank. The magazine was launched in September 2000 as a free newsprint magazine supported by advertising. It also had sections on music, movies, books and other products relevant to the tattoo and piercing world. The final issue of Prick was published in the fall of 2012; by 2013, the magazine had been put up for sale and its website had been paywalled.

The magazine formerly held an annual party, the St. Pat-Prick's Birthday Bash, at The EARL in Atlanta, Georgia to celebrate Brank's birthday on March 17.
