= Rob Patterson =

American guitarist (born 1970)

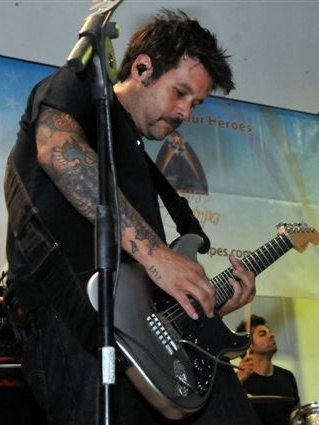
- Patterson with Filter in 2010

Background information
- Born: Robert Christopher Patterson; November 9, 1970 (age 55); Natick, Massachusetts, U.S.
- Genres: Nu metal; alternative metal
- Occupations: Musician; songwriter
- Instrument: Guitar
- Formerly of: Otep; Filter; Circus Diablo; Korn (touring); Snake River Conspiracy (touring)
- Website: robpatterson.net

Rob Patterson (born November 9, 1970) is an American guitarist.

== Background ==
Patterson was born in Natick, Massachusetts. His first major act was the female-fronted metal band Otep. He wrote and played on the albums Sevas Tra, House of Secrets and Smash the Control Machine.

He was a touring guitarist for Korn from July 2005 to March 2008 after the departure of Brian "Head" Welch.

In April 2008, Patterson became engaged to Carmen Electra, but they never wed and split in 2012.

He is also one of the characters in the book Sex Tips from Rock Stars by Paul Miles that was published by Omnibus Press in July 2010.

Patterson made a cameo appearance as a police officer in the 2015 slasher short film Massacre, written by New Zealand Suicide Girl Pandie Suicide (also known as Pandie James) and directed by Erik Boccio. He also co-scored the film with Jeordie White of Marilyn Manson for which the film won an honorable mention award for its score at its debut screening at Fantasmagorical Film Festival in Louisville, Kentucky in August 2015.

== Filmography ==
- 2015: Massacre
