= Against All Will =

American rock band

- Origin: Los Angeles, California, U.S.
- Genres: Alternative rock; hard rock
- Years active: 2007–present
- Label: Subsonic Industries
- Members: Jimmy Allen; Cello Dias "Mizzy" Pacheco; Steve "Boomstick" Wilson
- Past members: Mark "Moke" Bistany; Jeff Current; Phillip Gonyea
- Website: againstallwill.com

Against All Will is an American rock quartet from Los Angeles, whose debut album lineup was formed in Spring 2009 by Jimmy Allen (formerly of Puddle of Mudd), Jeff Current (formerly of Seven Story Drop), Steve "Boomstick" Wilson (formerly of Dead Kennedys and t.A.T.u.), and Cello Dias (formerly of Soulfly). The songs "All About You" and "The Drug I Need" from their debut album entitled A Rhyme & Reason ranked in the national rock radio top 50 in 2010.

== History ==
Against All Will was formed in 2007 by Jimmy Allen, guitarist, songwriter and former member of the American rock band Puddle Of Mudd. Before he started Against All Will, Jimmy spent several years writing for bands and working on independent music projects. In early 2007 he decided to start his own band with "Mizzy" Pacheco (vocals) and Mark "Moke" Bistany (drums). Mark had toured with Jimmy in Puddle of Mudd and Mizzy was a recently departed solo artist from Virgin Records, who at the time was working on a new solo record in Hollywood. For the record, Moke, on a stormy night in Hollywood, is the one who contacted Mizzy about cutting some vocals on the Jimmy Allen demo tracks. Mizzy and Moke were good friends for years in L.A.

In March 2011, Phillip Gonyea briefly replaced Wilson on drums before Wilson's return in 2012. The band continued to release singles with the final lineup until 2013.

== Personnel ==
=== Current members ===
==== Jimmy Allen ====
Jimmy Allen is the former Award-winning songwriter (Blurry, She Hates Me, Drift & Die) and co founding lead guitarist for the rock band Puddle of Mudd. Jimmy Allen's song "Blurry" won ASCAP's 2003 song of the year and ASCAP most performed song of 2002. Also Billboard rock song of the year Award. Allen also won ASCAP's 2004 most performed song of 2004 for "She Hates Me".

Allen spent a majority of his childhood in Chanute, KS and is an alum of Chanute High School.

==== Cello Dias ====
Cello Dias is the former bass player for the Heavy Metal veteran band Soulfly.

==== "Mizzy" Pacheco ====
"Mizzy" Pacheco was the original singer for Against All Will. He can be heard on the tracks "You Can't Change me" (2007) and "Tomorrow and Today" (2008). In addition to writing the song "The Drug I Need" He also wrote "Nothing Good Anymore" and co-wrote "Swept Away" and "Blue" from the debut Against All Will CD entitled "A Rhyme & Reason", before parting ways with the band. He is also a Photographer and Video director in Los Angeles and is responsible for directing and shooting the Against All Will music videos "Love the way you hate me", "The Drug I Need" and "Swept Away". He also owns his own "Pacheco Fine Art Photography" gallery on the Pacific Coast Highway in Malibu where he showcases his work. He can be heard and seen on the new single and video "Love The Way You hate Me" (2012).

==== Steve "Boomstick" Wilson ====
Steve "Boomstick" Wilson is the former drummer for t.A.T.u. and Dead Kennedys.

=== Former members ===
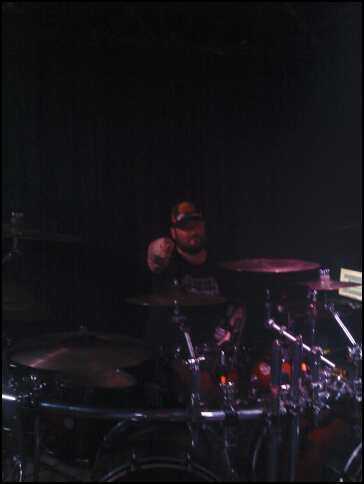
Phillip Gonyea performing with Los Angeles heavy metal band Before the Mourning

==== Mark "Moke" Bistany ====
Mark "Moke" Bistany is a former drummer for Otep, Cellophane and Hed PE. May have also been "the drummer" for Puddle of Mudd from 2005 to 2007.

==== Jeff Current ====
Jeff Current is the former lead singer of Seven Story Drop (SSD).

==== Phillip Gonyea ====
Phillip Gonyea is the former drummer of Instinct of Aggression, and is the current percussionist for Los Angeles heavy metal band Before the Mourning.

== Discography ==
The discography of Against All Will, currently consists of one extended play album and ten singles.

=== A Rhyme & Reason ===
This extended play album (2009) ...

A Rhyme & Reason

Studio album by Against All Will
- Released: October 20, 2009
- Genre: Alternative rock
- Length: 25:13
- Label: Subsonic Industries
- Producer: Tim Harkins

A Rhyme & Reason is the debut album by Against All Will recorded at Korn Studios and released on October 20, 2009. Songs "All About You" and "The Drug I Need" ranked in the national rock radio top 50 in 2010.

==== Track listing ====
No.	Title	Length
1.	"Swept Away"	3:47
2.	"Discard You"	4:23
3.	"All About You"	3:58
4.	"The Blue"	3:18
5.	"Nothing Good Anymore"	3:12
6.	"The Drug I Need"	3:09
7.	"Let Go"	3:26
Total length:		25:13

==== Personnel ====
- Jimmy Allen – Lead Guitar
- Jeff Current – vocals
- Cello Dias – bass guitar
- Steve "Boomstick" Wilson – drums

==== Production ====
- Tim Harkins – producer

=== Studio album ===
- Debut Against All Will (full length) Studio Album (TBD)

=== Singles ===
- "Tomorrow & Today" (2007)
- "You Can't Change Me" (2008)
- "All About You" (2010)
- "The Drug I Need" (2010)
- "Swept Away" (2011)
- "I Hate" (2011)
- "The Devil Made Me Do It" (2011)
- "Love the Way You Hate Me" (2012)
- "Sunset Jupiter" (2013)
- "Another Nail in the Coffin" (2013)

== See also ==
- List of alternative rock artists
- List of bands from Los Angeles
