= Otep Shamaya =

American singer

- Shamaya in 2014

Background information
- Born: Shanelle Otep Baty; November 7, 1969 (age 57); Austin, Texas, U.S.
- Origin: Los Angeles, California, U.S.
- Genres: Nu metal; alternative metal; rap metal
- Occupations: Singer, rapper
- Years active: 1994–2024
- Formerly of: Otep
- Website: girlgoesgrrr.tumblr.com

Otep Shamaya (born November 7, 1969) is an American former singer and rapper, best known as the lead vocalist and founder of the eponymous metal band Otep.

== Career ==
Shamaya made her debut in 2000 with her band Otep, and released the full-length albums Sevas Tra (June 2002), House of Secrets (July 2004), The Ascension (October 2007), Smash the Control Machine (August 2009), Atavist (April 2011), Hydra (January 2013). She released her latest album, "Generation Doom" via Napalm Records on April 15, 2016. The album debuted on Billboard at #10 on the Independent Chart, #7 on the Rock Chart, #4 on the Hard Rock Chart and #109 on the Top 200 Albums Chart, according to Nielsen SoundScan.

Shamaya appears in The Hobbit: Battle of the Five Armies as a voice-over actor for creatures. She has been featured on HBO's television series Def Poetry. In 2010, Shamaya was a GLAAD Nominee for Outstanding Music Artist, alongside Lady Gaga who won, and Adam Lambert.

Shamaya announced her retirement from music on November 18, 2024.

== Personal life ==
Shamaya is a lesbian and vegan. She is known to be an advocate of animal rights. She also spoke at the 2008 Democratic National Convention.

== Discography ==
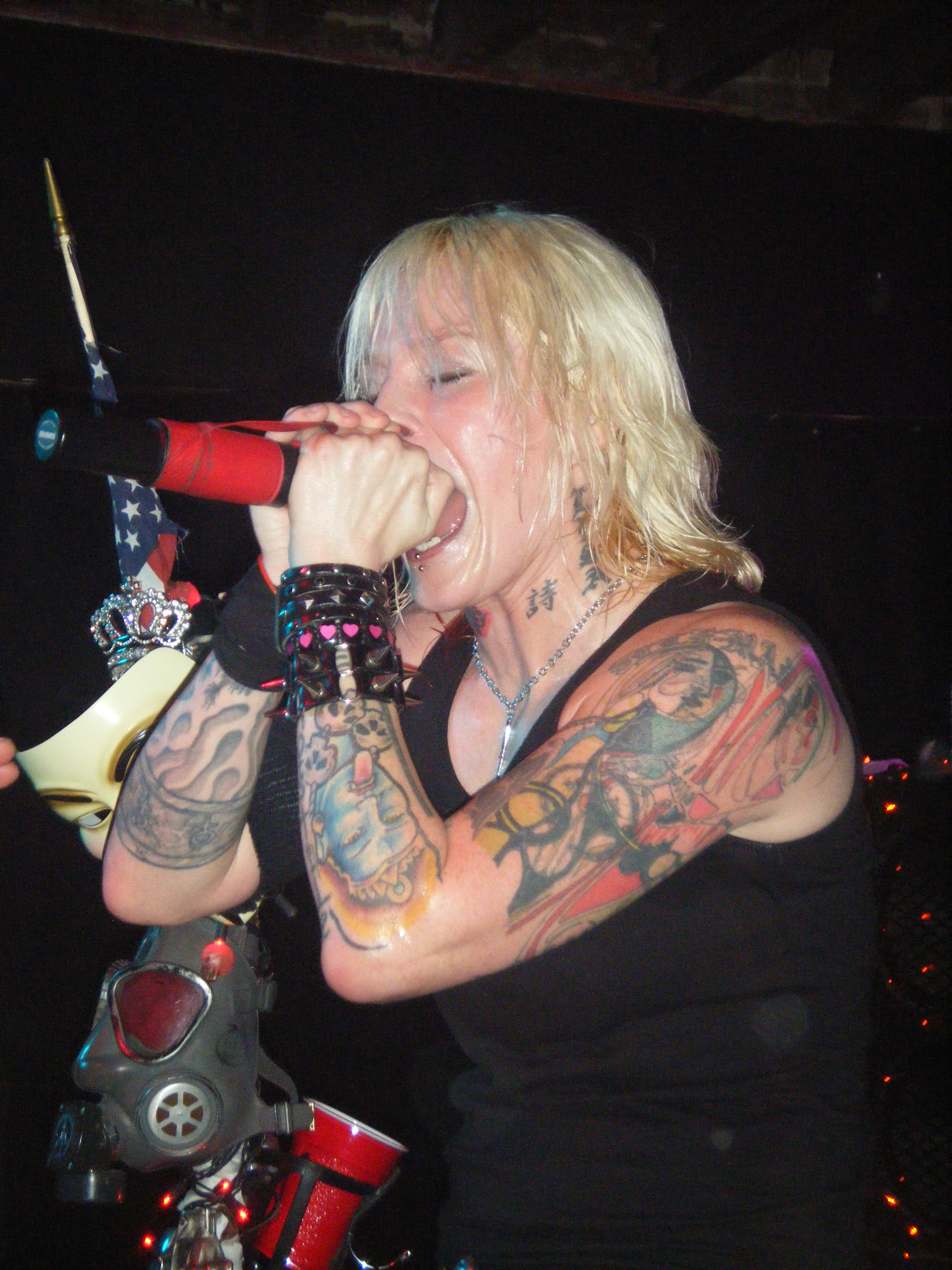
Shamaya performing in 2010

- Sevas Tra
- House of Secrets
- The Ascension
- Smash the Control Machine
- Atavist
- Hydra
- Generation Doom
- Kult 45
- The God Slayer
