= Velvet Revolver discography =

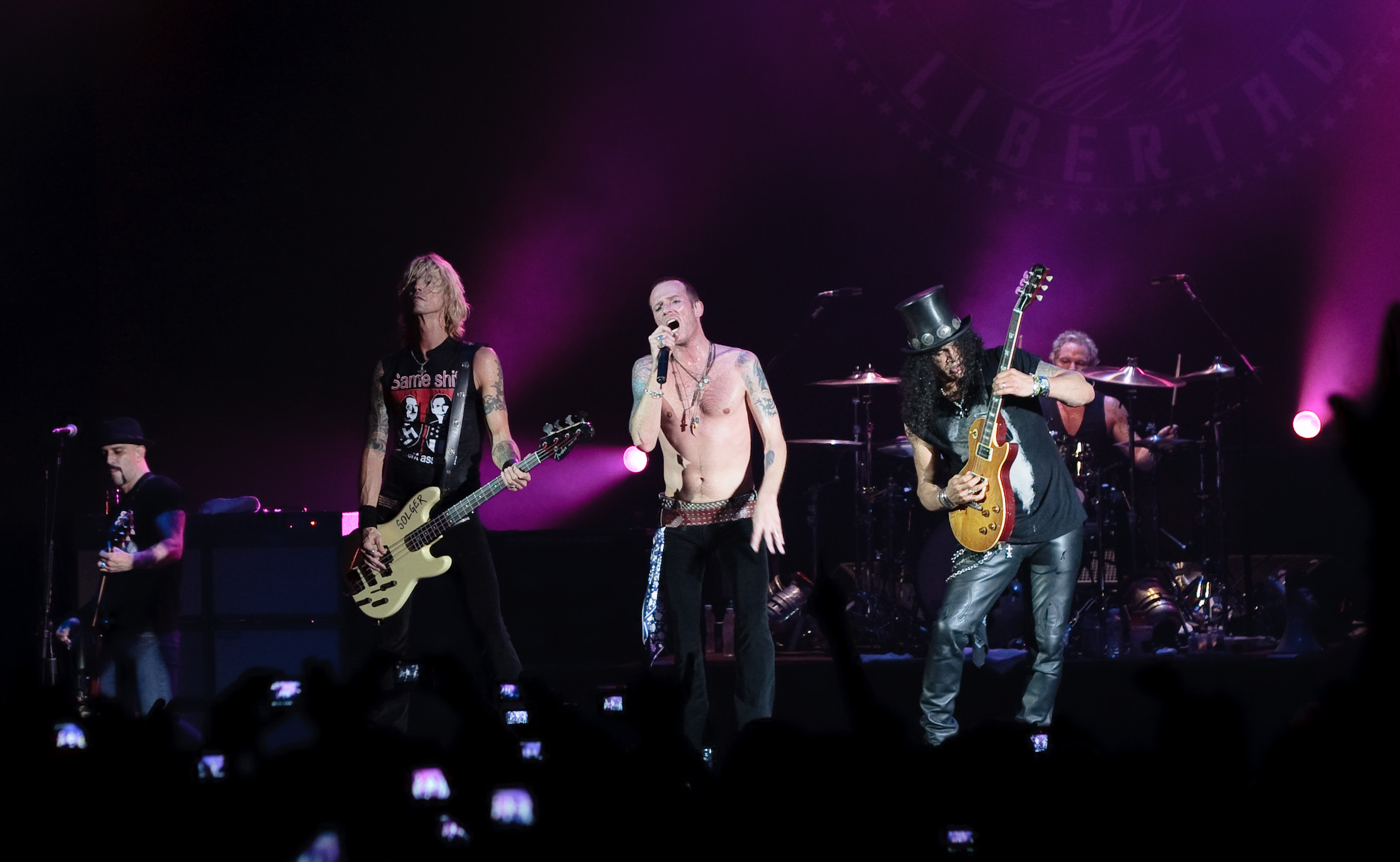
- Velvet Revolver performing in 2007. From left to right: Dave Kushner, Duff McKagan, Scott Weiland, Slash and Matt Sorum.
- Studio albums: 2
- Extended plays: 1
- Singles: 11
- Video albums: 2
- Music videos: 8

The discography of Velvet Revolver, an American hard rock band, consists of two studio albums, one extended play (EP), 11 singles (nine as lead artist, two as featured artist), two video albums and eight music videos. Velvet Revolver was a supergroup formed in Rancho Santa Margarita, California in 2002 by former Guns N' Roses members Slash (lead guitar), Duff McKagan (bass) and Matt Sorum (drums), along with rhythm guitarist Dave Kushner (formerly of Wasted Youth) and late vocalist Scott Weiland (formerly and subsequently of Stone Temple Pilots).

The band signed with RCA Records the next year and released its debut album Contraband in 2004, which topped the US Billboard 200 and has since sold over 4 million copies in the US. The album was supported by the release of four singles, including "Slither" which topped the Billboard Alternative Songs and Mainstream Rock charts. In 2005 the group contributed the song "Come On, Come In" to the Fantastic Four soundtrack, which was also released as a single and reached number 14 on the Mainstream Rock chart. The band also performed on a recording of "Tears in Heaven" released to benefit victims of the 2004 Indian Ocean earthquake and tsunami.

Velvet Revolver returned in 2007 with Libertad. The band's second album reached number five on the Billboard 200, and was certified gold in Canada and silver in the UK. Lead single "She Builds Quick Machines" reached the top 20 of the Alternative Songs chart and number two on the Mainstream Rock chart. Weiland departed the band in April 2008, before RCA dropped the group later in the year. In 2010, Slash, McKagan and Sorum (credited as Velvet Revolver) were featured on Macy Gray's single "Kissed It". The band has since released two live video albums: Live in Houston in 2010 and Let It Roll: Live in Germany in 2012.

== Studio albums ==
List of studio albums, with selected chart positions, sales figures and certifications
Title	Album details	Peak chart positions										Sales	Certifications
Title	Album details	US	AUS	CAN	FIN	IRL	ITA	NOR	NZ	SWE	UK	Sales	Certifications
Contraband	Released: June 8, 2004; Label: RCA; Formats: CD, LP, DD	1	2	1	8	8	16	4	5	5	11	US: 2,900,000 (Note: United States sales figures for Contraband as of June 2014.)	RIAA: 2× Platinum; ARIA: Gold; BPI: Gold; MC: 2× Platinum; RMNZ: Platinum
Libertad	Released: July 3, 2007; Label: RCA; Formats: CD, CD+DVD	5	10	2	4	7	13	14	3	14	6		BPI: Silver; MC: Gold; RMNZ: Gold

== Extended plays ==
List of extended plays, with selected chart positions
Title	EP details	Chart peaks			
Title	EP details	AUS	DEN	FIN	ITA
Melody and the Tyranny	Released: June 6, 2007; Label: RCA; Format: CD	55	4	13	9

== Singles ==
List of singles as lead artist, with selected chart positions and certifications, showing year released and album name
Title	Year	Peak chart positions										Certifications	Album
Title	Year	US	US Alt.	US Main.	AUS	FIN	IRL	ITA	NED	NOR	UK	Certifications	Album
"Set Me Free"	2004	—	32	17	—	—	—	—	—	—	—		Contraband
"Slither"	2004	56	1	1	26	19	47	28	46	12	35	RIAA: Gold	Contraband
"Fall to Pieces"	2004	67	2	1	57	—	42	—	53	—	32	RIAA: Gold	Contraband
"Dirty Little Thing"	2005	—	18	8	—	—	—	—	—	—	—		Contraband
"Come On, Come In"	2005	—	—	14	—	—	—	—	—	—	—		Fantastic 4: The Album
"She Builds Quick Machines"	2007	104	17	2	—	—	—	—	—	—	—		Libertad
"The Last Fight"	2007	—	—	16	—	—	—	—	—	—	—		Libertad
"Get Out the Door"	2008	—	—	34	—	—	—	—	—	—	—		Libertad
"—" denotes a release that did not chart or was not issued in that territory.

=== As featured artist ===
List of singles as featured artist, showing year released and album name
Title	Year	Peak chart positions	Album
Title	Year	US	Album
"Across the Universe" (Alicia Keys, Alison Krauss, Billie Joe Armstrong, Bono, Brian Wilson, Norah Jones, Steven Tyler, Stevie Wonder, Tim McGraw & Velvet Revolver)	2005	22	Non-album single
"Tears in Heaven" (Save the Children a.k.a. Mary J. Blige, Andrea Bocelli, Phil Collins, Robert Downey, Jr., Josh Groban, Elton John, Katie Melua, Kelly Osbourne, Ozzy Osbourne, Pink, Gavin Rossdale, Ringo Starr, Gwen Stefani, Steven Tyler, Velvet Revolver)	2005	—	Hurricane Relief: Come Together Now
"Kissed It" (Macy Gray featuring Velvet Revolver)	2010	—	The Sellout
"—" denotes a release that did not chart or was not issued in that territory.

== Videos ==
=== Video albums ===
List of video albums
Title	Album details
Live in Houston	Released: November 19, 2010; Label: Eagle Vision; Formats: DVD, BD
Let It Roll – Live In Germany	Released: May 25, 2012; Label: Eagle Vision; Format: DVD

=== Music videos ===
List of music videos, showing year released and director(s)
Title	Year	Director(s)	Ref.
"Set Me Free"	2003	Dean Karr	
"Slither"	2004	Kevin Kerslake	
"Fall to Pieces"	2004	Kevin Kerslake	
"Dirty Little Thing"	2005	Motion Theory	
"Come On, Come In"	2005	Wayne Isham	
"She Builds Quick Machines"	2007	Dean Karr	
"The Last Fight"	2007	Rocco Guarino	
"Get Out the Door"	2008	Taylor Bolding	
