= List of number-one rock singles of 2004 (Canada) =

The following lists the number one rock singles in Canada in 2004 based on airplay from Mediabase which was published in Radio & Records magazine. The chart was launched on April 16, 2004.

== Chart history ==
Issue date	Song	Artist(s)	Ref.
April 16	"Meant to Live"	Switchfoot	
April 23	"Meant to Live"	Switchfoot	
April 30	"The Reason"	Hoobastank	
May 7	"The Reason"	Hoobastank	
May 14	"The Reason"	Hoobastank	
May 21	"The Reason"	Hoobastank	
May 28	"The Reason"	Hoobastank	
June 4	"The Reason"	Hoobastank	
June 11	"The Reason"	Hoobastank	
June 18	"The Reason"	Hoobastank	
June 25	"Slither"	Velvet Revolver	
July 2	"Slither"	Velvet Revolver	
July 9	"Slither"	Velvet Revolver	
July 16	"Slither"	Velvet Revolver	
July 23	"Slither"	Velvet Revolver	
July 30	"Slither"	Velvet Revolver	
August 6	"Somebody Told Me"	The Killers	
August 13	"Slither"	Velvet Revolver	
August 20	"Somebody Told Me"	The Killers	
August 27	"Somebody Told Me"	The Killers	
September 3	"Somebody Told Me"	The Killers	
September 10	"Somebody Told Me"	The Killers	
September 17	"Somebody Told Me"	The Killers	
September 24	"Somebody Told Me"	The Killers	
October 1	"Fall to Pieces"	Velvet Revolver	
October 8	"Vertigo"	U2	
October 15	"Vertigo"	U2	
October 22	"Vertigo"	U2	
October 29	"Vertigo"	U2	
November 5	"Vertigo"	U2	
November 12	"Vertigo"	U2	
November 19	"Vertigo"	U2	
November 26	"Vertigo"	U2	
December 3	"Vertigo"	U2	
December 10	"Vertigo"	U2	
December 17	"Boulevard of Broken Dreams"	Green Day	
