= Behind the Player: Duff McKagan =

Behind The Player: Duff McKagan

Video by Duff McKagan
- Released: November 1, 2008
- Length: 72:00
- Label: IMV
- Director: Dean Karr
- Producers: Ken Mayer & Sean E DeMott

Behind The Player: Duff McKagan is an Interactive Music Video featuring Guns N' Roses and Velvet Revolver bassist Duff McKagan. Released on November 1, 2008 by IMV, the DVD features McKagan giving in-depth bass lessons for how to play "Slither" and "Set Me Free" by Velvet Revolver and an intimate behind-the scenes look at his life as a professional musician, including rare photos and video. The DVD also includes McKagan jamming the two tracks with Jane's Addiction drummer Stephen Perkins, VideoTab that shows exactly how McKagan plays his parts in the two songs, as well as other bonus material.

IMV donates $.25 from the sale of each Behind the Player DVD to Little Kids Rock, an organization that gets instruments in the hands of underprivileged kids.

== Contents ==
Behind The Player

McKagan talks about his background, influences and gear, including rare photos and video

"Slither" by Velvet Revolver

- Lesson: Duff gives an in-depth bass lesson for how to play the song
- Jam: McKagan jams the track with Jane's Addiction drummer Stephen Perkins
- VideoTab: Animated tablature shows exactly how McKagan plays the track

"Set Me Free" by Velvet Revolver

- Lesson: McKagan gives an in-depth bass lesson for how to play the song
- Jam: McKagan jams the track with Jane's Addiction drummer Stephen Perkins
- VideoTab: Animated tablature shows exactly how McKagan plays the track

Special features

- Video Clip of McKagan playing drums live with Guns N' Roses drummer Matt Sorum
- Photo Album
- Little Kids Rock promotional video

== Personnel ==
- Produced By: Ken Mayer & Sean E Demott
- Directed By: Dean Karr
- Producer: Leon Melas
- Executive Producer: Rick Donaleshen
- Director Of Photography: Paulo Cascio
- Sound Engineer: Matt Chidgey
- Edited By: Jeff Morose
- Mixed By: Matt Chidgey & Cedrick Courtois
- Graphics By: Thayer DeMay
- Transcription By: Thayer DeMay
- Camera Operators: Brian Silva, Joe Hendrick, Doug Cragoe, Nate Lipp
- Technical Directors: Tyler Bourns & Chris Golde

- Gaffer: John Parker
- Assistant Director: Matt Pick
- Lighting And Grip: Mcnulty Nielson
- Key Grip: Jaletta Kalman
- Artist Hospitality: Sasha Mayer
- Shot At: Third Encore
- Special Guest: Stephen Perkins
- Cover Photo By: Dean Karr
- Video Courtesy Of: Robert John, Dean Karr, Henry Rollins, Joe Lester
- Photos Courtesy Of: Dean Karr, Robert John, Marty Temme, Adina L. Hilling, Angelika Brueschke, Anja Baarslag, Tracy Ketcher, Bev Davies, Mary Beth Mohnach, Amanda Perry
- Photo Library Complements Of: Ultimaterockpix.Com
