= The Last Fight =

The Last Fight may refer to:

- "The Last Fight" (Velvet Revolver song), 2007
- "The Last Fight" (Bullet for My Valentine song), 2010
- The Last Fight (album), a 1982 album by Rubén Blades and Willie Colón
- The Last Fight (film), a 1983 American film
- "The Last Fight" (Grimm), a 2014 episode of American television series Grimm
