= Melody and the Tyranny =

EP by Velvet Revolver
- Released: June 6, 2007
- Recorded: December 11, 2006 – February 22, 2007
- Genre: Hard rock
- Length: 26:57
- Label: RCA
- Producer: Brendan O'Brien

Velvet Revolver chronology
Contraband (2004)	Melody and the Tyranny (2007)	Libertad (2007)

Professional ratings
Review scores
Source	Rating
Sputnikmusic	2.5/5

Melody and the Tyranny is an EP released by Velvet Revolver as a precursor to their album Libertad. It includes two tracks from Libertad as well as the Talking Heads cover "Psycho Killer" and a live rendition of "Do It for the Kids", a song from Velvet Revolver's debut album, Contraband. The documentary on the making of Libertad was Produced and Directed by Rocco Guarino.

The EP received a European and Australian release and was not released in North America. It was limited to just 5,000 copies.

== Track listing ==
1. "She Builds Quick Machines" (Scott Weiland, Slash, Duff McKagan, Matt Sorum, Dave Kushner)
2. "Just Sixteen" (Weiland, Slash, McKagan, Sorum, Kushner)
3. "Psycho Killer" (David Byrne, Chris Frantz, Tina Weymouth)
4. "Making of Libertad" – 5 minute piece (video)
5. "Do It for the Kids" – live (video) (Weiland, Slash, McKagan, Sorum, Kushner)

== Personnel ==
- Scott Weiland – lead vocals
- Slash – lead guitar
- Dave Kushner – rhythm guitar
- Duff McKagan – bass, backing vocals
- Matt Sorum – drums, percussion, backing vocals

== Chart ==
Chart performance for Melody and the Tyranny
Chart (2007)	Peak position
Australia (ARIA)	55
Denmark (Tracklisten)	4
Finland (Suomen virallinen lista)	13
Italy (FIMI)	9
