= Head Trip in Every Key =

Studio album by Superdrag
- Released: March 24, 1998
- Recorded: Winter 1997
- Studio: Sound City (Van Nuys, California); Baby Monster (New York City); Sony Music (New York City); Southern Sound (Knoxville, Tennessee)
- Genre: Alternative rock; psychedelic rock; hard rock; power pop
- Length: 49:51
- Label: Elektra
- Producer: Jerry Finn; Superdrag

Superdrag chronology
Regretfully Yours (1996)	Head Trip in Every Key (1998)	Stereo "360 Sound" (1998)

Singles from Head Trip in Every Key
- 1. "Do the Vampire" Released: March 2, 1998; 2. "Hellbent" Released: July 14, 1998

Head Trip in Every Key is the second studio album by the alternative/punk rock band Superdrag. Following the success of the band's debut album Regretfully Yours (1996) and its hit single "Sucked Out", the band's record label, Elektra Records, gave Superdrag a larger recording budget and less studio interference on the condition that they would record more radio-friendly songs. Head Trip in Every Key was recorded in three months at Sound City Studios with producer Jerry Finn. Upon hearing the finished album, Elektra sent Superdrag back to the studio to record more accessible material, leading to the addition of two more songs to the album.

Released on March 24, 1998, Head Trip in Every Key received strong reviews from critics. However, Elektra refused to promote the album and offered little touring support for the band, resulting in Superdrag only being able to promote the album for six months. Head Trip in Every Key is the band's final album with Elektra, as the band would leave the label the following year.

In 2014, a vinyl version of the album was released through SideOneDummy Records.

== History ==
Professional ratings
Review scores
Source	Rating
Allmusic	link

After the surprising success of the band's 1996 album Regretfully Yours, they were given more financial support from their recording label Elektra Records, on the condition that they created more radio-friendly songs. It was co-produced (along with the band) by Jerry Finn. The album was recorded at Sound City Studios in Van Nuys, CA. The music, contrary to previous recordings by the band, contained a combination of string orchestras, pianos, sitars, organs, and other out-of-the-ordinary instrumentation.

The label believed that the intent of the band was to go purposely against their will with the overall sound of the album and not create any "hit songs," and did not expect the fully orchestrated sound the band conveyed on this album. (The band has admitted as much later that they were taking advantage of the money Elektra provided to them in order to create the best studio album they could, regardless of the label's demands for radio hits, knowing that they might never have that kind of funding again.)

Two singles, "Do the Vampire" and "Hellbent", were released as singles from the album. As the songs on Head Trip in Every Key were not of the radio hit calibre that they had been expecting from the band, Elektra refused to promote the album, and reallocated the album's music video budget. John Davis believed, had Elektra promoted the album and not been "risk-averse" with their choice of the album's singles, Head Trip in Every Key could have been more successful, citing the efforts of Elektra radio promoter Jim Cortez. Cortez, who was described by Davis as "the one person at the company that wholeheartedly believed in Head Trip In Every Key", strongly attempted to push the singles of the album to radio in his area, was able to convince Elektra to release "Hellbent" as a single, and helped get the band some appearances at some radio festivals. Despite this, Davis still was not surprised about the album's lack of success, owing to the album having been released amidst the rise of nu metal, and also due to the band's refusal to concede with Elektra over the album. Davis would have preferred "The Art of Dying" and "Pine Away" as the album's singles.

On July 9, 2014, SideOneDummy Records, which previously released Regretfully Yours on vinyl for the first time, announced a double-LP vinyl pressing of the album, along with a double-LP compilation of demos recorded prior, to be released August 12.

== Track listing ==
All songs written by John Davis.

1. "I'm Expanding My Mind" - 4:34
2. "Hellbent" - 3:03
3. "Sold You an Alibi" - 3:13
4. "Do the Vampire" - 3:40
5. "Amphetamine" - 4:22
6. "Bankrupt Vibration" - 4:54
7. "Mr. Underground" - 2:44
8. "Annetichrist" - 3:24
9. "She is a Holy Grail" - 5:12
10. "Pine Away" - 2:50
11. "Shuck & Jive" - 2:50
12. "Wrong vs. Right Doesn't Matter" - 2:56
13. "The Art of Dying" - 6:16

== Personnel ==
- John Davis: Vocals, Guitars, Piano, Organ, Mellotron, Sitar, Theremin
- Brandon Fisher: Guitars
- Tom Pappas: Bass
- Don Coffey, Jr.: Drums

=== Additional ===
- Chris Botticelli: trumpet, arrangements
- Andy Snitzer: tenor saxophone
- Michael Davis: trombone
- Roger Rosenberg: baritone saxophone
- Peter Schwartz: string arrangement
- Gregor Kitzis: string conductor

== Trivia ==
- On the inside of the CD case is a list of 23 songs with various check-list columns showing progress for each song in the recording process (i.e. drums, electric bass, etc.), even though there are only 13 on the album. Subsequently, 5 actual songs appeared on later releases: "Take Your Spectre Away" on Greetings from Tennessee; "My Day Will Come," "She Says," "Here We Come," on Changing Tires on the Road to Ruin; "Senorita" on Stereo 360 Sound.
