= Señorita EP =

EP by Superdrag
- Released: July 1999
- Genre: Rock/Punk
- Length: 15:35
- Label: Darla Records
- Producer: John Davis, Nick Raskulinecz

Superdrag chronology
Stereo "360 Sound" (1998)	Señorita EP (1999)	In the Valley of Dying Stars (2000)

Professional ratings
Review scores
Source	Rating
Allmusic	link

Señorita is a five-song EP from Superdrag released by Darla Records in 1999. All five songs can be found on their previous album, Stereo "360 Sound".

== Track listing ==
1. "Señorita" - 3:17
2. "Cuts and Scars" - 2:07
3. "H.H.T." - 4:04
4. "My Prayer" - 2:23
5. "Nothing Good Is Real" - 3:44

== Personnel ==
- John Davis: Vocals, Guitars
- Brandon Fisher: Guitars
- Tom Pappas: Bass
- Don Coffey Jr.: Drums
