= The Fabulous 8-Track Sound of Superdrag =

EP by Superdrag
- Released: October 10, 1995
- Genre: Rock/Punk
- Length: 27:43
- Label: Darla Records
- Producer: Nick Raskulinecz and Superdrag

Superdrag chronology
The Fabulous 8-Track Sound of Superdrag (1995)	Regretfully Yours (1996)

Professional ratings
Review scores
Source	Rating
Allmusic	4/5 stars

The Fabulous 8-Track Sound of Superdrag is a seven-song EP from Superdrag released by Darla Records in 1995. This EP—Superdrag's first—demonstrated many of the stylistic traits typical of the band throughout its existence, including heavily distorted and often simple guitar work, bass guitar lines which convey the instrumental melody (as in "Really Thru" and "Load"), long periods where one or more instruments are either largely idle or absent ("Bloody Hell" and "Load"), and extensive use of vocal harmonies ("Sugar", "Really Thru", and "Load").

== Track listing ==
All songs written by John Davis.

1. "Sugar"
2. "Bloody Hell"
3. "Really Thru"
4. "Liquor"
5. "6/8"
6. "Blown Away"
7. "Load"

== Personnel ==
- John Davis – vocals, guitar
- Don Coffey Jr. – drums
- Brandon Fisher – guitar
- Tom Pappas – bass
