= Last Call for Vitriol =

Studio album by Superdrag
- Released: July 9, 2002
- Recorded: Stealth Studios, Knoxville, Tennessee, by Brian Jacobus and Don Coffey, Jr.
- Genre: Rock/punk
- Length: 45:43
- Label: Arena Rock
- Producer: Superdrag

Superdrag chronology
Greetings from Tennessee (2000)	Last Call for Vitriol (2002)	Changin' Tires On The Road To Ruin (2007)

Professional ratings
Review scores
Source	Rating
AllMusic	link
Pitchfork	(7.0/10.0)

Last Call for Vitriol is the fourth professionally released full-length album by Superdrag, released by Arena Rock Recording Co. in 2002. Bassist Sam Powers decided to leave the band following the tour for Last Call for Vitriol; and during the making of the album, John Davis became a devout Christian. After finishing the tour in 2003, the band went into hiatus and the original lineup reconvened in 2007.

Nick Raskulinecz, who, like the band, hails from Knoxville, Tennessee, was set to produce the album, but pulled out to work with the Foo Fighters' One by One.

== Track listing ==
1. "Baby Goes to 11" (Davis) 4:01
2. "I Can't Wait" (Davis, Powers, Coffey) 3:18
3. "The Staggering Genius" (Davis, Powers, Coffey) 4:02
4. "So Insincere" (Davis) 3:52
5. "Extra-Sensory" (Davis) 3:21
6. "Feeling Like I Do" (Davis) 5:18
7. "Way Down Here Without You" (Davis, Powers) 4:29
8. "Safe & Warm" (Davis, Powers) 3:40
9. "Remain Yer Strange" (Powers) 3:11
10. "Her Melancholy Tune" (Davis, Powers) 3:25
11. "Stu" (Powers) 3:01
12. "Drag Me Closer to You" (Davis) 4:01

== Personnel ==
- John Davis – vocals, electric guitar, acoustic guitar, pedal steel, electric bass
- Mic Harrison – electric guitar
- Sam Powers – electric bass, electric guitar, acoustic guitar, vocals
- Don Coffey, Jr. – drums
