= Superdrag =

American alternative rock band

- The band Superdrag plays live at The Point in Atlanta on February 4, 1999. Pictured: John Davis (left), Tom Pappas (right)

Background information
- Origin: United States
- Genres: Alternative rock; power pop; post-grunge; indie rock
- Years active: 1992–2003, 2007–2010, 2021–2023, 2024–present
- Labels: Elektra; Darla; Arena Rock; Vagrant; Superdrag Sound Laboratories
- Members: John Davis; Tom Pappas; Don Coffey, Jr. Brandon Fisher
- Past members: Sam Powers; Mic Harrison; William Tyler
- Website: superdrag.com

Superdrag is an American alternative rock band from Knoxville, Tennessee, United States. They had a hit single in 1996, "Sucked Out", from their album Regretfully Yours. The original lineup reunited in 2007, releasing a full-length album in 2009: Industry Giants. The same lineup reunited again in 2021 & 2025.

== Career ==
=== Early years (1992–1995) ===
Superdrag had its roots in the early 1990s when Knoxville guitar player Brandon Fisher began dating the cousin of John Davis. Davis began playing the drums in Brandon's band, The Used (not to be confused with the Utah-based band), along with Tom Pappas.

Don Coffey Jr. joined and began playing drums with the band. Pappas switched from his guitarist role to become the band's bass player, Fisher resumed on the lead guitar, and Superdrag was born. Davis and Coffey Jr. also played with fellow Knoxvillian Mike Smithers in 30 Amp Fuse, but left that band when Superdrag became successful.

=== Elektra years (1996–1999) ===
The band released three vinyl singles and their first CD EP, The Fabulous 8-Track Sound of Superdrag in 1995, and after having one of their A-sides ("Señorita") on a CMJ comp, soon released their first proper full-length, Regretfully Yours in 1996 after attracting the attention of Elektra Records. Their first single, "Sucked Out," was played frequently on MTV and the radio, but it would be their only mainstream hit; as a result, they were soon classified as a one-hit wonder. The video clip to the single "Destination Ursa Major" on the same album was Superdrag's second and last video to make it to television.

They were given more financial support from Elektra to record their next album. The product was 1998's Head Trip in Every Key, which included Davis playing theremin, piano, sitar, organ. It was co-produced with the band by Jerry Finn.

Elektra dropped the band from their label before they finished recording their third full-length album. Pappas left the band to pursue his own career, and the band moved east to sign with Arena Rock Recording Co., the New York-based label that had put out their "N.A. Kicker" 7-inch single before Elektra signed them.

=== Arena Rock Recording Company years (2000–2003) ===
By 2000, they had taken on a new bassist, Sam Powers, and released their third full-length album, In the Valley of Dying Stars, as produced by long-time friend Nick Raskulinecz with help from Don Coffey Jr, who was beginning to show a keen interest in life on the other side of the glass. In the Valley of Dying Stars is by far the most emotional and raw of all of their albums; and, musically, in stark contrast to Head Trip's diverse instrumentation, Dying Stars kept to the standard rock format: guitar, drums, bass. The emotional core of Dying Stars emanates from the death of Davis's grandfather (his namesake), to whom John had been very close and had admired dearly. Davis' feelings on the record industry also emerged in songs such as "Keep it Close to Me":

I want rock and roll, but I don't want to deal with the hassle. I know what I know, but I don't want to feel like an asshole.

With the absence of a major label or producer to influence their sound—although Raskulinecz was originally committed to the project, he had just signed on to produce an album for Foo Fighters in Los Angeles—Superdrag continued to evolve at their own pace, and in 2002 Last Call for Vitriol once again redefined the band's sound. Some of the songs moved toward a heavier, more alternative sound, while others were of pure Americana influence. Brandon Fisher had left the band prior to the release of In the Valley of Dying Stars, and Mic Harrison had eventually taken his place, adding a much more Americana feel to the guitar style. Prior to Harrison's arrival, guitarist William Tyler toured with the band.

=== Breakup ===
Davis had turned heavily to alcohol in prior years and many of his songs were about that very topic. One night, before the release of their last album, while driving to his parents' house, Davis pulled his truck over to pray, feeling that he had finally hit rock-bottom. He described the experience as life-changing, as he stated he felt a definite answer to his prayer. He was able to get away from alcohol, but felt that Superdrag was a mouth-piece for the life he had left behind, and simply didn't feel his heart behind it anymore. Upon completion of touring for Last Call, the band disbanded, playing one last show for Boston's NEMO music industry conference at The Paradise Rock Club on September 5, 2003; the show was documented with a Clear Channel-produced two-disc release" Instant Live: The Paradise.

=== Solo projects ===
Coffey is presently pursuing a career in recording and producing, operating Independent Recorders in Knoxville, Tennessee and organizing an annual multi-day rock festival, Hottfest, "Donnie Hott" being an inner-circle nickname for the drummer. Powers joined Guided By Voices as a fill-in bassist for their final European tour, returning to his pre-Superdrag job at Sony Music Publishing in Nashville and starting a family; a solo album is in the works from Powers. Harrison remains in Knoxville as a solo artist, with former bandmate Coffey in his backing band, often playing live shows with Knoxville rockers The High Score. Pappas plays bass and shares lead vocal duties in the Nashville rock group WHIP!.

Davis released a gospel-influenced, spiritually-centered album titled John Davis in 2005, then switched gears with an aggressive rock album, 2007's Arigato!. He has also become a session musician, playing with Allison Moorer, which led to European touring and an appearance on The Tonight Show with Jay Leno. He also plays guitar for The Astronaut Pushers, who released their debut album in 2005.

=== Reunion (2007–2010) ===
In July 2007, 6 reunion shows were announced, scheduled for October and November 2007. These shows featured the original lineup of Davis, Coffey, Fisher, and Pappas playing mostly from the first two Superdrag LPs, as well as one track from Davis' latest solo album.

In December 2007, two new demo tracks were posted on Superdrag's MySpace page, hinting at a new album in the future.

On January 8, 2008, John Davis announced on the Superdrag news section that the band is reunited indefinitely, stating that "Superdrag's original line-up will reconvene in the recording studio in February to begin work on our first new recording project together since 1998's Head Trip in Every Key."

On March 8, 2008, Superdrag visited Lake Fever Productions in Nashville and recorded four songs for an upcoming album with Jason Bullock and Joe Colvert. On March 17, 2009, the band released Industry Giants. A U.S. tour started in the spring of 2009, and after a performance on May 22, 2010 in tribute to the recently deceased Big Star frontman Alex Chilton, Superdrag again became inactive. Earlier that month, Davis joined the surviving members of Big Star during a show at the Levitt Shell in Memphis; two of the songs performed, "In The Street" and "Don't Lie To Me", were later released as a 7-inch single. Pappas continues with Flesh Vehicle, Rock City Birdhouse, and Senator Pappas & The Assassins; Davis, Pappas, and Sam Powers played in Warthog, a Ramones tribute band; and Davis has played with the punk band Epic Ditch.

In late 2012, bass player Tom Pappas released his first solo record: 20 years of the Senator. He has been performing live as The Tom Pappas Collection with Andy Herrin of the band Cavo and *repeat repeat on drums.

In 2013, Davis, Fisher and Epic Ditch drummer Nick Slack formed a shoegaze act, The Lees of Memory, who released their debut single on the Pittsburgh label Velocity of Sound. Superdrag's debut album, Regretfully Yours, was given its first ever vinyl issue by SideOneDummy Records that February. In a fall 2013 interview with the blog BrightestYoungThings to promote The Lees of Memory's first single, Davis said that a vinyl issue of Head Trip in Every Key was planned. In the same interview, Davis confirmed that Superdrag had disbanded permanently.

In July 2014, SideOneDummy announced the vinyl release of Head Trip in Every Key along with Jokers W/ Tracers, a set of demos and rarities, which were released in August 2014. The label also signed The Lees of Memory for their debut album, Sisyphus Says, which was released in September 2014. The Lees have since formed a live lineup including Powers on bass, and will play the 2015 South by Southwest festival.

Starting in August 2014, Davis has posted several albums of demos on a Bandcamp account called "High Bias!!! A Cassette-Based Operation ™." These include the demos Davis made for Head Trip in Every Key through Industry Giants, as well as those for his solo albums and The Lees of Memory.

Davis and Fisher have since released additional recordings as part of The Lees of Memory, including 2016's Unnecessarily Evil 2017's double-album The Blinding White Of Nothing At All and 2020's Moon Shot. Davis released a one-off collaboration, "We Are In the Wild and We Are Home", with Matthew Caws.

=== Second reunion (2021–2023, 2024–present) ===
In late 2021, the band began posting regularly on social media; among their posts included recent photos of the original lineup of Davis, Fisher, Pappas, and Coffey. The band performed at the Second Bell Festival in Knoxville on September 30, 2022. In March 2023, they were featured in an episode of the Youtube documentary series "WUTK:40 Years of the Rock." In January 2022, the band confirmed that they are working on new music and that November entered the studio with Raskulinecz. Despite posting photos on social media of multiple recording sessions throughout the Winter and Spring at Rock Falcon in Nashville with Raskulinecz, and of demo sessions in Knoxville involving Davis, Coffey and Fisher, on May 30, 2023 Davis posted on the Lees Of Memory Instagram profile that the planned album, tentatively titled "JINX," would instead be a solo album, and confirmed in a comment that there would be no new Superdrag album. However, in a March 2026 interview with Darren Paltrowitz, Davis confirmed that around 10 new songs had already been written for a forthcoming Superdrag album.

In late 2023, the band resumed posts on social media, changing their biography from "1993–2023" to "Est. 1993", but did not directly announce a resumption of activities until April 2024, when they announced their first Chicago show since 2009.

== Members ==
- John Davis – vocals, guitar (1992–2003, 2007–2010, 2021–2023, 2024–present)
- Don Coffey Jr. – drums (1992–2003, 2007–2010, 2021–2023, 2024–present)
- Brandon Fisher – guitar (1992–2000, 2007–2010, 2021–2023, 2024–present)
- Tom Pappas – bass (1992–1999, 2007–2010, 2021–2023, 2024–present)
- Sam Powers – bass (1999–2003)
- Mic Harrison – guitar (2001–2003)
- William "Willie T." Tyler – guitar (2000)
- Nick Slack - drums (2026)

== Discography ==
List of releases by Superdrag
Year	Title	Label
1995	Senorita EP b/w My Prayer, Cuts and Scars	Darla Records
1995	The Fabulous 8-Track Sound of Superdrag	Darla Records
1996	Regretfully Yours	Elektra Records
1998	Head Trip in Every Key	Elektra Records
1998	Stereo "360 Sound" + Seven Inches & Unreleased	Superdrag Sound Laboratories
1999	Señorita EP	Darla Records
2000	In the Valley of Dying Stars	Arena Rock Recording Co.
2000	The Rock Soldier CD	Arena Rock Recording Co.
2001	Greetings from Tennessee	Two Children Records / Arena Rock Recording Co.
2001	The Anniversary/Superdrag Split EP	Vagrant Records / Heroes & Villains
2002	Last Call For Vitriol	Arena Rock Recording Co.
2007	Changin' Tires on the Road to Ruin (rarities/B-sides compilation)	Arena Rock Recording Co.
2007	4-Track Rock!!! 1992–1995 + Complete "Bender" Sessions (two-disc demos compilation)	Superdrag Sound Laboratories
2009	Industry Giants	Superdrag Sound Laboratories / Thirty Tigers
2014	Jokers W/ Tracers (double-LP demos compilation)	SideOneDummy Records

== Tribute albums ==
- A Tribute to Superdrag (2006 – Double D Records)
