= Stereo "360 Sound" =

Studio album by Superdrag
- Released: November 1998
- Recorded: Various Locations
- Genre: Rock/Punk
- Length: 22:05 (original); 38:23 (reissue)
- Label: Superdrag Sound Laboratories
- Producer: Superdrag

Superdrag chronology
Head Trip in Every Key (1998)	Stereo "360 Sound" (1998)	Señorita EP (1999)

Professional ratings
Review scores
Source	Rating
Allmusic	link

Stereo "360 Sound" is the self-released debut album by Superdrag. It was originally released exclusively on cassette tape in April 1994 with just six tracks. It was re-released in 1998 on CD with four additional tracks from out-of-print 7-inch records and other unreleased songs. As such, they amended the album title to Stereo "360 Sound" + seven inches & unreleased for the 1998 release.

== Track listing ==
=== Original version ===
1. "Whitey's Theme" - 6:08
2. "My Prayer" - 2:29
3. "Señorita" - 3:22
4. "H.H.T." - 4:08
5. "Nothing Good is Real" - 3:48
6. "Cuts and Scars" - 2:10

=== CD reissue bonus tracks ===
7. "N.A. Kicker" - 3:00
8. "Diane" - 5:21
9. "Sleeping Beauty" - 3:27
10. "Take Your Spectre Away" - 4:30

== Personnel ==
- John Davis – vocals, guitars, piano
- Brandon Fisher – guitars
- Tom Pappas – bass
- Don Coffey, Jr. – drums

== Other mention of " Stereo 360 Sound" ==
The term "Stereo 360 Sound" was originally used in the labelling of "LP" records released by Columbia Records in the early thru mid 1960s...As mono and stereo LPs were released during this time, the "Stereo 360 Sound" logo was situated in a rectangular box with two arrows pointing in opposite directions which appeared on the top of the LP cover (only on stereo releases) adjacent to the "walking eye" logo. This practice ended roughly in 1968 when compatible stereo albums were released, thus mono LPs were phased out of production.

The "360 Sound" is also sometimes referred to as (or believed by some to be the name of) the recording technique where heavy reverberation, echo effects and "sound with sound" stereo separation was heard in albums released by Columbia during the 1950s and 60s under the supervision of Mitch Miller, thus giving the recordings a "larger than life" sound.

The recording technique was evident in such songs as:

- "Big Bad John" by Jimmy Dean
- "Theme from A Summer Place" by Percy Faith and His Orchestra
- "A White Sport Coat" by Marty Robbins
- "Today" by The New Christy Minstrels
- "Chances Are" by Johnny Mathis
- and practically all recordings made by Mitch Miller and His Orchestra and Chorus under the branding "Sing Along With Mitch." and by The Ray Conniff Singers and The Les and Larry Elgart Orchestra.
- The book "360 Sound The Story of Columbia Records" by Sean Wilentz takes its name from the Columbia Records branding.
