= Contraband (Velvet Revolver album) =

Studio album by Velvet Revolver
- Released: June 8, 2004
- Recorded: June–December 2003
- Studios: NRG and Pulse Recording
- Genre: Hard rock
- Length: 56:47
- Label: RCA
- Producers: Josh Abraham; Velvet Revolver; Nick Raskulinecz

Velvet Revolver chronology
Contraband (2004)	Libertad (2007)

Singles from Contraband
- 1. "Set Me Free" Released: June 17, 2003; 2. "Slither" Released: May 24, 2004; 3. "Fall to Pieces" Released: September 13, 2004; 4. "Dirty Little Thing" Released: September 20, 2004

Contraband is the debut studio album by American hard rock band Velvet Revolver. It was released on June 8, 2004, through RCA Records. A commercial success, Contraband debuted at number one on the American Billboard 200 chart and was certified double platinum by the RIAA.

== Background and recording ==
Velvet Revolver formed when then-former Guns N' Roses members Slash (guitar), Duff McKagan (bass), and Matt Sorum (drums) combined to play at a benefit concert for fellow musician Randy Castillo in 2002. They decided to form a band and recruited guitarist Dave Kushner who had most recently played in McKagan's band Loaded. The quartet then set about recruiting a lead singer with the recruitment process filmed by VH1. Several lead singers auditioned including Josh Todd of Buckcherry, Kelly Shaefer of Neurotica and Travis Meeks of Days of the New. Scott Weiland had become friends with McKagan and had played on the same bill as Kushner when Stone Temple Pilots were known as Mighty Joe Young and Kushner was in the Electric Love Hogs. Weiland heard the material and offered his services as the lead singer and the band clicked. Slash suggested the name Revolver for the project while Weiland suggested Black Velvet Revolver which was shortened to Velvet Revolver.

Velvet Revolver recorded its first track "Set Me Free" for the soundtrack of the film Hulk in 2003, later incorporated into the album's track listing, along with a cover of Pink Floyd's "Money" for The Italian Job, which was later released as a B-side.

The band played their first live gig at the El Rey in Los Angeles in July 2003. They recorded Contraband in the latter part of 2003 with recording complicated by Weiland's court appearances for drug charges and his subsequent sentencing to undertake rehabilitation. Slash recorded "Sucker Train Blues" with a Fender Telecaster 1956 and a Fender Stratocaster 1965.

== Release ==
The United States release of the disc uses the MediaMax CD-3 system for copy protection, while Macrovision CDS-200 is used for the European release. The album cover features a silhouette of American actress Rena Riffel.

In February 2005, RCA Records released a "Tour Edition" of the album in Europe, which included a bonus disc containing three tracks: B-sides "Surrender" (originally by Cheap Trick) and an acoustic "Fall to Pieces", along with the exclusive "No More, No More" (originally by Aerosmith).

Scott Borchetta named his record label Big Machine Records after the Contraband song of the same name.

== Critical reception ==
Professional ratings
Aggregate scores
Source	Rating
Metacritic	(65/100)
Review scores
Source	Rating
Allmusic	3/5 stars
Blabbermouth.net	6/10 stars
Blender	3/5 stars
Entertainment Weekly	B−
Mojo	4/5 stars
PopMatters	3/5 stars
Rolling Stone	4/5 stars
Stylus Magazine	D+
Ultimate Guitar Archive	(8.7/10)
Yahoo! Music	8/10 stars

Metacritic.com has given Contraband an average score of 65 based on 14 reviews, indicating that the critical response has been "generally favorable".

Mojo rated the album as "a perpetually guilty pleasure." Q magazine said it was "astonishingly good" rating it as four stars.

Rolling Stone rated it as four stars out of five and said, "it is a rare, fine thing: the sound of the perfect A&R sales pitch turning into a real band. Now we can find out if these guys can stay together, and go somewhere new."

ShakingThrough.net rated it as three and a half stars, although it said, "Contraband, the debut result of said pairing, never does transmute its elements into something new and exciting. Mostly, it sounds like no more and a little less than one might hope for from such a union."

Entertainment Weekly gave it a B−, saying, "[E]ven at its sharpest, Contraband feels secondhand, and much of it is also hobbled by a disconnect between singer and band."

Allmusic rated it as three stars out of five, saying, "With Contraband, Velvet Revolver has pulled off something tidy, fashioning music that manages both hedonism and maturity. It upholds legacies while grading a new route." Best tracks: "Big Machine", "Fall to Pieces" "Slither"

Blender said it was "A showcase for Weiland's vocals". Playlouder rated it as three candles out of five saying it sounded more like Stone Temple Pilots and "anyone who'd hoped for Guns N' Roses mark II (or III) will be very seriously disappointed." Best track "Fall to Pieces"

In 2005, Contraband was ranked number 317 in Rock Hard magazine's book The 500 Greatest Rock & Metal Albums of All Time.

== Commercial performance ==
Contraband debuted at No. 1 on the Billboard 200, selling 256,000 copies in its first week of release. Notably, this marked the best-ever debut for a new rock artist in the SoundScan era. The album would eventually sell over 2.9 million copies in the United States, and 4 million worldwide.

The first single, "Slither", topped a composite world modern rock chart in June, and later hit No. 1 on the Billboard Mainstream Rock Chart for 8 weeks. The follow-up, "Fall to Pieces", was a major crossover hit that reached No. 1 on the Billboard Mainstream Rock Chart for 11 weeks.

In 2005, Velvet Revolver won the Grammy Award for Best Hard Rock Performance, an award Weiland had previously won for the Stone Temple Pilots song "Plush" in 1994. At the ceremony, they were asked to play the music for a cover of the Beatles' "Across the Universe". The live recording was a hit on iTunes, with all proceeds going to charity. In January 2005, Velvet Revolver were also asked to play the music for a cover of Eric Clapton's "Tears in Heaven". The single was to aid victims of the 2004 Indian Ocean earthquake, with all proceeds going to Save the Children Foundation.

== Track listing ==
All lyrics are written by Scott Weiland, except where noted; all music is composed by Velvet Revolver, except where noted.

No.	Title	Writer(s)	Length
1.	"Sucker Train Blues"		4:27
2.	"Do It for the Kids"		3:55
3.	"Big Machine"		4:25
4.	"Illegal I Song"		4:17
5.	"Spectacle"		3:41
6.	"Fall to Pieces"		4:30
7.	"Headspace"		3:42
8.	"Superhuman"		4:15
9.	"Set Me Free"		4:07
10.	"You Got No Right"		5:35
11.	"Slither"		4:08
12.	"Dirty Little Thing"	Velvet Revolver, Keith Nelson	3:57
13.	"Loving the Alien"		5:48

United Kingdom edition
No.	Title	Writer(s)	Length
14.	"Bodies" (live Sex Pistols cover)	Johnny Rotten, Steve Jones, Sid Vicious, Paul Cook

Tour Edition bonus disc
No.	Title	Writer(s)	Length
1.	"Surrender" (Cheap Trick cover)	Rick Nielsen	4:25
2.	"No More No More" (Aerosmith cover)	Steven Tyler, Joe Perry	5:39
3.	"Fall to Pieces" (Acoustic Version)	Weiland	4:09
4.	"Slither" (music video)	Weiland, Slash, Duff McKagan, Matt Sorum, Dave Kushner	4:11
5.	"Fall to Pieces" (music video)	Weiland	4:34
6.	"Dirty Little Thing" (music video)	Slash, McKagan, Sorum, Nelson	3:58

Australian bonus disc
No.	Title	Writer(s)	Length
1.	"Surrender" (Cheap Trick cover)	Nielsen	4:25
2.	"No More No More" (Aerosmith cover)	Tyler, Perry	5:39
3.	"Negative Creep" (Nirvana cover)	Kurt Cobain	6:49
4.	"Slither" (music video)	Weiland, Slash, McKagan, Sorum, Kushner	4:11
5.	"Fall to Pieces" (music video)	Weiland	4:34

Note

- The version of "Set Me Free" on the album is different from the version on the Hulk soundtrack with different mixing and also contains a slightly different ending.

== Personnel ==
Adapted from the album's booklet.

Velvet Revolver

- Scott Weiland – lead and backing vocals, production
- Slash – lead guitar, additional backing vocals, production
- Duff McKagan – bass guitar, additional backing vocals, production
- Matt Sorum – drums, additional backing vocals, production
- Dave Kushner – rhythm guitar, production

Design

- Robin C. Hendrickson – art direction
- Brett Kilroe – art direction
- Dan Winters – photography

Production

- Josh Abraham – production
- Douglas Grean – keyboards on tracks 6, 10 and 13, vocal production, engineering, associate producer of "Set Me Free"
- Nick Raskulinecz – production on "Set Me Free"
- Andy Wallace – mixing
- Chris Young – mixing assistance
- Ryan Williams – engineering
- Brandon Belsky – engineering assistance
- Rocco Guarino – engineering assistance
- George Marino – mastering

== Charts ==
=== Weekly charts ===
Weekly chart performance for Contraband
Chart (2004–2005)	Peak position
Australian Albums (ARIA)	2
Austrian Albums (Ö3 Austria)	15
Belgian Albums (Ultratop Flanders)	24
Belgian Albums (Ultratop Wallonia)	89
Canada Top Albums/CDs (RPM)	1
Danish Albums (Hitlisten)	9
Dutch Albums (Album Top 100)	20
Finnish Albums (Suomen virallinen lista)	8
French Albums (SNEP)	34
German Albums (Offizielle Top 100)	7
Hungarian Albums (MAHASZ)	37
Irish Albums (IRMA)	8
Italian Albums (FIMI)	16
New Zealand Albums (RMNZ)	5
Norwegian Albums (VG-lista)	4
Portuguese Albums (AFP)	19
Scottish Albums (Official Charts)	6
Swedish Albums (Sverigetopplistan)	5
Swiss Albums (Schweizer Hitparade)	22
UK Albums (Official Charts)	11
US Billboard 200	1

=== Year-end charts ===
2004 year-end chart performance for Contraband
Chart (2004)	Position
Swedish Albums (Sverigetopplistan)	67
UK Albums (OCC)	141
US Billboard 200	49
Worldwide Albums (IFPI)	37

2005 year-end chart performance for Contraband
Chart (2005)	Position
US Billboard 200	111

== Certifications ==
Certifications for Contraband
Region	Certification	Certified units/sales
Australia (ARIA)	Gold	35,000^{^}
Canada (Music Canada)	2× Platinum	200,000^{^}
Japan (RIAJ)	Gold	100,000^{^}
New Zealand (RMNZ)	Platinum	15,000^{^}
United Kingdom (BPI)	Gold	100,000^{^}
United States (RIAA)	2× Platinum	2,000,000^{^}
^{^} Shipments figures based on certification alone.
