= Come On, Come In =

Single by Velvet Revolver

from the album Fantastic 4: The Album
- Released: June 21, 2005
- Recorded: May 5, 2005 at Osceola Recording Studios in Raleigh, North Carolina; May 16, 2005 at Lava Room Recordings, Lakewood, Ohio
- Genre: Hard rock
- Length: 3:50
- Label: Wind-Up
- Songwriter: Velvet Revolver
- Producers: Velvet Revolver; Douglas Grean; Nick Raskulinecz

Velvet Revolver singles chronology
"Dirty Little Thing" (2004)	"Come On, Come In" (2005)	"She Builds Quick Machines" (2007)

"Come On, Come In" is a song by American hard rock band Velvet Revolver," featured on the soundtrack to the 2005 superhero film Fantastic Four. When released as a promotional single in the United States on June 21, 2005, the song reached number 14 on the American Billboard Hot Mainstream Rock Tracks chart. The lyrics were written by vocalist Scott Weiland and the music was written by Weiland and the rest of the band; the song was produced by the band, Douglas Grean and Nick Raskulinecz. The music video for "Come On, Come In" was directed by Wayne Isham and is featured as an extra in the Fantastic Four DVD.

== Track listing ==
1. "Come On, Come In" - 3:50

== Personnel ==
Velvet Revolver

- Scott Weiland – vocals, production
- Slash – lead guitar, production
- Duff McKagan – bass, production
- Matt Sorum – drums, production
- Dave Kushner – rhythm guitar, production

Additional personnel

- Douglas Grean – production
- Nick Raskulinecz – production
- Mike Brown – vocals engineering
- Dave Donnelly – mastering
