= Hulk (soundtrack) =

Hulk (Original Motion Picture Soundtrack)

Film score by Danny Elfman
- Released: June 17, 2003
- Recorded: 2003
- Studios: Newman Scoring Stage, Twentieth Century Fox
- Genre: Film score
- Length: 63:41
- Labels: Decca; Universal; UMG
- Producer: Danny Elfman

Danny Elfman chronology
Chicago (2002)	Hulk (2003)	Big Fish (2003)

Singles from Hulk (Original Motion Picture Soundtrack)
- 1. "Set Me Free" Released: June 17, 2003

Hulk (Original Motion Picture Soundtrack) is the soundtrack accompanying the 2003 superhero film Hulk, directed by Ang Lee based on the Marvel Comics character of the same name, created by Stan Lee and Jack Kirby. The soundtrack featured musical score composed by Danny Elfman and the song "Set Me Free" by Velvet Revolver; the album was released through Decca Records on June 17, 2003.

== Development ==
The film's score was set to be composed by Mychael Danna, who previously associated with Lee on The Ice Storm (1997) and Ride with the Devil (1999). However, the executives at Universal Pictures rejected Danna's score due to its non-traditional approach; his score consisted of Japanese taiko, African drumming, and Arabic singing. Universal's president of film music, Kathy Nelson, later contacted composer Danny Elfman through telephonic conversation indicating his involvement in the film. Since Elfman was a fan of Lee's works and had also scored for the superhero films Batman (1989), Batman Returns (1992), and Spider-Man (2002), he agreed to it and eventually flew to Los Angeles, where he visited Lee at the Industrial Light & Magic studio, where the film was in post-production. With thirty-seven days to compose over two hours of music, Elfman agreed out of respect to Lee. While instructing to retain much of the character of Danna's score, Lee pushed Elfman to write material that did not sound like his previous superhero scores. Danna said, "They did leave some of my music in the movie, so the Arabic singing and some of the drumming is mine. What happened is that they panicked, they brought in Danny, and he heard what I've been doing, and I guess he liked it." Danna's initial score had an ethereal, world music element, which Elfman deciphered as "beautiful", but felt that it somehow did not suit the film's tone.

== Critical reception ==
Heather Phares of AllMusic rated two-and-a-half out of five, and summarized: "Presumably, the only people interested in this soundtrack will be either people who enjoyed the movie or die-hard Elfman fans; the former already know what to expect, while the latter might wonder if Elfman—or his music, anyway—hasn't undergone some strange transformation." In a more negative review, Filmtracks.com wrote "Elfman's work is an admirable failure, especially in context, though you can't fault him for the result of this nightmarish experience." However, Mark Hockley of Music Web International wrote "A potent, dynamic, fiercely moving work that reminds us, if we should need reminding, that Danny Elfman is unquestionably one of the great modern day film music composers."

== Accolades ==
At the 30th Saturn Awards, Elfman was nominated for Best Music but lost to Howard Shore for The Lord of the Rings: The Return of the King. However, Elfman won the Film Music Award for BMI Film & TV Awards.

== Track listing ==
Hulk (Original Motion Picture Soundtrack) track listing
No.	Title	Length
1.	"Main Titles"	4:36
2.	"Prologue"	4:38
3.	"Betty's Dream"	2:14
4.	"Bruce's Memories"	2:45
5.	"Captured"	3:41
6.	"Dad's Visit"	2:15
7.	"Hulk Out!"	4:00
8.	"Father Knows Best"	3:34
9.	"...Making Me Angry"	4:02
10.	"Gentle Giant"	1:02
11.	"Hounds of Hell"	3:47
12.	"The Truth Revealed"	4:19
13.	"Hulk's Freedom"	2:36
14.	"A Man Again"	7:48
15.	"The Lake Battle"	4:32
16.	"The Aftermath"	0:56
17.	"The Phone Call"	1:34
18.	"End Credits"	1:13
19.	"Set Me Free" (performed by Dave Kushner, Duff McKagan, Slash, Matt Sorum, and Scott Weiland)	4:09
Total length:		1:03:41

== Personnel ==
Credits adapted from liner notes.

- Music composer and producer – Danny Elfman
- Producer – Nick Raskulinecz (track 19)
- Programming – Buck Sanders, Clay Duncan, Don Harper, Ernie Lee, Judd Miller, Kenneth Burgomaster, Randy Kerber, Trevor Morris
- Engineer – Greg Dennen, Ryan Robinson
- Recording – Nick Wollage, Robert Fernandez
- Score recordist – John Rodd, Noah Snyder
- Mixing – Dennis Sands, Ben Grosse (track 19)
- Mastering – Patricia Sullivan Fourstar
- Supervising music editor – Ellen Segal
- Additional music editor – Shie Rozow
- Assistant music editor – Oliver Hug
- Scoring crew – Bill Talbott, Damon Tedesco, Tom Steel
- Music co-ordinator – Meredith Friedman

Orchestra

- Orchestrators – Bruce Fowler, David Slonaker, Edgardo Simone, Jeff Atmajian, Mark McKenzie, Pete Anthony, Robert Elhai, Steve Bartek
- Supervising orchestrator – Steve Bartek
- Conductor – Pete Anthony
- Contractor – Debbi Datz-Pyle, The Music Team
- Music preparation – Julian Bratolyubov, Sean Hickey
- Additional music preparation – Ron Vermillion

Instruments

- Bass – Christian Kollgaard, Norman Ludwin
- Drums – Mike Fisher
- Flute – Jim Walker, Louise Di Tullio
- French horn – Brad Warnaar, Brian O'Connor, Daniel P. Kelley, James Thatcher, Jerry Folsom, Joe Meyer, John A. Reynolds, Kurt Snyder, Nathan Campbell, Paul Klintworth, Phil Yao, Richard Todd, Steve Becknell, Steven Durnin, Todd Miller, Yvonne S. Moriarty
- Oboe – Tom Boyd
- Percussion – Brian Kilgore
- Trombone – Alan Kaplan, Alex Iles, Bill Reichenbach, Bob Sanders, Charles Loper, Dick Nash, Phil Teele, Steven Holtman
- Trumpet – Jon Lewis, Malcolm McNab, Marissa Benedict, Rick Baptist, Tim Morrison, Warren Luening
- Tuba – Tommy Johnson, John Van Houten
- Viola – Maria Newman
- Violin – Eun-Mee Ahn, Jagan Ramamoorthy
- Vocals – Natacha Atlas
