= Regretfully Yours =

Studio album by Superdrag
- Released: March 26, 1996
- Studio: Easley-McCain (Memphis, Tennessee); Fort Apache Studios (Cambridge, Massachusetts)
- Genre: Alternative rock Power pop Indie rock
- Length: 41:30
- Label: Elektra
- Producer: Tim O'Heir

Superdrag chronology
| The Fabulous 8-Track Sound of Superdrag (1995) | Regretfully Yours (1996) | Head Trip in Every Key (1998) |

Professional ratings
Review scores
| Source | Rating |
|---|---|
| AllMusic | 4/5 stars |
| The Encyclopedia of Popular Music | 4/5 stars |

Regretfully Yours is the debut album by Superdrag, released on Elektra Records in 1996. The first single, "Sucked Out", expressed disdain for the music industry. It was an MTV Buzz Bin hit. "Sucked Out" reached #17 on Billboard's Modern Rock chart.

A vinyl version — which didn't appear at the time of the original release despite the album's retro aesthetic — was released in 2012 on SideOneDummy Records.

The album peaked at No. 158 on the Billboard 200.

== Critical reception ==
The Encyclopedia of Popular Music wrote that the album "suffered from a cleaner production than their independent debut, losing some of the band's rough power pop charm in the process." Trouser Press wrote: "That [John] Davis’ vulnerably sweet and sour songwriting is in full effect is the album's saving grace, but the audible sense of what Superdrag is about has changed a lot."

== Track listing ==
All songs written by John Davis.

1. "Slot Machine" - 2:36
2. "Phaser" - 3:19
3. "Carried" - 2:15
4. "Sucked Out" - 2:46
5. "Cynicality" - 3:20
6. "Destination Ursa Major" - 3:55
7. "Whitey's Theme" - 4:42
8. "Truest Love" - 2:41
9. "What If You Don't Fly" - 2:14
10. "Garmonbozia" - 3:38
11. "N.A. Kicker" - 2:37
12. "Nothing Good Is Real" - 4:43
13. "Rocket" - 2:46

== Personnel ==
- John Davis: vocals, guitars, piano, organ, mellotron
- Brandon Fisher: guitars
- Tom Pappas: bass
- Don Coffey, Jr.: drums
