= In the Valley of Dying Stars =

Studio album by Superdrag
- Released: October 17, 2000 (US); April, 2001 (Japan)
- Studio: Woodland (Nashville, Tennessee); Stealth Studios (Knoxville, Tennessee)
- Genre: Rock
- Length: 46:21
- Label: Arena Rock
- Producer: Nick Raskulinecz and Superdrag

Superdrag chronology
Señorita EP (1999)	In the Valley of Dying Stars (2000)	The Rock Soldier CD (2000)

Professional ratings
Review scores
Source	Rating
AllMusic	3/5 stars
The Encyclopedia of Popular Music	3/5 stars
Pitchfork	5.3/10

In the Valley of Dying Stars is the third album by Superdrag, released by Arena Rock Recording Co. in 2000. The Japanese version includes two bonus tracks, "Comfortably Bummed" and "Diane".

== Production ==
The album was produced by Nick Raskulinecz and the band. It was recorded at Stealth Studios and Woodland Studios, in Tennessee. Sam Powers plays bass on the album, replacing Tom Pappas.

== Critical reception ==
The Riverfront Times wrote that Superdrag's songs "have some lyrical bite but musically are as sweet as (non-boy-band) popular music gets these days." The Washington Post wrote: "This is Superdrag's best album, exuberant pop-rock tempered with a rueful worldview." CMJ New Music Monthly thought that the band drives the songs "into overdrive, framing ironic shots (largely at the band's former label) in complex, almost Queen-like arrangements." The Boston Globe deemed the album "rich, resonant power pop." The Tallahassee Democrat called it "a gorgeous example of the new pop sensibility, tough and tight and brimming with brilliant hooks."

== Track listing ==
All songs written by John Davis.

1. "Keep It Close to Me" - 3:50
2. "Gimme Animosity" - 3:23
3. "Baby's Waiting" - 3:08
4. "Goin' Out" - 3:51
5. "Lighting the Way" - 3:27
6. "The Warmth of a Tomb" - 5:54
7. "Bright Pavilions" - 4:56
8. "Ambulance Driver" - 4:00
9. "Unprepared" - 3:32
10. "Some Kind of Tragedy" - 3:16
11. "True Believer" - 3:08
12. "In the Valley of Dying Stars" - 3:56

=== Japan bonus tracks ===
13. "Comfortably Bummed"
14. "Diane"

== Personnel ==
- John Davis – vocals, guitars, piano, organ, bass (except on tracks 1, 4, 11, and 12)
- Brandon Fisher – guitars
- Sam Powers – bass (on tracks 1, 4, 11, and 12), vocals
- Don Coffey Jr. – drums
