= Dirty Little Thing =

Single by Velvet Revolver

from the album Contraband
- Released: September 20, 2004
- Recorded: August–December 2003 in Los Angeles, California
- Genre: Hard rock
- Length: 3:57
- Label: RCA Records
- Songwriters: Velvet Revolver; Keith Nelson
- Producer: Josh Abraham

Velvet Revolver singles chronology
"Fall to Pieces" (2004)	"Dirty Little Thing" (2004)	"Come On, Come In" (2004)

"Dirty Little Thing" is a hard rock song by the supergroup Velvet Revolver, released as the fourth and final single off the band's debut album Contraband. The song was a top-ten hit on rock radio, although it did not repeat the number one success achieved by their previous two singles, "Slither" and "Fall to Pieces".

== History ==
Before Scott Weiland and Dave Kushner joined the band, the band was slated to include Josh Todd and Keith Nelson from the band Buckcherry. "Dirty Little Thing" was written during the time with them. Suddenly, Slash decided to boot the two from the band, but Nelson was given songwriting credit.

== Track listing ==
1. "Dirty Little Thing" - 3:57

== Song composition ==
The song's lyrics center around a girl who lives a crazy life involving sex, drugs and alcohol. The song opens with bass riffs from Duff McKagan and then the guitar enters, playing major chords. The song has a string chorus and a guitar solo by Slash. The song's structure and sound is very similar to the opening track on Contraband, "Sucker Train Blues".

== Music video ==
The band is playing in the inside of a train, where there are a lot of women and gambling. The inside of the train is live action film, whereas the outside is animated. This train goes through various places such as San Francisco, Las Vegas, and finishing in Los Angeles, by the end of the video, the train car starts losing its fuselage, causing the band to turn animated. The camera then zooms out to reveal the train on a woman's hip. At the end of the video, the woman takes her position to match the cover on Contraband. The video was originally intended to be for Contraband's first track "Sucker Train Blues"; however, the idea was turned down on label's imposition, which opted to release "Dirty Little Thing" in its place.

== Charts ==
=== Weekly charts ===
Weekly chart performance for "Dirty Little Thing"
Charts (2004–2005)	Peak position
Canada Rock Top 30 (Radio & Records)	9
US Alternative Airplay (Billboard)	18
US Mainstream Rock (Billboard)	8

=== Year-end charts ===
Year-end chart performance for "Dirty Little Thing"
Chart (2005)	Position
US Mainstream Rock Tracks (Billboard)	31
US Modern Rock Tracks (Billboard)	78
