= Industry Giants =

Studio album by Superdrag
- Released: March 17, 2009
- Recorded: 2008
- Genre: Punk rock, power pop, shoegaze, indie rock
- Length: 45:49
- Label: Superdrag Sound Laboratories / Thirty Tigers
- Producer: John Davis

Superdrag chronology
Changin' Tires On The Road To Ruin (2007)	Industry Giants (2009)

Professional ratings
Review scores
Source	Rating
Allmusic	link

Industry Giants is the fifth and final album by alternative rock band Superdrag. It was released in 2009 on Superdrag Sound Laboratories. The album was the band's first album since their 2003 hiatus and reformation with the original lineup in 2007. It also marked the first writing credits and lead vocals on a Superdrag LP by guitarist Brandon Fisher ("Ready to Go") and bassist Tom Pappas ("Cheap Poltergeists," "You're Alive," "4 On The Floor").

== Track listing ==
All songs written by John Davis, except where noted.

1. "Slow to Anger" - 3:02
2. "Live and Breathe" - 4:34
3. "I Only Want a Place I Can Stay" - 4:19
4. "Everything'll Be Made Right" - 4:49
5. "Cheap Poltergeists" (Tom Pappas) - 3:40
6. "Try" - 5:14
7. "Ready to Go" (Brandon Fisher) - 3:34
8. "Filthy and Afraid" - 3:36
9. "You're Alive" (Pappas) - 2:49
10. "5 Minutes Ahead of the Chaos" - 2:04
11. "Aspartame" - 3:46
12. "Deathblow to Your Pride" - 4:22
13. "4 On The Floor" (Pappas) - 3:43 (Amazon.com bonus track)
14. "Filter Out the Air" - 3:59 (iTunes bonus track)

== Cover art ==
The ant on the back cover is lifting Indianapolis's Salesforce Tower. Salesforce Tower (formerly Bank One Tower and Chase Tower) is the tallest building in Indiana.
