= Changin' Tires on the Road to Ruin =

Changin' Tires On The Road To Ruin

Compilation album by Superdrag
- Released: 2007
- Genre: Rock/Punk
- Length: 48:42
- Label: Arena Rock

Superdrag chronology
Last Call For Vitriol (2002)	Changin' Tires On The Road To Ruin (2007)	Industry Giants (2009)

Professional ratings
Review scores
Source	Rating
AllMusic	3.5/5 stars
eMusic	4/5 stars

Changin' Tires on the Road to Ruin is a 14-song B-sides/rarities compilation album from Superdrag released by Arena Rock Recording Co. in 2007.

== Track listing ==
All tracks by John Davis

1. "Here We Come" - 2:15*
  - (8-Track Demo, Bearsville, NY, February 1997)
2. "She Says" - 3:42†
  - (8-Track Demo, Bearsville, NY, February 1997)
3. "My Day (Will Come)" - 1:53†
  - (8-Track Demo, Bearsville, NY, February 1997)
4. "Sleeping Beauty" - 3:22*
  - (8-Track Demo, Bearsville, NY, November 1997)
5. "Doctors Are Dead" - 5:34*
  - (8-Track Demo, Stealth Studio, October 1998)
6. "Comfortably Bummed" - 3:57*
  - (8-Track Demo, Stealth Studio, October 1998)
7. "No Inspiration" - 3:08*
  - (8-Track Demo, Stealth Studio, October 1998)
8. "Keep It Close To Me" - 3:49*
  - (4-Track Demo, Stealth Studio, 1999)
9. "Extra-Sensory" - 3:14*
  - (4-Track Demo, Stealth Studio, 1999)
10. "I Am Incinerator" - 3:02† (previously titled "I Guess It's American")
  - (8-track Demo, Stealth Studio, 1999)
11. "Relocate My Satellites" - 4:14*
  - (4-Track Demo, Stealth Studio, 1999)
12. "The Rest Of The World" - 3:46*
  - (4-Track Demo, October 2001)
13. "Lighting The Way (Live)" - 3:24
  - (Live At The Exit/In, Nashville, TN, 6-21-03)
14. "True Believer (Live)" - 3:22
  - (Live At The Exit/In, Nashville, TN, 6-21-03)

* = previously unreleased
† = from the out-of-print Rock Soldier CD promo

== Personnel ==
- Don Coffey Jr. – Drums, Mixing, Group Member
- John Davis – Organ, Guitar, Piano, Pedal Steel, Bass (Electric), Drums, Piano (Electric), Vocals, Engineer, Liner Notes, Mixing, Group Member
- Jim DeMain – Mastering
- Robbie Dubov – Assistant Engineer
- Brandon Fisher – Guitar, Group Member
- Mike Harrison – Guitar, Vocals, Group Member
- Brian Jacobus – Engineer, Mixing
- Stewart Pack – Photography, Package Design
- Tom Pappas – Bass (Electric), Group Member
- Sam Powers – Bass (Electric), Vocals, Group Member
- Nick Raskulinecz – Engineer, Mixing
- Jamie Shoemaker – Engineer
