= Black Smoke Trigger =

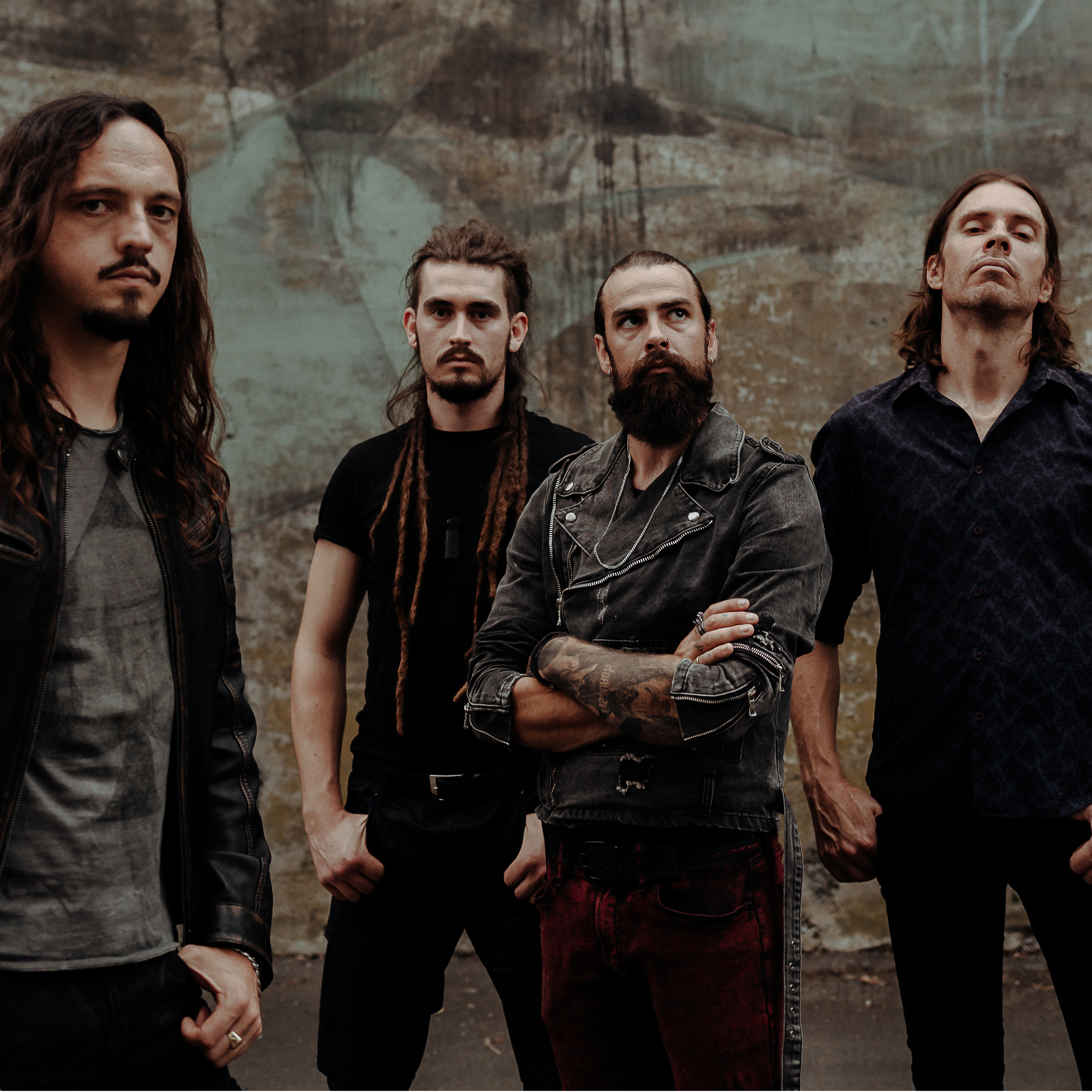
- Black Smoke Trigger in 2020

Background information
- Origin: Napier, New Zealand
- Genres: Hard rock, alternative rock
- Years active: 2018-present
- Members: Baldrick; Charlie Wallace; Dan Fulton; Josh Te Maro
- Website: blacksmoketrigger.com

Black Smoke Trigger is a hard rock/alternative rock band from Napier, New Zealand, founded in 2018. They released their first EP Set It Off in 2019. The band takes influences from acts such as Audioslave, Alice in Chains and Guns N' Roses.

== History ==
The Black Smoke Trigger band members all grew up in homes full of music in the tourist city of Napier in New Zealand. As a child, Rasmussen listened to AC/DC, Elton John, Neil Diamond and Guns N' Roses. Starting guitar at the age of 12, he soon branched into writing his own songs – learning drums and bass along the way – and went on to join various local bands. He met guitarist Wallace when the two were about 13.

The band recorded the EP Set It Off in Nashville, USA with Michael Wagener. It debuted on the Billboard charts at #13 Heatseekers Albums, #46 Rock Album Sales, #6 Heatseekers - South Atlantic, and #43 Independent Album Sales, in the first week of release. Black Smoke Trigger returned home to a nationwide tour supporting Devilskin.

In 2021 Black Smoke Trigger signed with US artist manager Andy Gould.

April 2022 the band entered the Rock Falcon Studio in Nashville with producer Nick Raskulinecz, to record their first full-length album. This time around the band has collaborated with Disturbed’s David Draiman, Marti Frederickson (Aerosmith, Ozzy Osbourne), Blair Daly and Zac Maloy (Shinedown, Lynyrd Skynyrd, Keith Urban), and Keith Wallen (of Breaking Benjamin). “Our first EP was really an homage to our influences,” said Wallace. “Since then we’ve had a lot of time to sit together in a room to write and play, and our new material is representative of who we are as a band in 2023.”

In 2024 they opened for Halestorm at the Auckland Town Hall and toured with Filter across Australia. They also opened for Bruce Dickinson on his solo tour in the UK, and at one-offs in the Netherlands and France.

The band's debut album Horizons was released August 2, 2024.

== Members ==
- Baldrick – vocals
- Charlie Wallace – guitar
- Dan Fulton – bass
- Josh Te Maro – drums

== Discography ==
=== Extended Plays ===
- 2019: Set It Off
- 2024: Horizons

=== Singles ===
- 2019 - "Caught In The Undertow"
- 2019 - "You Can Have It All"
- 2023 - "The Way Down"
- 2024 - "Perfect Torture"
- 2024 - "Proof Of Life"
- 2024 - "K.M.T.L"
- 2024 - "Learn To Crawl"
- 2024 - "Sun Cries Red"

=== Music Videos ===
Year	Title	Director
2019	"Caught In The Undertow"	Anthony Plant
2019	"Blindfolds & Rattlesnakes"	Ben Firman
2020	"You Can Have It All"	Anthony Plant
2023	"The Way Down"	Anthony Plant
2024	"Perfect Torture"	Anthony Plant
2024	"Proof Of Life"	Anthony Plant
2024	"K.M.T.L"	Anthony Plant
2024	"Learn To Crawl"	Anthony Plant
