= Negative Creep =

Song by Nirvana

from the album Bleach
- Released: June 15, 1989
- Recorded: December 29–31, 1988
- Studio: Reciprocal Recording (Seattle, Washington)
- Genre: Grunge; punk rock; heavy metal
- Length: 2:56
- Label: Sub Pop
- Songwriter: Kurt Cobain
- Producer: Jack Endino

"Negative Creep" is a song by the American rock band Nirvana, written by vocalist and guitarist, Kurt Cobain. It is the seventh song on their debut album Bleach, released in June 1989.

== Background and composition ==
"Negative Creep" was written by Cobain in 1988. To date, no demo version of the song has appeared on official releases or bootlegs.

"Negative Creep" was one of nine songs recorded during Nirvana's third studio session, in December 1988 and January 1989 at Reciprocal Recording in Seattle, Washington, that were released on their July 1989 debut album, Bleach. According to producer Jack Endino, the band, featuring then-drummer Chad Channing along with Cobain and bassist Krist Novoselic, recorded as quickly as possible, with the intention of recording a full album rather than an EP as requested by their then-label, Sub Pop. In a 2004 interview with Rob Nash of The Independent, Endino recalled that the band would record the instruments "in one or two takes", and Cobain would then record the vocals in usually a single take.

"Negative Creep"
"Negative Creep" is exemplary of Seattle's grunge sound. It features Cobain's frantic wails and screaming on top of a repetitious and heavy grunge riff.

"Negative Creep" has been described as one of the "Sub Popiest" songs the band ever recorded, and "a text book example of Seattle's true grunge sound". The studio version is the only Nirvana recording that employs an extended fade-out while the vocals are still present.

Several critics have noted the intensity of Cobain's vocals on the studio recording, with Mark Richardson of Pitchfork writing:

"Cobain's voice through the second verse terrifies me. There is no concern for his physical well being or even his future as a vocalist in a rock band. He sings as intensely as he can possibly sing. Sometimes, when I'm listening loud, I think my headphones might be breaking up from the volume only to realize that the membrane being excited to the point of distortion is actually Cobain's larynx."

In his 1993 Nirvana biography Come As You Are: The Story of Nirvana, Michael Azerrad described "Negative Creep" as "a first-person narrative from an antisocial person," with that person being Cobain himself. James Jackson Toth of Stereogum called it a "chilling ode to social awkwardness" during which "Cobain, sounding like a cross between Lemmy and a gargoyle, acknowledges his position as a shadowy outsider–even revels in it."

Steve Fisk, who produced Nirvana's Blew EP in 1989, offered an alternate theory of the song's meaning, saying that "I got told it was about the guy who lived across the street from the duplex and would come over while Kurt was gone to try to smoke [Cobain's then-girlfriend] Tracy [Marander] out."

The song received some criticism from members of the Seattle music scene in the late 1980s because of the lyric, "Daddy's little girl ain't a girl no more," which closely resembled the lyrics to "Sweet Young Thing Ain't Sweet No More" by Nirvana's Sub Pop label mates Mudhoney. According to Azerrad, Cobain claimed the similarity was an example of "subconscious theft."

== Live performances ==
"Negative Creep" was debuted live on February 25, 1989, at the Husky Union Building at the University of Washington in Seattle, Washington. The song remained a set list regular for the next four years, until its final live performance on April 9, 1993, at the Cow Palace in San Francisco, California. It was jammed on briefly during Nirvana's MTV Unplugged appearance in November 1993, after being requested by an audience member, but both Cobain and Novoselic said that they no longer knew how to play it.

== Reception ==
In a July 1989 review of Bleach, Edwin Pouncey of the NME called the song "glorious" and wrote that it was "a leash strainer of a song that eventually gets loose and goes on the rampage like a rabid Rottweiler. Fab!"

=== Accolades ===
Year	Publication	Country	Accolade	Rank
1998	Kerrang!	United Kingdom	20 Great Nirvana Songs Picked by the Stars	9
2023	The A.V. Club	United States	Essential Nirvana: Their 30 greatest songs, ranked	25

== Legacy ==
In 2015, Rolling Stone placed "Negative Creep" at number 15 on their ranking of 102 Nirvana songs. In 2022, Revolver named it one of the "10 Heaviest Grunge Songs of All Time," with Eli Enis writing that "for every glimpse at future pop-rock supremacy on Bleach, there's another song like this, a motorik, almost thrashy ripper that sees Kurt Cobain spitting back his own ugly self-perception — 'I'm a negative creep and I'm stoned' — with the wiry wrath of the picked-on kid finally taking a swing at his bully." In 2023, PopMatters included it on their list of "The 10 Heaviest Nirvana Songs," with Dean Brown calling it "one of the most violent songs in Nirvana’s back catalogue" and "metal to the bone." The same year, the A.V. Club ranked it at number 25 on their list of Nirvana's "30 greatest songs".

"Negative Creep" appeared in the 1996 grunge documentary, Hype!, and was included in the film's soundtrack. It also appeared in the bonus CD included with the 1995 book Screaming Life: A Chronicle of the Seattle Music Scene, which collected the photographs of acclaimed music photographer, Charles Peterson.

== Other releases ==
- A live version, recorded at the Pine Street Theatre in Portland, Oregon on February 9, 1990, was released on the 20th anniversary "Deluxe" version of Bleach, which featured the full Pine Street show as bonus material.
- A live version, recorded at Sir Henry's in Cork, Ireland on August 20, 1991, appeared on the live video, 1991: The Year Punk Broke, released in 1992. This version featured Cobain singing the first verse of the song in falsetto.
- A live version, recorded during the band's performance at the Paramount Theatre in Seattle, Washington on October 31, 1991, appeared on the live compilation, From the Muddy Banks of the Wishkah, released in November 1996. The full show was released on DVD and Blu-Ray as Live at the Paramount in September 2011.
- A live version, recorded at the Paradiso in Amsterdam, the Netherlands on November 25, 1991, was released on the 30th anniversary "Super Deluxe" version of Nevermind, which featured the full show on CD and Blu-Ray.
- Two additional live versions, from the band's shows at The Palace in Melbourne, Australia on February 2, 1992, and at the Nakano Sunplaza in Tokyo, Japan on February 19, 1992, also appeared on the 30th anniversary "Super Deluxe" version of Nevermind.
- A live version, recorded on February 22, 1992, at Pink's Garage in Honolulu, Hawaii, appeared on the live video Live! Tonight! Sold Out!!, released in November 1994.
- A live version, from the band's performance at the 1992 Reading Festival in Reading, England on August 30, 1992, appeared on Live at Reading, released in November 2009 on CD and DVD.

== Covers ==
Year	Artist	Album
1996	Tura Satana	Relief Through Release
1997	Machine Head	Take My Scars
2001	Dee Dee Ramone	Smells Like Bleach: A Punk Tribute to Nirvana
2004	Velvet Revolver	Slither
