= Sucked Out =

Single by Superdrag

from the album Regretfully Yours
- Released: April 1996
- Genre: Alternative rock, power pop
- Length: 2:46
- Label: Elektra
- Songwriter(s): John Davis
- Producer(s): Tim O'Heir

Superdrag singles chronology
"Sucked Out" (1996)	"Destination Ursa Major" (1996)

"Sucked Out" is a song by Superdrag and the first single from their debut album, Regretfully Yours. It peaked at #17 on the Billboard Modern Rock Tracks chart.

== Reception ==
Pitchfork described the song as "Tight and tuneful, with a hook that still sounds fresh even after the band has bashed through it at least a dozen times within three minutes, "Sucked Out" provided a rare dose of honest-to-god melody amid the yarling post-grunge that was starting to clog up the alternative airwaves in the mid '90s."
