= She Builds Quick Machines =

Single by Velvet Revolver

from the album Libertad
- Released: May 21, 2007
- Recorded: December 11, 2006 – February 22, 2007
- Genre: Hard rock
- Length: 4:02
- Label: RCA
- Songwriters: Scott Weiland; Slash; Duff McKagan; Matt Sorum; Dave Kushner
- Producer: Brendan O'Brien

Velvet Revolver singles chronology
"Come On, Come In" (2005)	"She Builds Quick Machines" (2007)	"The Last Fight" (2007)

Audio sample
- file; help

"She Builds Quick Machines" is a rock song by Velvet Revolver, and was released as the first single from the album Libertad on May 21, 2007. The song was made available for digital download on May 16, 2007. Besides being featured on Libertad, "She Builds Quick Machines" was also featured on the EP Melody and the Tyranny. The music video premiered on Fuse TV's The Sauce on May 23. The song was also featured in the video game NASCAR 08.

== Music video ==
Directed by Dean Karr, the band is a group of modern cowboys standing on what appears to be a desert in the Texas/Mexico Border region. Something is seen falling from the sky and Scott Weiland (suited as The Man with No Name in the film A Fistful of Dollars) holds up a telescope, in which they see a female angel called "Libertad" (Spanish for 'freedom') played by Fernanda Romero. After crashing to Earth, she is kidnapped by the people of a Mexican village, who seem hostile. Various members of the band lip sync the lyrics of the song as if they were the dialogue of the "film". The band tries to track her down on various vehicles equipped with radios, distributed in the following way: Weiland and Duff McKagan in a car, Matt Sorum on a motorcycle and Slash with Dave Kushner in a van. They arrive at the village and have a big fight that involves explosions, molotov cocktails and gun shooting. After the fight is over, the band finds Libertad and releases her.

== Chart positions ==
Chart (2007)	Peak Position
Canada Hot 100 (Billboard)	43
US Alternative Airplay (Billboard)	14
US Bubbling Under Hot 100 (Billboard)	4
US Mainstream Rock (Billboard)	2
