= Velocity of Sound Records =

Velocity of Sound
- Founded: 1999
- Founder: Darren Little, Todd Stoll
- Country of origin: Pittsburgh Pennsylvania United States
- Official website: www.velocityofsound.com

Velocity of Sound is a record label formed in Pittsburgh, Pennsylvania, USA in 1999 by Darren Little and Todd Stoll. Concentrating on releasing 7" singles, Velocity of Sound released the world's first hair filled vinyl record in 2014 for Eohippus "Getting Your Hair Wet With Pee".

== Roster ==
- The Ceiling Stares
- Eohippus
- Epic Ditch
- Fresh Vehicle
- Hurts To Laugh
- The Lees of Memory
- Lonely Planet Boy
- PUJOL
- Shaky Shrines
- Shockwave Riderz
- The Super Vacations
- Wild Vagina
