= Set Me Free (Velvet Revolver song) =

Single by Velvet Revolver

from the album Hulk (Original Motion Picture Soundtrack) and Contraband
- Released: June 17, 2003
- Recorded: August–December 2002; Los Angeles, California
- Genre: Hard rock
- Length: 4:09 (soundtrack version); 4:08 (album version)
- Label: Decca; Universal; UMG
- Songwriters: Scott Weiland; Slash; Duff McKagan; Matt Sorum; Dave Kushner
- Producer: Nick Raskulinecz

Velvet Revolver singles chronology
"Set Me Free" (2003)	"Slither" (2004)

"Set Me Free" is the debut single by Velvet Revolver, released in 2003 as the lead single from the soundtrack to the 2003 Marvel Comics film Hulk, and later the band's debut album Contraband.

== Alternative versions ==
The album version features different mixing and also contains a slightly different ending, with the drum beat no longer finishing the song.

A live version is also included on the "Slither" single. This version includes an extended guitar solo at the end of the song.

== Song structure ==
The song's main riff was created by the band's guitarist, Slash. The song then goes through two rotations of verse-chorus, then a bridge and a fairly complicated guitar solo by Slash. The song then finishes with another chorus and guitar solo.

== Music video ==
The music video, directed by Dean Karr, shows the band playing at a club live, which was the first gig where the Velvet Revolver idea was formed. It also shows some scenes from the Hulk movie.

== Track listing ==
No.	Title	Length
1.	"Set Me Free"	4:08

== Chart performance ==
Chart (2003)	Peak Position
US Alternative Airplay (Billboard)	32
US Mainstream Rock (Billboard)	17
