= Libertad (Velvet Revolver album) =

Studio album by Velvet Revolver
- Released: July 3, 2007
- Recorded: December 11, 2006 – February 25, 2007
- Studios: Henson (Hollywood, California)
- Genre: Hard rock
- Length: 51:48
- Label: RCA
- Producers: Brendan O'Brien; Velvet Revolver

Velvet Revolver chronology
Contraband (2004)	Libertad (2007)

Singles from Libertad
- 1. "She Builds Quick Machines" Released: May 21, 2007; 2. "The Last Fight" Released: August 20, 2007; 3. "Get Out the Door" Released: January 29, 2008

Libertad is the second and final studio album by American hard rock band Velvet Revolver. It was released on July 3, 2007, through RCA Records. The album's name is Spanish and translates to "liberty" or "freedom" in English. According to an interview with Rolling Stone, along with the Stone Temple Pilots albums Core and the self-titled 2010 album, Libertad is one of only three albums lead singer Scott Weiland wrote while sober.

== Release and promotion ==
Velvet Revolver originally announced their plans for a second album in late 2005, when Weiland said that the band was planning on recording a concept album. Although it is not certain how concrete the concept album plans were, they were eventually scrapped and the band began to work with producer Rick Rubin. However, the bandmembers felt that Rubin was not a good fit for the band and thus parted ways with him. In December 2006, Velvet Revolver began working with producer Brendan O'Brien, who had previously produced albums for Stone Temple Pilots, Weiland's former band. As Weiland commented in Kerrang! magazine, "We were really excited about six months ago, when we first began writing. Then we really kind of flat-lined for a while, We didn't know which way we were going. Once Brendan (O'Brien) came on board, it was kind of like a shot in the arm. It was a new energy." Recording began on December 11 and continued through December, January, and February. The process was documented by a series of vlogs available on the band's website.

On June 26, 2007, Velvet Revolver released a sneak peek of Libertad in its entirety.

Libertad was a released as an Enhanced-CD which includes a 10-minute video documentary called "Re-Evolution: The Making of Libertad" (Directed by Rocco Guarino). A deluxe Best Buy edition was also released which includes a DVD containing a 30-minute documentary called "Tierra Roja, Sangre Roja" (Directed by Rocco Guarino), that documented the band's journey across South America.

To promote the album, Velvet Revolver embarked on a South American tour with Aerosmith. The final performance saw 70,000 fans in attendance. Shortly thereafter, VR embarked on a North American club tour, revealing several new songs. The band also played major music festivals such as the Download Festival. In August 2007, they began a North American arena tour with Alice in Chains, and later toured Europe and Asia.

Songs from the album were featured at X Games XIII as being the official background music to the event. The track "Let It Roll" is also used as the official theme song for the 2007 WWE Diva Search. The song "American Man" has also been used in promotional ads for the popular drama Prison Break.

== Reception ==
Professional ratings
Aggregate scores
Source	Rating
Metacritic	(68/100)
Review scores
Source	Rating
Allmusic	3.5/5 stars
Billboard	(Positive)
Blabbermouth	6/10 stars
Entertainment Weekly	A−
New York Post	4/4 stars
Rolling Stone	3.5/5 stars
The Austin Chronicle	2/5 stars
San Francisco Chronicle	(Positive)
USA Today	3/4 stars
Yahoo!	(Positive)

The album debuted at number five on the U.S. Billboard 200, selling 92,000 copies in its first week; as of October 12, 2007, it had sold 222,000 copies and had fallen off the charts. Compared to the multi-platinum success of Contraband, Libertad was seen as a commercial disappointment for the band. The album is certified Silver in the United Kingdom and Gold in New Zealand and Canada. Upon its release, Libertad received generally positive reviews and was said to possibly be "THE rock record of the summer" according to the Associated Press. Rolling Stone also gave the album a good review, stating that "there is plenty of thrill in the fuzz-lined hard-rubber bends of Slash's guitar breaks and the way bassist Duff McKagan keeps time, like a cop swinging a billy club" and that the album had "honest depth."

== Title and cover art ==
=== Pinochet's regime allusion ===
The album's cover features a stylized 10 Chilean pesos coin produced from 1973 to 1990. The coin is an allusion to the coup d'état in Chile in 1973 against the socialist president Salvador Allende. During the Augusto Pinochet military dictatorship, the coin bore the image of the winged female figure. To her side, in small Roman numerals, the date of the coup d'état is marked (September 11, 1973), and underneath the word Libertad ("Freedom", meant as "freedom" from Marxism) is written in capitals. After the restoration of democracy, Pinochet's winged female was replaced with the portrait of the Chilean independence hero Bernardo O'Higgins.

It was later stated by Slash, in an interview in September 2007 by radio station 102.1 The Edge in Dallas, the image came from a friend's old Chilean 10 pesos necklace. Slash reported that he had no idea what the significance of the image was until a concert in Brazil.

== Track listing ==
All music is composed by Velvet Revolver, except where noted. All lyrics written by Scott Weiland, except where noted.

No.	Title	Length
1.	"Let It Roll"	2:32
2.	"She Mine"	3:24
3.	"Get Out the Door"	3:14
4.	"She Builds Quick Machines"	4:02
5.	"The Last Fight"	4:03
6.	"Pills, Demons & Etc."	2:54
7.	"American Man"	3:56
8.	"Mary Mary"	4:33
9.	"Just Sixteen"	3:58
10.	"Can't Get It Out of My Head" (Music and lyrics by Jeff Lynne)	3:57
11.	"For a Brother"	3:26
12.	"Spay"	3:06
13.	"Gravedancer" (contains hidden track "Don't Drop That Dime" from 4:40)	8:42
Total length:		51:48

Enhanced edition
No.	Title	Length
14.	"Re-Evolution: Making of Libertad" (making-of video)	10:13
Total length:		62:01

Japanese edition
No.	Title	Length
13.	"Gravedancer"	4:40
14.	"Gas & a Dollar Laugh" (contains hidden track "Don't Drop That Dime" from 3:20)	7:23
15.	"Re-Evolution: Making of Libertad" (making-of video)	10:13
Total length:		55:05

iTunes edition
No.	Title	Length
14.	"Messages"	4:48
15.	"Psycho Killer" (Talking Heads cover. Music and lyrics by David Byrne, Chris Frantz and Tina Weymouth)	4:17
Total length:		60:53

Special edition DVD
No.	Title	Length
1.	"Tierra Roja, Sangre Roja" (South American tour footage)	28:40
Total length:		28:40

== Personnel ==
Velvet Revolver

- Scott Weiland – lead vocals, keyboards on "Get Out the Door" and "The Last Fight", production
- Slash – lead guitar, talkbox on "Get Out the Door", acoustic guitar on "Messages", production
- Duff McKagan – bass, backing vocals, production
- Matt Sorum – drums, percussion on "Get Out the Door", backing vocals, production
- Dave Kushner – rhythm guitar, acoustic guitar on "The Last Fight", production

Additional personnel

- Brendan O'Brien – production, mixing
- Bob Ludwig – mastering
- Billy Bowers – additional engineering
- Douglas Grean – additional engineering
- Rocco Guarino – Video Director

Mixing assistance

- Glenn Pittman
- Kevin Mills
- Matt Serrechio
- Tom Syrowski
- Tom Tapley

== Charts ==
Chart performance for Libertad
Chart (2007)	Peak position
Australian Albums (ARIA)	10
Austrian Albums (Ö3 Austria)	22
Belgian Albums (Ultratop Wallonia)	62
Canadian Albums (Billboard)	2
Danish Albums (Hitlisten)	27
Dutch Albums (Album Top 100)	34
Finnish Albums (Suomen virallinen lista)	4
French Albums (SNEP)	66
German Albums (Offizielle Top 100)	36
Hungarian Albums (MAHASZ)	28
Irish Albums (IRMA)	7
Italian Albums (FIMI)	13
Mexican Albums (Top 100 Mexico)	19
New Zealand Albums (RMNZ)	3
Norwegian Albums (VG-lista)	14
Scottish Albums (Official Charts)	3
Spanish Albums (Promusicae)	44
Swedish Albums (Sverigetopplistan)	14
Swiss Albums (Schweizer Hitparade)	21
UK Albums (Official Charts)	6
US Billboard 200	5

== Certifications ==
Region	Certification	Certified units/sales
Canada (Music Canada)	Gold	50,000^{^}
New Zealand (RMNZ)	Gold	7,500^{^}
United Kingdom (BPI)	Silver	60,000^{*}
^{*} Sales figures based on certification alone.^{^} Shipments figures based on certification alone.
