= The Last Fight (Velvet Revolver song) =

Single by Velvet Revolver

from the album Libertad
- Released: August 20, 2007
- Recorded: December 11, 2006 – February 22, 2007
- Genre: Rock; hard rock; blues rock
- Length: 4:03
- Label: RCA
- Songwriters: Scott Weiland; Slash; Duff McKagan; Matt Sorum; Dave Kushner
- Producer: Brendan O'Brien

Velvet Revolver singles chronology
"She Builds Quick Machines" (2007)	"The Last Fight" (2007)	"Get Out the Door" (2008)

"The Last Fight" is a power ballad by American supergroup Velvet Revolver, and appears on the band's second album, Libertad. The song was released on August 20 as the second single off the album, after "She Builds Quick Machines". The band began promoting the single on K Rock radio in New York City, with an exclusive acoustic performance, and then live on the Late Show with David Letterman on August 22. This song was number 62 on Rolling Stone's list of the 100 Best Songs of 2007.

== Musical composition ==
Like every other song on Libertad, the lyrics were written by lead vocalist Scott Weiland. The song is a tribute to Scott Weiland's younger brother who died of a drug overdose. It starts with a slow drum intro and vocals, the song gets stronger as it progresses until the end.

== Music video ==
On August 3, the band filmed the music video for "The Last Fight" at the Los Angeles Theater in downtown Los Angeles. The video was directed by Rocco Guarino, and premiered on Yahoo! on August 28 and contains a lot of symbolism. First, clouded skies appear, and then in a room Matt Sorum is playing a snare drum. Next, it shows Scott Weiland playing the piano and writing a book which contains the lyrics of the song (one can assume that he is composing it). He is later seen playing with the band on stage. A topless woman is reading the book then puts on a red military jacket and enters a room with various blindfolded people sitting in chairs against the wall. When everyone's blindfolds are removed, they walk into the room where the band is. Slash plays an ES-335 in this video, instead of his usual Les Paul.

Another version of the video simply shows the band performing in a room.

== Track listing ==
1. "The Last Fight" - 4:03

== Personnel ==
- Scott Weiland - lead vocals, keyboards
- Slash - lead guitar
- Duff McKagan - bass, backing vocals
- Matt Sorum - drums, percussion, backing vocals
- Dave Kushner - rhythm guitar

== Chart position ==
Chart (2007)	Peak Position
Canada Hot 100 (Billboard)	72
US Mainstream Rock (Billboard)	16
