= Nick Raskulinecz =

American record producer (born 1970)

- Born: February 4, 1970 (age 56); Knoxville, Tennessee, U.S.
- Genres: Rock; heavy metal; hard rock; alternative rock
- Occupation: Record producer
- Years active: 1995–present
- Website: mcdman.com/raskulinecz

Nick Raskulinecz (/ˌræskəˈlɪnɪks/ RAS-kuh-LIN-iks) (born February 4, 1970) is an American record producer. He resides in Nashville, Tennessee.

== Biography ==
Raskulinecz is from the Bearden area of Knoxville, Tennessee. He first produced and recorded bands in Knoxville on a US$2,700 eight-track recorder that his grandfather bought for him. He played in a popular local thrash/funk band called Hypertribe. Three of their albums were produced at Underground Recording Studio in Seymour, Tennessee, with Matt Lincoln engineering and sharing producing duties. Soon Raskulinecz moved to Los Angeles with his band, now renamed Movement, in 1995, and took a job at Sound City Studios as an assistant, following a suggestion by Brian Bell from Weezer. He eventually became an engineer and learned how to produce.

In 2001, shortly after Raskulinecz left Sound City, he was struggling as an independent engineer at a rehearsal studio and thought of returning to Knoxville with wife Amber. Then Dave Grohl, whom he met engineering the Foo Fighters track "A320" for Godzilla: The Album, invited Raskulinecz to help make the Foo Fighters' next album at Grohl's home studio in Alexandria, Virginia. Raskulinecz, who was set to make his producing debut making Last Call for Vitriol with fellow Knoxvillians Superdrag, instead accepted Grohl's proposal and the result was One by One, released in 2002. The experience was successful and Raskulinecz returned for the Foo Fighters follow-up In Your Honor (2005). He has also mixed the audio on the Foo Fighters DVDs Everywhere but Home, Foo Fighters Live at Wembley Stadium and Skin and Bones, the latter of which was accompanied by the live DVD at Hyde Park, also mixed by Raskulinecz.

In addition to his work with Foo Fighters, he has worked with such artists as Ghost, We As Human, Evanescence, Marilyn Manson, Soil, Deftones, Coheed and Cambria, Stone Sour, Trivium, Duff McKagan, Mondo Generator, Danzig, The Exies, Ash, My Ruin, Korn, Velvet Revolver, Halestorm, Rush, Mastodon, Shadows Fall, Superdrag, Goatsnake, Fireball Ministry, Rye Coalition, Death Angel, Danko Jones, Skid Row, and Apocalyptica.

Raskulinecz produced Snakes & Arrows with Canadian rock trio Rush in 2007. Rush brought back Raskulinecz to co-produce their 2010 singles "Caravan" and "BU2B", and then the album Clockwork Angels, which was released in June 2012. With Rush he earned the nickname "Booujzhe", from his description of how he wanted a particular drum beat to go in a song. Plus, Raskulinecz produced Threads of Life for Shadows Fall.

In September 2007, it was reported that Raskulinecz would produce Killing Season with Filipino American thrash quintet Death Angel. Killing Season is Death Angel's fifth album and was released February 26, 2008.

Raskulinecz produced an album with the Canadian band Thornley. The album, titled Tiny Pictures, was released on February 10, 2009. He was also the producer on Trivium's fourth album Shogun, released in 2008.

Raskulinecz produced Black Gives Way to Blue, the fourth studio album by grunge rock quartet Alice in Chains. Released on September 29, 2009, this was the band's first studio album in 14 years, since their 1995 self-titled Alice in Chains, and its first release with new singer William DuVall following the death of Layne Staley. He is also credited as the producer on The Devil Put Dinosaurs Here (2013) and Rainier Fog (2018).

In 2010, Raskulinecz moved to Nashville with his family, wanting to go back to Tennessee – from which his wife also hails – and raise his family there. At first he worked at Blackbird Studios, where he produced Stone Sour's Audio Secrecy, his second with the band (following Come What(ever) May). Also released that year was Deftones' Diamond Eyes, which Raskulinecz recorded back in California.

Raskulinecz has also worked on Evanescence's third studio album, the self-titled Evanescence, which was released on October 11, 2011. Raskulinecz is currently in the band Epic Ditch with former Superdrag frontman John Davis. In February 2012, Epic Ditch released their vinyl debut "36-Hour" on Velocity of Sound Records in which Nick played bass and also produced the album.

Some of Raskulinecz' latest works include Big Wreck's first album in ten years, Albatross, the seventh studio album by Deftones Koi No Yokan, and second album by Swedish occult rock band Ghost, Infestissumam.

Rock Falcon Studios, Raskulinecz's own recording facility in Franklin, was founded in 2013. The first album done there was The Hold Steady's Teeth Dreams, released in 2014. Also done at Rock Falcon and released that year were Mastodon's Once More 'Round the Sun, and Adelitas Way's third album Stuck. He subsequently co-produced the Bush album Man on the Run. Raskulinecz recorded the first sessions of Sleeping with Sirens' Madness, but the band ended discarding the results aside from two bonus tracks.

In 2015, Raskulinecz produced the cello rock band Apocalyptica's album Shadowmaker, released on April 17, 2015. That same year he produced The Killer Instinct by the Black Star Riders, and this led to Raskulinecz producing a solo EP for guitarist Damon Johnson, Echo. In 2016, he produced Korn's 12th album The Serenity of Suffering, and 13th album The Nothing in 2019. In the 2020s he has continued to produce for Deftones, Evanescence, and others.

== Production credits ==
| Year | Title | Band | Notes |
|---|---|---|---|
| 2000 | In the Valley of Dying Stars | Superdrag | Co-produced with Superdrag |
| 2002 | One by One | Foo Fighters | Co-produced with Adam Kasper |
| 2002 | Kill Your Television | The Reunion Show | Co-produced with The Reunion Show |
| 2003 | Set Me Free | Velvet Revolver | Hulk & Contraband |
| 2004 | Meltdown | Ash | Co-produced with Ash |
| 2004 | Head for the Door | The Exies | |
| 2005 | In Your Honor | Foo Fighters | Played double bass on "On the Mend" and bass on "Cold Day in the Sun" |
| 2006 | Come What(ever) May | Stone Sour | |
| 2007 | Good Apollo, I'm Burning Star IV, Volume Two: No World for Tomorrow | Coheed and Cambria | Co-produced with Rick Rubin |
| 2007 | Dead Planet | Mondo Generator | |
| 2007 | Snakes & Arrows | Rush | |
| 2007 | Arigato! | John Davis | Co-produced with John Davis |
| 2008 | Shogun | Trivium | |
| 2009 | Tiny Pictures | Thornley | |
| 2009 | Black Gives Way to Blue | Alice in Chains | Co-produced with Alice in Chains |
| 2010 | Audio Secrecy | Stone Sour | |
| 2010 | Diamond Eyes | Deftones | |
| 2010 | Black Magic; All Mysteries Revealed | Year Long Disaster | |
| 2011 | Evanescence | Evanescence | |
| 2012 | Albatross | Big Wreck | |
| 2012 | Koi No Yokan | Deftones | |
| 2012 | Clockwork Angels | Rush | |
| 2013 | Infestissumam | Ghost | |
| 2013 | The Devil Put Dinosaurs Here | Alice in Chains | Co-produced with Alice in Chains |
| 2014 | Teeth Dreams | The Hold Steady | |
| 2014 | Once More Round The Sun | Mastodon | |
| 2014 | Stuck | Adelitas Way | |
| 2014 | Sisyphus Says | The Lees Of Memory | |
| 2015 | Man on the Run | Bush | Co-produced with Jay Baumgardner |
| 2015 | Madness | Sleeping With Sirens | Bonus tracks only |
| 2015 | The Killer Instinct | Black Star Riders | |
| 2015 | Shadowmaker | Apocalyptica | |
| 2016 | The Serenity of Suffering | Korn | |
| 2016 | Unnecessary Evil | The Lees Of Memory | |
| 2017 | Wolves | Rise Against | |
| 2017 | (how to live) AS GHOSTS | 10 Years | |
| 2017 | Cold Dark Place | Mastodon | Tracks 1, 2 & 4 |
| 2018 | Rainier Fog | Alice in Chains | Co-produced with Alice in Chains |
| 2018 | Vicious | Halestorm | |
| 2019 | The Nothing | Korn | |
| 2020 | Underneath | Code Orange | Co-produced with Jami Morgan and Will Yip |
| 2020 | Moon Shot | The Lees Of Memory | |
| 2021 | The Bitter Truth | Evanescence | |
| 2022 | The Gang's All Here | Skid Row | |
| 2023 | Yes, And... | '68 | |
| 2023 | Chosen At Random | In the Whale | |
| 2023 | Pages EP | Big Wreck | |
| 2024 | Horizons | Black Smoke Trigger | |
| 2024 | Fire | Kittie | |
| 2024 | "Sound The Alarm" | Our Lady Peace | |
| 2024 | Soundtrack To Summer 2024 | Badflower | |
| 2025 | "Afterlife" | Evanescence | from Netflix series Devil May Cry |
| 2025 | Private Music | Deftones | Co-produced with Deftones |
| 2025 | The Rest of the Story | Big Wreck | |
