= Fall to Pieces (Velvet Revolver song) =

2004 single by Velvet Revolver

Single by Velvet Revolver

from the album Contraband
- B-side: "Surrender"
- Released: August 2, 2004
- Length: 4:30
- Label: RCA
- Songwriter: Velvet Revolver
- Producer: Josh Abraham

Velvet Revolver singles chronology
"Slither" (2004)	"Fall to Pieces" (2004)	"Dirty Little Thing" (2004)

Audio sample
- file; help

Music video
- "Fall to Pieces" on YouTube

"Fall to Pieces" is a song by American hard rock supergroup Velvet Revolver, released in August 2004 as the third single off their debut album, Contraband. The song reached number 67 on the US Billboard Hot 100 and topped the Billboard Mainstream Rock Tracks chart for 11 weeks.

== Content ==
The song's lyrics are about then lead singer Scott Weiland's battle with heroin and its toll on his relationship with his wife, model Mary Forsberg.

== Composition ==
The song is played with 1/2 step down-tuned guitars, unlike most of Velvet Revolver's catalogue. Similar to "Sweet Child o' Mine" by Guns N' Roses (Slash, McKagan and Sorum's previous band), the song is in the key of D-flat Mixolydian, and is based on an arpeggiated riff around the Dsus4 chord. Weiland wrote the lyrics; Slash, McKagan, Kushner, and Sorum composed the music.

== Chart performance ==
The song stayed at number one on the Billboard Mainstream Rock Tracks chart for 11 consecutive weeks and number two on the Billboard Modern Rock Tracks chart for one week. It also reached number 67 on the Billboard Hot 100.

== Music video ==
The song's music video follows the meaning of the song, showing Weiland struggling to maintain his relationship with his wife (who appears in the video as herself). It depicts Scott going through an overdose, but being rescued by Duff McKagan.

== Live performances ==
The band performed the song during their performance at Live 8; its performance is the only one of the three songs they played there that appears on the concert DVD.

== Personnel ==
- Scott Weiland – lead vocals
- Slash – lead guitar
- Duff McKagan – bass guitar, backing vocals
- Matt Sorum – drums, percussion, backing vocals
- Dave Kushner – rhythm guitar

== Charts ==
=== Weekly charts ===
Weekly chart performance for "Fall to Pieces"
Chart (2004–2005)	Peak position
Australia (ARIA)	57
Canada (Nielsen BDS)	14
Canada Rock Top 30 (Radio & Records)	1
Germany (GfK)	89
Ireland (IRMA)	42
Netherlands (Single Top 100)	53
Scottish Singles Sales (Official Charts)	33
UK Singles (Official Charts)	32
UK Rock & Metal (Official Charts)	4
US Billboard Hot 100	67
US Adult Pop Airplay (Billboard)	25
US Alternative Airplay (Billboard)	2
US Mainstream Rock (Billboard)	1

=== Year-end charts ===
2004 year-end chart performance for "Fall to Pieces"
Chart (2004)	Position
US Mainstream Rock Tracks (Billboard)	18
US Modern Rock Tracks (Billboard)	34

2005 year-end chart performance for "Fall to Pieces"
Chart (2005)	Position
US Adult Top 40 (Billboard)	88
US Mainstream Rock Tracks (Billboard)	12
US Modern Rock Tracks (Billboard)	70

== Certifications ==
Certifications for "Fall to Pieces"
Region	Certification	Certified units/sales
United States (RIAA)	Gold	500,000^{^}
^{^} Shipments figures based on certification alone.

== Release history ==
Release dates and formats for "Fall to Pieces"
Region	Date	Format(s)	Label(s)	Ref.
United States	August 2, 2004	Mainstream rock; active rock; alternative radio	RCA	
United Kingdom	October 11, 2004	CD	RCA	
Australia	October 18, 2004	CD	RCA	
United States	October 18, 2004	Contemporary hit radio	RCA	
