= Velvet Revolver =

American hard rock supergroup

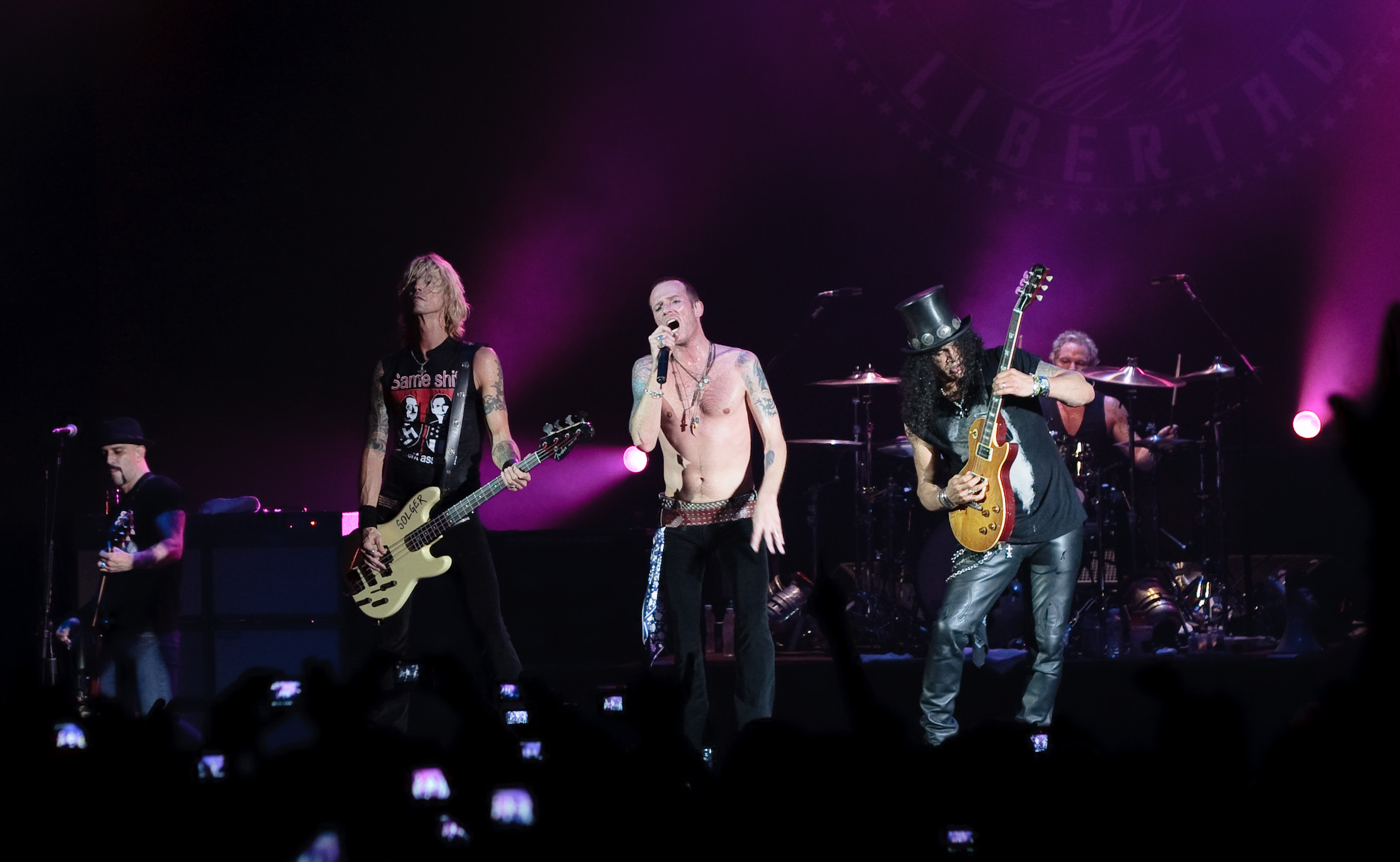
- Velvet Revolver in 2007. From left to right: Dave Kushner, Duff McKagan, Scott Weiland, Slash, Matt Sorum (behind the drums)

Background information
- Origin: Rancho Santa Margarita, California, U.S.
- Genres: Hard rock; alternative metal
- Works: Velvet Revolver discography
- Years active: 2002–2008 (one-off reunions: 2010, 2012)
- Labels: Sony BMG; RCA
- Spinoff of: Guns N' Roses; Kings of Chaos; Loaded; Neurotic Outsiders; Road Crew; Scott Weiland and the Wildabouts; Slash's Snakepit; Stone Temple Pilots
- Past members: Slash; Duff McKagan; Matt Sorum; Dave Kushner; Scott Weiland

Velvet Revolver was an American hard rock supergroup consisting of Guns N' Roses members Slash (lead guitar), Duff McKagan (bass, backing vocals) and Matt Sorum (drums, backing vocals), alongside Dave Kushner (rhythm guitar) formerly of punk band Wasted Youth, and Scott Weiland (lead vocalist) formerly of Stone Temple Pilots. The band formed in 2002 and was active until 2008, when Weiland was fired from the band and subsequently rejoined Stone Temple Pilots.

In 2004, the band achieved commercial success with their debut album, Contraband. Despite positive reviews, some critics initially described Velvet Revolver as a mere combination of Stone Temple Pilots and Guns N' Roses, and criticized them for a "disconnection" between Weiland and the rest of the band. With their single "Slither", they won the 2005 Grammy Award for Best Hard Rock Performance. The band released Libertad in 2007, driven by the release of the single "She Builds Quick Machines", and embarked on a tour with Alice in Chains.

In April 2008, Weiland was fired from Velvet Revolver and reunited with Stone Temple Pilots. Velvet Revolver was put on indefinite hiatus and in November of that year, requested to be released by their record label RCA Records to allow themselves "complete freedom to go through whatever process it would take to accomplish" replacing Weiland.

Although Velvet Revolver worked on new material and auditioned new singers following Scott Weiland's departure, the band has not released any new material and only performed publicly once since 2008, when they reunited with Weiland for a one-off reunion show on January 12, 2012, at a benefit concert. This proved to be their last performance together before Weiland's death on December 3, 2015. Slash and McKagan rejoined Guns N' Roses in 2016.

In 2025, Jeff Mezydlo of Yardbarker included the band in his list of "the greatest metal acts that formed in the 2000s".

== History ==
=== Foundations (2001–2002) ===
Slash, Duff McKagan, and Matt Sorum were members of the hard rock band Guns N' Roses. However, disagreements with singer Axl Rose resulted in Slash leaving the band in 1996 and McKagan departing in 1997 shortly before Sorum was fired. Following their departures the trio focused on separate projects, with Slash reforming Slash's Snakepit and McKagan reforming 10 Minute Warning as well as recording his second solo album, while Sorum rejoined the Cult.

By 2001, Slash's Snakepit had disbanded for the second time. Slash began working with the Black Crowes drummer Steve Gorman and an unnamed bassist on a new project: writing the music for what would become "Fall to Pieces". McKagan reformed Loaded, previously his band for the tour in support of Beautiful Disease, with Geoff Reading. McKagan also added both Mike Squires and Jeff Rouse to the lineup. Following a tour of Japan in 2002, former Zilch, Wasted Youth, Electric Love Hogs, and Dave Navarro guitarist Dave Kushner joined Loaded in place of Mike Squires.

=== Formation (2002–2003) ===
When musician Randy Castillo died from cancer in 2002, Slash, McKagan, and Sorum performed at a benefit concert to raise money and commemorate Castillo, with Josh Todd and Keith Nelson of Buckcherry as well as B-Real and Sen Dog of Cypress Hill. Recognizing that their musical relationship was still intact, the trio began rehearsing with Todd and Nelson, working on material that would become "Dirty Little Thing", but eventually decided against forming a group with them. During a Loaded show at West Hollywood's Viper Room, McKagan re-introduced Dave Kushner to Slash, who had been friends in junior high and high school. Kushner was invited to jam with the group and was soon invited to join with Slash, stating that "Dave brought a cool vibe to what [they] were doing. There was no deliberation; that was it, it was a perfect fit." Their former Guns N' Roses bandmate Izzy Stradlin also joined them for two weeks, eventually suggesting that "Duff and [Stradlin] will sing and [they] will just do a club tour in a van." Slash states in his autobiography that it was hard to tell if Stradlin was serious or kidding. After auditioning Kelly Shaefer of Atheist and Neurotica, Stradlin left the group.

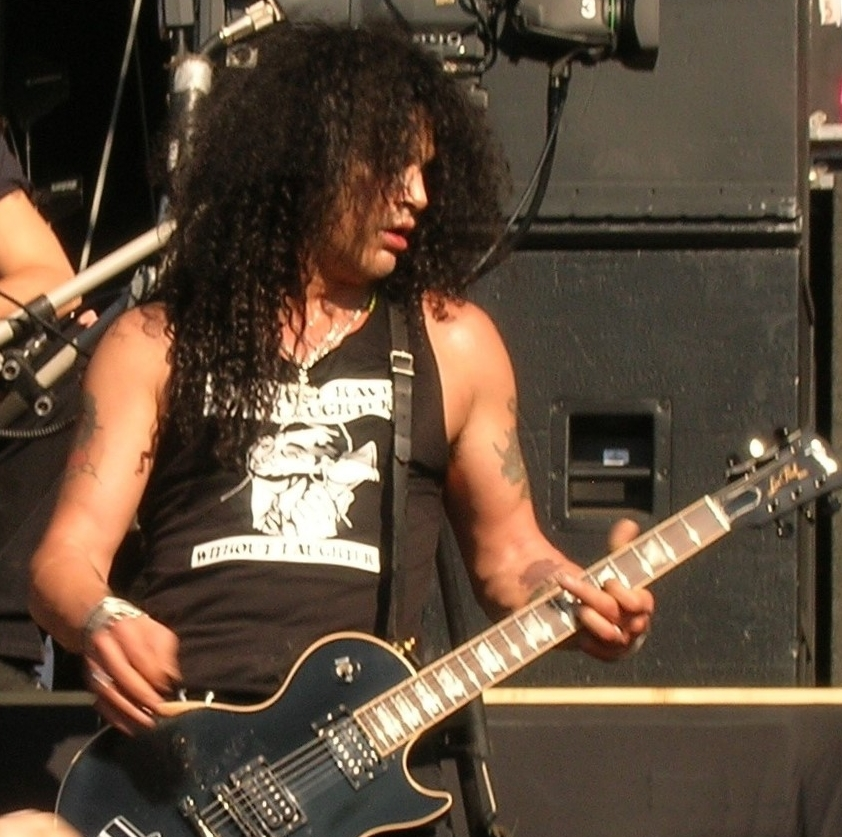
Guitarist Slash performing at a concert in Nijmegen

While Shaefer's audition was unsuccessful, the quartet continued auditioning for a lead singer. VH1 filmed the recruitment process, which was referred to as the temporary name "The Project". The resulting documentary was aired as VH1 Inside Out: The Rise of Velvet Revolver. A number of lead singers auditioned for the band, including Stephen Shareaux of Kik Tracee, Steve Ludwin of Carrie and Little Hell, Todd Kerns, formerly of Age of Electric, Sebastian Bach, formerly of Skid Row, Shawn Albro of U.P.O., Travis Meeks of Days of the New, and Ian Thornley of Big Wreck. Myles Kennedy, formerly of the Mayfield Four, declined an invitation from Sorum to audition. Ian Astbury of the Cult and Mike Patton of Faith No More also declined audition offers. The band were also interested in auditioning Stone Temple Pilots singer Scott Weiland, who had become friends with McKagan after attending the same gym. Weiland once played on the same bill as Kushner, and was in rehab at the same time as Sorum. Weiland was sent two discs of material, and felt that the first disc "sounded like Bad Company gone wrong." When he was sent the second disc, Weiland was more positive, comparing it to Core-era Stone Temple Pilots, though he turned them down because Stone Temple Pilots were still together.

I just thought he was a great singer, and he'd always been on my mind for this band. He was the one vocalist that I knew had the kind of voice that would serve what we were going to do: he had a John Lennon-ish quality, a little bit of Jim Morrison, and a touch of almost David Bowie. He was the best singer to come out in a long time in my opinion.

— Slash on Scott Weiland

When Stone Temple Pilots disbanded in 2003, the band sent Weiland new music, which he took into his studio and added vocals. This music eventually became the song "Set Me Free". Weiland was still unsure whether or not he wanted to join, despite delivering the music to the band himself and performing at an industry showcase at Mates. They recorded two songs with producer Nick Raskulinecz, a recorded version of "Set Me Free" and a cover of Pink Floyd's "Money", for the soundtracks to the movies Hulk and The Italian Job, respectively. Weiland joined the band soon after. "Set Me Free" managed to peak at number 17 on the Mainstream Rock Chart without any radio promotion or a record label.

It was prior to a screening of The Hulk at Universal Studios that the band chose a name. After seeing a movie by Revolution Studios, Slash liked the beginning of the word, eventually thinking of Revolver because of its multiple meanings; the name of a gun, subtext of a revolving door which suited the band as well as the name of a Beatles album. When he suggested Revolver to the band, Weiland suggested back Black Velvet Revolver, liking the idea of "something intimate like velvet juxtaposed with something deadly like a gun." They eventually arrived at Velvet Revolver, announcing it at a press conference and performance showcase at the El Rey Theatre while also performing the songs "Set Me Free" and "Slither" as well as covers of Nirvana's "Negative Creep", Sex Pistols' "Bodies", and Guns N' Roses' "It's So Easy".

=== Contraband and mainstream success (2003–2005) ===
Slither
A sample of "Slither" from Contraband. The band's debut single topped both the Mainstream and Modern Rock Chart. It is considered the band's signature song and is frequently the closer to their shows.

Fall to Pieces
A sample of "Fall to Pieces" from Contraband. The second single released by Velvet Revolver topped the Mainstream Rock Chart.

Prior to the recording of their debut album, Weiland took material that the band had previously written to his studio, Lavish, in Toluca Lake. With engineer Doug Grean, Weiland rearranged the music to fit his vocals, eventually coming out with the songs "Big Machine" and "Dirty Little Thing". The band worked on new material for songs such as "You Got No Right", "Slither", "Sucker Train Blues", and "Do It for the Kids", among others. During this time Weiland was arrested at the parking lot of his studio for drug possession. Upon release from jail, he wrote lyrics to material he was given previously, writing the lyrics to the song "Fall to Pieces". Velvet Revolver soon began recording their debut album. Initially, they recorded "Slither" with producer Bob Ezrin at Henson Studios, but were dissatisfied with the result. After recording "Headspace" with Josh Abraham, the band liked the track enough to do the rest of the album with him.

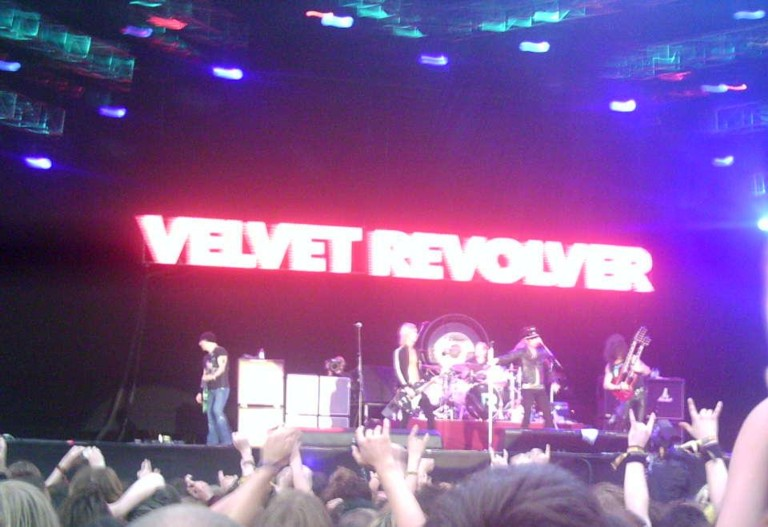
Velvet Revolver performing at Download Festival in 2005

Velvet Revolver soon gained major-label attention with Warner Bros. and Chrysalis. RCA and Elektra were also interested in signing the band. They eventually signed with RCA Records. They recorded their album at NRG Recording Studios, while Slash recorded his guitar parts at a smaller studio on the southern corner between Highland Avenue and Sunset Boulevard. During recording, Weiland could only work for three hours a day due to a court order mandating that he stay in a halfway house. The marketing campaign for Velvet Revolver in the run-up to the release of the first album was profiled as part of the Frontline program The Way the Music Died, which included interviews with the band members and producers.

The resulting album, Contraband, was released on June 8, 2004. Helped by the success of the single "Slither", it debuted at number one on the Billboard 200, selling over 250,000 copies in the first week. Contraband went on to sell four million copies worldwide, 2.9 million of which were sold in the United States, and was certified 2× platinum by the RIAA. Both "Slither" and "Fall to Pieces" peaked at number one on the Mainstream Rock Chart as well as number 56 and 67 on the Billboard Hot 100, respectively. "Slither" also peaked at number one on the Modern Rock Chart and number 35 on the UK Singles Chart. The album's third single, "Dirty Little Thing", peaked at number eight on the Mainstream Rock chart.

Critically, the album was generally well received. Despite being praised for its hedonism and maturity, critics noted a disconnection between "singer and band". Velvet Revolver won the Kerrang! Award for Best International Newcomer in 2004, and the following year they won the Best Hard Rock Performance Grammy Award for "Slither". They were also nominated for Rock Artist of the Year at the Billboard Music Awards while "Fall to Pieces" was nominated for a Song of the Year/Rock Radio Radio Music Award. They recorded a new song, "Come On, Come In", for the 2005 movie Fantastic Four, which peaked at number 14 on the Mainstream Rock Chart. "Fall to Pieces" then re-entered the charts, peaking at number twenty-five on the Adult Top 40 the same year.

Velvet Revolver toured extensively for nineteen months in support of Contraband. They toured both the US and Europe twice, while also performing in Australia, New Zealand, and Japan. They performed at Live 8 and various festivals including Download Festival, as well as Ozzfest. During the tour, the band members, with the exception of Kushner, began to relapse on alcohol and drugs. Though they got clean in time for the recording of their new album, Slash felt that "[the band] lost [Weiland]" and "thought the overall spirit of everything was declining at that point."

=== Libertad and departure of Scott Weiland (2005–2008) ===
She Builds Quick Machines
A sample of "She Builds Quick Machines" from Libertad. The band's first single from Libertad represents a change in music style compared to previous singles.

Weiland announced in 2005 that Velvet Revolver's next album would be titled Libertad and would be a concept album. When they started writing material, they decided against the concept idea. Initially, the band started working with producer Rick Rubin on the album. However, due to his methods, such as having a crew to do the work and engineering while only popping in occasionally, and because he was also working with other bands at the same time, they decided against continuing with Rubin. At the suggestion of Weiland, Velvet Revolver began working with Brendan O'Brien. Slash stated that O' Brien "brought more than just discipline to the equation, he brought a musicality that stems from the fact that he plays guitar, bass and drums. At any given moment he could play along [with the band] and it really helped the process." While writing for the album, Weiland believed that his bandmates were going to reunite with Guns N' Roses when the band's manager was talking to Axl Rose about switching management companies, and were not going to record their second album. He was later convinced by the band that this was not the case.

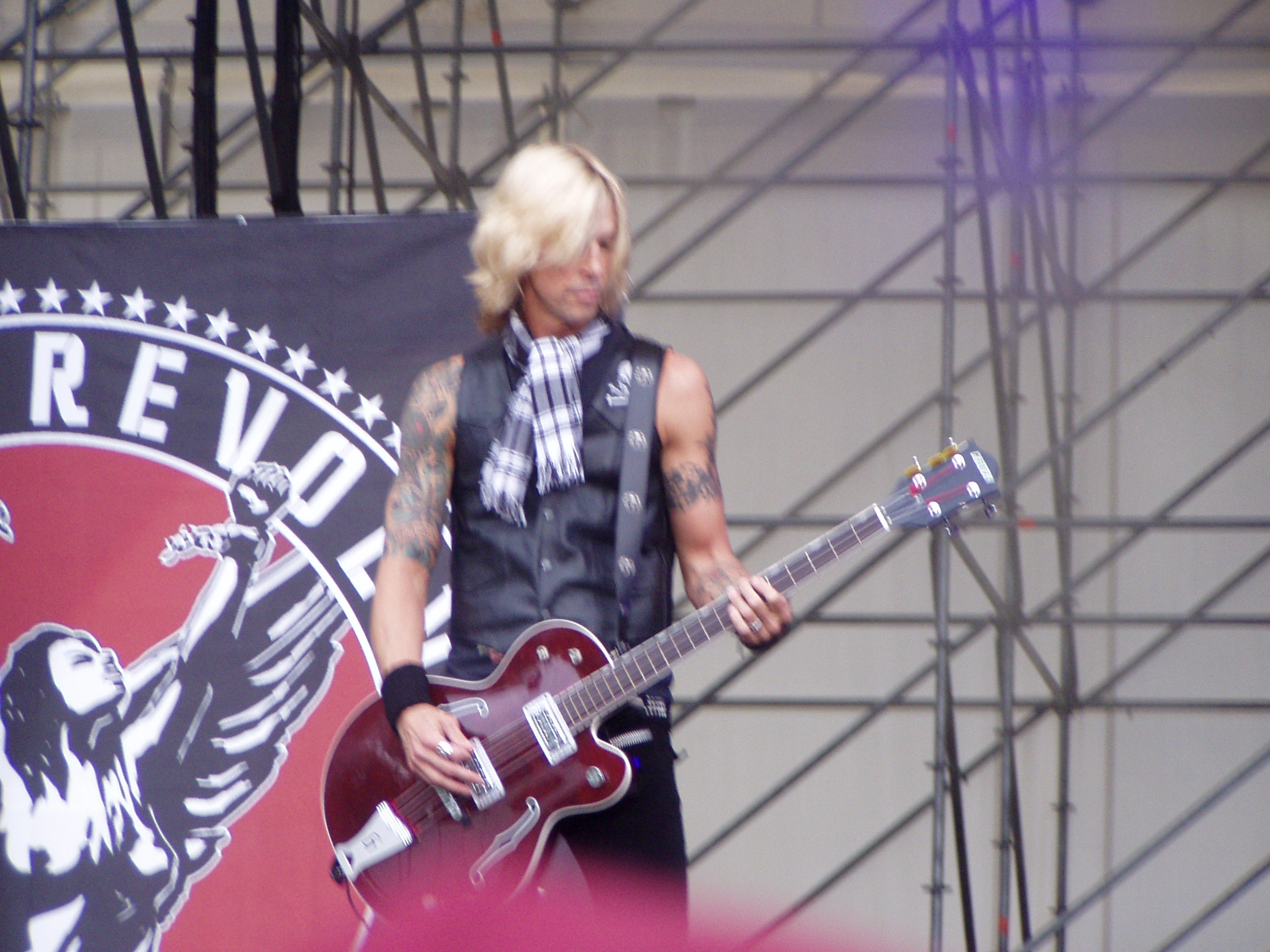
Bassist Duff McKagan performing at Gods of Metal in 2007

Following the completion of the album, Velvet Revolver performed for and inducted Van Halen into the Rock and Roll Hall of Fame, with Weiland and Slash speaking on the band's behalf, on March 12, 2007. The band played a medley of "Ain't Talkin' 'bout Love" and "Runaround". Shows in South America with Aerosmith followed in April. They released the EP Melody and the Tyranny on June 1 to serve as a precursor to the release of their new album, which featured two songs from Libertad, a cover of Talking Heads song "Psycho Killer" and a video documentary about the making of Libertad as well as a live video of the band performing "Do It for the Kids".

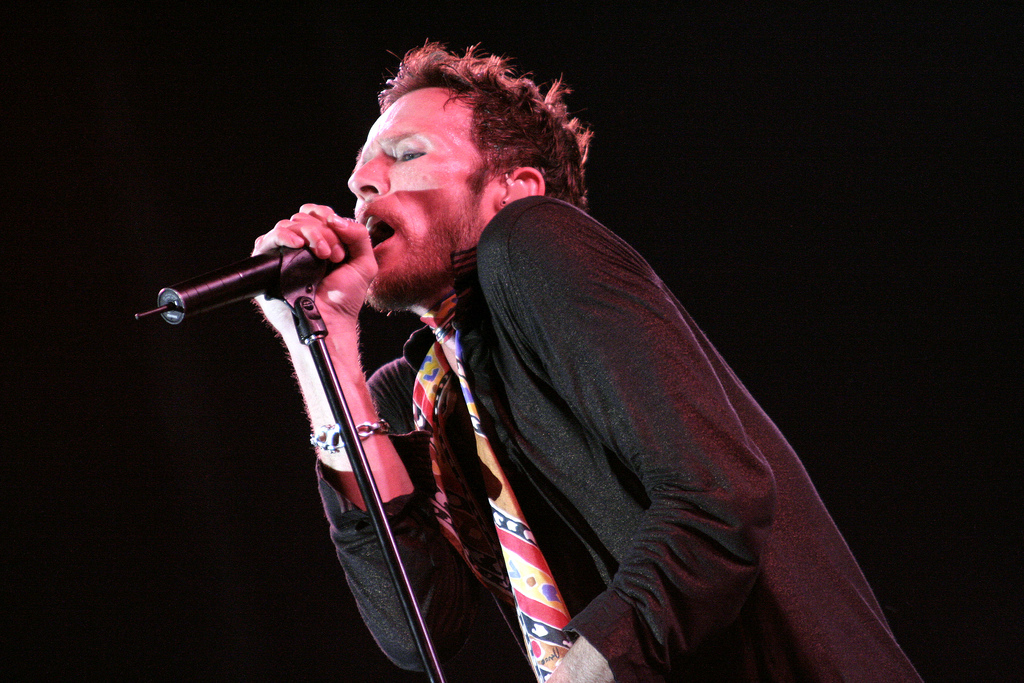
Former singer Scott Weiland. Velvet Revolver's April 1 show at the Heineken Music Hall in the Netherlands was at the time the band's last performance with Weiland.

Libertad was released on July 3, 2007, peaking at number five on the Billboard 200. The album's first single, "She Builds Quick Machines", peaked at 74 on the Hot Canadian Digital Singles. The second and third singles, "The Last Fight" and "Get Out the Door", peaked at number 16 and 34 on the Mainstream Rock Chart, respectively. Critical reception to the album was mixed. Though some critics praised the album and felt that Libertad gave the band an identity of their own, outside of the Guns N' Roses and Stone Temple Pilots comparisons, others described the album as "bland" and noted that the band had yet to gel with them "play[ing] to their strengths instead of finding a collective sound."

In support of Libertad, Velvet Revolver toured North America with Alice in Chains from August to October 2007. They also performed at the Virgin Festival, Gods of Metal, and Download in 2007. A November tour of Japan was canceled after they were denied visas, and in 2008, a tour of Australia was postponed, due to health issues, and later canceled following Weiland's decision to voluntarily enter a rehab facility. On November 21, 2007, Weiland was arrested after crashing his car while driving on an L.A. highway. He was charged with driving under the influence of drugs with a prior conviction and later released on $40,000 bail. Velvet Revolver then toured both the US and the UK, as well as some European shows, on the Rock n' Roll as It Should Be tour from January 24 to April 1, 2008. They also played at the Dubai Desert Rock Festival on March 8 the same year. During the tour, Weiland "got back into his old ways", which started to take their toll on the rest of the band with the cancellation of the Australian tour seen as the "final blow".

On the UK tour, the band members never spoke with Weiland, with the exception of a few arguments around the stage. Tensions came to a head during Velvet Revolver's Glasgow show on March 20, 2008, where Weiland announced to the crowd that it was the band's last tour, unaware that the other band members were already planning on firing him. After Sorum posted a message about the show on his website, Weiland issued a statement through Blabbermouth.net in response, saying he "made many attempts to remain cordial with the members of [Velvet Revolver], but mainly, the likes of [Sorum]" and that "[the band] were a gang. But ego and jealousy can get the better of anyone." Slash later stated that it would not be Velvet Revolver's last tour. Weiland's departure was announced on April 1. Weiland also departed the cover band Camp Freddy, which also featured Sorum, and reunited with Stone Temple Pilots, before being fired in 2013.

=== Search for a new singer and solo careers (2008–2015) ===
After Weiland's departure, the band began recording and searching for a new singer. The search was sporadic with the band spending some time auditioning singers, then turning into solo projects, returning to the band, then abandoning it again. Several names were rumored to be auditioning for the band through the years. Myles Kennedy (Alter Bridge) was strongly rumored due to his collaborations with Slash; Lenny Kravitz, Chester Bennington of Linkin Park, Steve Isaacs formerly of Skycycle and the Panic Channel, Royston Langdon of Spacehog, Donovan Leitch of Camp Freddy, Ours singer Jimmy Gnecco and Scars on Broadway guitarist Franky Perez, as well as previous auditionee Sebastian Bach. Ex-Slash's Snakepit lead vocalist Rod Jackson was rumoured to audition, but Slash stated that he would not collaborate with Jackson again, citing his poor work ethic and unreliability. Kushner later revealed that Perez was officially hired by the band as vocalist for a brief time in 2008.

Slash, McKagan, and Sorum all contributed to the song "Kissed It" for the Macy Gray album The Sellout, which was released on June 22, 2010. Despite not featuring Kushner, the trio were credited as Velvet Revolver on the album. The band released their first concert DVD on November 16, 2010, Live In Houston, which was filmed June 18, 2004, at the Verizon Wireless Theater while the band was touring in support of Contraband. Slash, McKagan and Sorum made a performance at the Road Recovery benefit concert on September 13 with a guest appearance from Kushner.

Velvet Revolver reunited for a one-off performance with Scott Weiland at a benefit concert for the late John O'Brien, on January 12, 2012. Following a benefit show for the Road Recovery in 2011 with the other Velvet Revolver members, each one agreed to a one-off reunion before Kushner invited Weiland, who also agreed. Kushner also stated it was then unknown what Velvet Revolver's plans were for the future after the reunion show; "I know everyone's got other commitments, but I think everyone's like, 'Let's get this thing done and get through this and then we'll see.'"

In April 2012, Weiland remarked that he would like to reunite permanently with Velvet Revolver, saying that "if Maynard James Keenan can do it with A Perfect Circle and Tool, then there's no reason why I shouldn't go and do it with both bands". Further in May in an interview with ABC Radio Weiland said that he had reunited with the band permanently for a tour and an album, which was denied a few days later by Slash in an interview with 93X.

On May 12, 2014, in an interview at the MusiCares benefit concert, Slash told journalist Lucas H. Gordon that he "think[s] [they're] gonna audition a singer" in the future. However, he also stated that he would be touring with his solo band "for the next year and a half."

On June 29, 2014, in an interview to Totalrock radio, Duff McKagan revealed that there had been at least one audition for the role of lead vocalist, but that the person did not properly impress the remaining band members. He also stated he would not be the band's lead vocalist.

On December 3, 2015, Weiland was found dead on his tour bus around 9 pm, one day before he was to perform in Minnesota with his band the Wildabouts, which ended the possible reunion. Both Slash and McKagan rejoined Guns N' Roses in 2016.

== Musical style ==
Velvet Revolver's first album, Contraband, was described by Johnny Loftus of AllMusic as an "updated version of Guns N' Roses swagger behind Scott Weiland's glammy, elastic vocals." David Browne of Entertainment Weekly stated that "[a]nyone expecting Use Your Illusion III, though, will be in for a slight buzzkill" and that "[t]he songs suggest the pop grunge of Weiland's old band more than the careening overdrive of GN'R." A number of reviewers made some comparisons to the members' previous bands, with PopMatters reviewer David Powell stating that "Contraband is a pretty good record of unpretentious rock and roll that suffers from inevitable comparison with the best efforts of its parent bands." He went on to state that while Velvet Revolver's "heritage is evident on most of the songs", Contraband "improves with repeat listening, which is encouraging." Velvet Revolver's second album, Libertad, saw the band's style change with the presence of producer Brendan O'Brien, noted by AllMusic reviewer Stephen Thomas Erlewine. Erlewine also stated that "too often, there are concessions between Weiland and the others during the course of a song." Tom Sinclair of Entertainment Weekly stated that Libertad "feels both comfortingly familiar and vaguely exotic." Songs such as "Let it Roll" and "She Mine" have seen some comparisons to the Doors, the Rolling Stones and the Stooges, as noted by San Francisco Chronicle reviewer Jaan Uhelszki. The New York Post commented that "Slash's guitar riffs throughout this new record are as aggressive as a caged cat" and "singer Scott Weiland's vocals are crisp and controlled yet passionate."

== Members ==
- Slash – lead guitar, talkbox, backing vocals (2002–2008, 2010, 2012)
- Duff McKagan – bass, backing vocals (2002–2008, 2010, 2012)
- Matt Sorum – drums, percussion, backing vocals (2002–2008, 2010, 2012)
- Dave Kushner – rhythm guitar (2002–2008, 2010, 2012)
- Scott Weiland – lead vocals, keyboards (2003–2008, 2010, 2012; died 2015)

== Discography ==
Studio albums

- Contraband (2004)
- Libertad (2007
- Vandalism (Canceled)

== Awards and nominations ==
Velvet Revolver awards and nominations
Awards and nominations
Award	Wins	Nominations
Billboard Music Awards	0	1
Grammy Awards	1	3
Kerrang! Awards	1	0
Radio Music Awards	0	1

Totals (Note: Certain award groups do not simply award one winner. They acknowledge several different recipients, have runners-up, and have third place. Since this is a specific recognition and is different from losing an award, runner-up mentions are considered wins in this award tally. For simplification and to avoid errors, each award in this list has been presumed to have had a prior nomination.)
- Wins: 2
- Nominations: 5

Velvet Revolver have received one Grammy Award. The band won the Grammy when "Slither" was nominated for Best Hard Rock Performance in 2005. The song "Fall to Pieces" received a nomination for Song of the Year/Rock Radio Radio Music Award in 2005. The band won the Best International Newcomer Kerrang! Award in 2004 while they were nominated for a Rock Artist of the Year Billboard Music Award in 2005.

Billboard Music Awards

Billboard Music Awards were awarded annually by Billboard magazine.

Year	Nominee / work	Award	Result
2005	Velvet Revolver	Rock Artist of the Year	Nominated

Grammy Awards

The Grammy Awards are bestowed annually by the National Academy of Recording Arts and Sciences.

Year	Nominee / work	Award	Result
2005	"Slither"	Best Hard Rock Performance	Won
2005	"Fall to Pieces"	Best Rock Song	Nominated
2005	Contraband	Best Rock Album	Nominated

Kerrang! Awards

Kerrang! Awards are given annually by Kerrang! Magazine.

Year	Nominee / work	Award	Result
2004	Velvet Revolver	Best International Newcomer	Won

Radio Music Awards

The Radio Music Awards were awarded annually honoring the most successful songs on mainstream radio.

Year	Nominee / work	Award	Result
2005	"Fall to Pieces"	Song of the Year/Rock Radio	Nominated

Teen Choice Awards

Year	Nominee / work	Award	Result	Ref.
2005	Velvet Revolver	Choice Rock Group	Nominated	
