= Slither (song) =

2004 single by Velvet Revolver

Single by Velvet Revolver

from the album Contraband
- Released: April 12, 2004
- Genre: Hard rock; alternative rock
- Length: 4:08
- Label: RCA; BMG
- Songwriter: Velvet Revolver
- Producer: Josh Abraham

Velvet Revolver singles chronology
"Set Me Free" (2003)	"Slither" (2004)	"Fall to Pieces" (2004)

Music video
- "Slither" on YouTube

Audio sample
- file; help

"Slither" is a song by American hard rock band Velvet Revolver from their 2004 debut album, Contraband. Released as the second single from the album in April 2004, "Slither" topped both the US Billboard Mainstream Rock Tracks and Modern Rock Tracks charts, as well as reaching number 56 on the main Billboard Hot 100 chart and number 35 on the UK Singles Chart. The song won the 2005 Grammy for Best Hard Rock Performance.

== Composition ==
"Slither" is a hard rock and alternative rock song. Scott Weiland said, "The lyrics are about a relationship. 'When you look you see right through me, cut the rope, fell to my knees, born and broken every single time.' It's just feeling not right in a situation."

== Music video ==
The video, directed by Kevin Kerslake, was filmed in Prague, Czech Republic and Los Angeles. It starts with the band members playing their instruments inside a tunnel while a woman is driving a car seeking for the way to get to that tunnel. As the song continues, people become much more aggressive and the underground concert reaches a peak as band members play hard. Often in the video, Scott Weiland is seen standing before a wall made of human skulls.

== Success and awards ==
"Slither" was awarded a Grammy in 2005 for Best Hard Rock Performance, an award Weiland had won with his previous band, Stone Temple Pilots, for the song "Plush" in 1994. In 2009, the song was named the 85th-best hard rock song of all time by VH1.

After Velvet Revolver members Slash and Duff McKagan rejoined their former band Guns N' Roses in 2016, Guns N' Roses began regularly playing "Slither" live starting at a concert in Berlin, Germany on June 3, 2018.

== Track listings ==
European two-track edition
No.	Title	Writer(s)	Length
1.	"Slither"	Scott Weiland; Slash; Duff McKagan; Matt Sorum; Dave Kushner	4:08
2.	"Negative Creep" (Nirvana cover)	Kurt Cobain	4:17

European three-track edition
No.	Title	Writer(s)	Length
1.	"Slither"	Weiland; Slash; McKagan; Sorum; Kushner	4:08
2.	"Bodies" (live Sex Pistols cover)	John Lydon; Steve Jones; Paul Cook	3:19
3.	"Negative Creep" (Nirvana cover)	Cobain	4:17

United Kingdom double CD edition (disc one)
No.	Title	Writer(s)	Length
1.	"Slither"	Weiland; Slash; McKagan; Sorum; Kushner	4:08
2.	"Bodies" (live Sex Pistols cover)	Lydon; Jones; Cook	3:19
3.	"Negative Creep" (Nirvana cover)	Cobain	4:17

United Kingdom double CD edition (disc two)
No.	Title	Writer(s)	Length
1.	"Slither"	Weiland; Slash; McKagan; Sorum; Kushner	4:08
2.	"Money" (Pink Floyd cover)	Roger Waters; David Gilmour	7:38
3.	"Set Me Free" (live)	Weiland; Slash; McKagan; Sorum; Kushner	7:11

United Kingdom 12" picture disc (side A)
No.	Title	Writer(s)	Length
1.	"Slither"	Weiland; Slash; McKagan; Sorum; Kushner	4:08

United Kingdom 12" picture disc (side B)
No.	Title	Writer(s)	Length
1.	"Set Me Free"	Weiland; Slash; McKagan; Sorum; Kushner	4:07

== Personnel ==
- Scott Weiland – lead vocals
- Slash – lead guitar, talkbox on "Money"
- Duff McKagan – bass guitar, backing vocals
- Matt Sorum – drums
- Dave Kushner – rhythm guitar

== Chart performance ==
The song reached No. 1 on the Billboard Mainstream Rock Tracks chart, and stayed there for nine weeks. It also became their sole No. 1 hit on the Modern Rock Tracks chart, maintaining the position for four weeks. "Slither" also charted at No. 56 on the Billboard Hot 100, making it Velvet Revolver's highest-charting song and one of the highest-charting songs that Scott Weiland has appeared on.

=== Weekly charts ===
Chart (2004)	Peak position
Australia (ARIA)	26
Canada (Nielsen BDS)	21
Canada Rock Top 30 (Radio & Records)	1
Finland (Suomen virallinen lista)	17
France (SNEP)	81
Ireland (IRMA)	47
Italy (FIMI)	38
Netherlands (Single Top 100)	46
Norway (VG-lista)	12
Scottish Singles Sales (Official Charts)	34
Sweden (Sverigetopplistan)	58
UK Singles (Official Charts)	35
UK Rock & Metal (Official Charts)	1
US Billboard Hot 100	56
US Alternative Airplay (Billboard)	1
US Mainstream Rock (Billboard)	1

=== Year-end charts ===
Chart (2004)	Position
US Mainstream Rock Tracks (Billboard)	2
US Modern Rock Tracks (Billboard)	10

== Certifications ==
Region	Certification	Certified units/sales
United Kingdom (BPI)	Silver	200,000^{‡}
United States (RIAA)	Gold	500,000^{^}
^{^} Shipments figures based on certification alone.^{‡} Sales+streaming figures based on certification alone.

== Release history ==
Region	Date	Format(s)	Label(s)	Ref.
United States	April 12, 2004	Mainstream rock; active rock; alternative radio	RCA; BMG	
Australia	May 24, 2004	CD	RCA; BMG	
Denmark	May 24, 2004	CD	RCA; BMG	
United Kingdom	July 12, 2004	CD	RCA; BMG	
