= Songs of Anarchy: Music from Sons of Anarchy Seasons 1–4 =

Soundtrack album by Various Artists
- Released: November 29, 2011
- Genre: Rock
- Length: 60:15
- Label: Columbia
- Producers: Bob Thiele Jr., Kurt Sutter, Dave Kushner, Matt Hyde, Matt Drenik, Lions

Professional ratings
Review scores
Source	Rating
Allmusic	3.5/5 stars
Contactmusic.com	(mixed)

Songs of Anarchy: Music from Sons of Anarchy Seasons 1–4 is a soundtrack album featuring music from FX television program Sons of Anarchy. The album consists of songs recorded for the show as well as those previously released through a number of EPs; Sons of Anarchy: North Country (2009), Sons of Anarchy: Shelter (2009) and Sons of Anarchy: The King is Gone (2010). Songs include covers of "What a Wonderful World", "Forever Young", "John the Revelator and the Emmy nominated theme song "This Life" (performed by Curtis Stigers and the Forest Rangers). Musicians performing on the album include Anvil, Franky Perez (of Scars on Broadway), Lions, Alison Mosshart (of The Kills and The Dead Weather) and actress Katey Sagal, who plays Gemma Teller Morrow in the show, among others. The album was released on November 29, 2011, through Columbia Records.

== Track listing ==
No.	Title	Writer(s)	Artist	Length
1.	"This Life"	Curtis Stigers, Dave Kushner, Bob Thiele Jr., Kurt Sutter	Curtis Stigers and The Forest Rangers	2:20
2.	"Son of a Preacher Man"	John Hurley, Ronnie Wilkins	Katey Sagal and the Forest Rangers	3:12
3.	"Forever Young"	Bob Dylan	Audra Mae and the Forest Rangers	3:12
4.	"John the Revelator"	Traditional	Curtis Stigers and the Forest Rangers	5:35
5.	"Fortunate Son"	John Fogerty	Lyle Workman and the Forest Rangers	3:29
6.	"Slip Kid"	Pete Townshend	Anvil and Franky Perez	3:49
7.	"Girl from the North Country"	Dylan	Lions	4:11
8.	"Someday Never Comes"	Fogerty	Billy Valentine and the Forest Rangers	4:04
9.	"Gimme Shelter"	Jagger/Richards	Paul Brady and the Forest Rangers	4:52
10.	"Bird On a Wire"	Leonard Cohen	Katey Sagal and the Forest Rangers	5:02
11.	"Hey Hey, My My"	Neil Young, Jeff Blackburn	Battleme	2:49
12.	"What a Wonderful World"	Bob Thiele, George David Weiss	Alison Mosshart and the Forest Rangers	2:31
13.	"Los Tiempos Van Cambiando (The Times They Are a-Changin')"	Dylan	Franky Perez and Los Guardianes del Bosque	4:58
14.	"Strange Fruit"	Abel Meeropol	Katey Sagal and the Forest Rangers (featuring Blake Mills)	4:04
15.	"The House of the Rising Sun"	Traditional	Battleme and the Forest Rangers (with Katey Sagal)	6:07
16.	"The House of the Rising Sun"	Traditional	The White Buffalo (with the Forest Rangers)	5:21

== Charts ==
Chart (2011)	Peak position
US Billboard 200	130
US Top Rock Albums	18
US Top Soundtracks	12

Chart (2012)	Peak position
US Top Soundtracks	9

Chart (2013)	Peak position
US Top Soundtracks	9

Chart (2014)	Peak position
US Top Soundtracks	9

== Personnel ==
The album's credits and personnel can be obtained from Allmusic.

Anvil

- Steve Kudlow – vocals, guitars
- Glenn Gyorffy – bass
- Robb Reiner – drums

The Forest Rangers

- Bob Thiele Jr. — guitar, acoustic guitar, bass, piano, organ, keyboard, synthesizer, vocal harmonies
- Greg Leisz — guitar, banjo, lap steel guitar, mandolin
- John Philip Shenale — organ, piano, Mexican harp
- Lyle Workman — vocals, guitar
- Dave Kushner — guitar, bass
- Davey Faragher — bass
- Brian Macleod – drums, hand drums

Lions

- Matt Drenik – vocals, guitar, piano
- Austin Kalman – lead guitar, backing vocals
- Mike Sellman – bass, backing vocals
- Jake Perlman – drums

Additional musicians

- Katey Sagal — vocals, backing vocals
- Curtis Stigers — vocals
- Audra Mae — vocals
- Franky Perez — vocals
- Paul Brady — vocals
- Alison Mosshart — vocals
- Billy Valentine – vocals, backing vocals
- Gia Ciambotti — backing vocals
- Arielle Smolin – backing vocals
- Owen Thiele – backing vocals
- Jackson White – backing vocals
- Sarah White — backing vocals
- Kim Yarborough – backing vocals
- Bob Glaub — bass
- Pete Thomas — drums
- Zac Rae – organ

Production personnel

- Bob Thiele Jr. — producer, arranger
- Kurt Sutter — producer, arranger
- Dave Kushner – producer
- Matt Hyde — producer, engineer, mixer
- Matt Drenik – producer, engineer, mixer
- Lions — producer
- Jason Buntz – engineer
- Brian Scheuble – engineer, mixer
- Dave Way — engineer, mixer
- Ed Cherney – mixer
- Dave Warren – cover art, design
