= The Forest Rangers (band) =

American rock band

The Forest Rangers is a roots rock band best known for songs from the TV series Sons of Anarchy. The music they created for the TV series was nominated 3 times for Emmy Awards, while it has won 2 HMMA awards and 1 OFTA television award. shaping the series and captivating audiences from 2008 until 2014.

The band was assembled and led by Bob Thiele Jr. (musician and music supervisor), Dave Way. Bob Thiele Jr., and Dave Kushner (guitarist with Velvet Revolver) chose the band's name while writing the show's theme song "This Life" inspired by a Plexi's song named "Forest Ranger". The Forest Rangers went on creating a sound that is consistent with the environment these characters live and breathe in, The Sound of Charming. While the Mayans M.C. listen to Latino music, we never hear anything but rock and country playing in the Charming clubhouse.

"If there was a house band playing at the Sons of Anarchy's clubhouse every Friday night, the Forest Rangers would be the band. The Rangers—heard almost every week on the popular FX drama Sons of Anarchy—wouldn't be out of place hanging at the Teller-Morrow clubhouse in Charming, California." Bob Thiele Jr.

The regular band members are Davey Faragher on bass guitar, John Philip Shenale (often mentioned as Phil Shenale) on keyboards, Greg Leisz on pedal steel guitar, Matt Chamberlain on drums, and Gia Ciambotti on background vocals. The band also collaborates with guest performers for vocals like Alison Mosshart, Amos Lee, Joshua James, The White Buffalo, Billy Valentine, Audra Mae, Justin Warfield, Battleme, Katey Sagal, and others.

== Sonic style ==
Sons of Anarchy redefined how a TV series utilizes music as a powerful narrative element since music plays the role of a character. The soundtrack fits so well because the songs feel exactly what the characters themselves would choose to listen to. Following Kurt Sutter's vision, Thiele Jr. shaped the series' unique music style which consists of a jambalaya of original music and covers from established artists but mostly from indie artists and bands. A lot of the music from the show comes from not just biker bands that existed around the time the MCs became an iconic American entity but also blues bands.

Because of the production's small budget for music, Bob Thiele Jr. went to independents in order to include "big-ticket copyrights". As a music supervisor, he knew how essential it is for artists and writers to get songs on TV shows for their exposure to the audience, for example The White Buffalo gained significant career traction and an Emmy nomination from his collaboration with Bob Thiele Jr. and The Forest Rangers. Haunting covers of well known songs by voices you couldn't recognize when they first aired compliment the hero's tragic journey along with original songs and enhance the audience's emotional journey to catharsis.

"I brought Bob into the process early to really try to figure out how to create a sound for the show since I just knew that Sons Of Anarchy was a somewhat bleak world and we were going to be dealing with somewhat dark and potentially heavy subject matter. It was really Bob's idea to create a unique sound for the show. Going back to the origins of the subculture and when and how it hit the media, what we needed to do is hit on what the sound in the subculture is–sort of that 60's California sound, which sort of became our touchstone" Kurt Sutter

The music created by Bob Thiele Jr. and The Forest Rangers serves the story of SoA. Music doesn't underscores the scene but a lot of times it's leading it, forming a connection between the present and the past. The Hamlet theme of Sons of Anarchy (Clay kills "JT", John Teller, Jax's father and then marries Jax's mother, Gemma; Jax discovers the murder, is in anguish and begins his slow plotting of revenge) is underlinded by the theme song of the series which keeps reminding us that we "Got to look this life in the eye" (This Life by Curtis Stigers, Dave Kushner and Bob Thiele Jr.) because "something is rotten in the state of Denmark" (Hamlet, Shakespeare).

"By the end of season one, it was like, 'Okay, we can really use music as a way to tell our story,' Music is a character on the show. Music is just one more aspect of storytelling. If I sat down and listened to all of the major montages, I'd probably leave five or six out because we do so many of them." Bob Thiele Jr.

While all songs server their purpose the montage set to a cover of Queen's "Bohemian Rhapsody" stands out for taking chances on a well known song. Bob Thiele Jr. started with a voice and an acoustic guitar but later a question was posed: "What if it's little kids singing it?" Three kids from The Center for Early Education sung a three-part harmony guided by their choral director Ellen who did the arrangement and helped building the haunting montage of the episode "Black Widower" by using a cover which combines rock, blues and traditional country with kids singing (Season 7, Episode 1).

== Discography ==
The Forest Rangers are mostly known for their covers of well known songs and their original songs for the soundtrack of the FX TV series Sons of Anarchy. They have been successful and have continued to release songs as EPs, studio albums, and singles.

"The music, to a larger extent, had to come from a similar place than the characters, that there was an authenticity, a rawness... that you got a sense of authenticity from the characters and the music had to match that. That's why music resonates on so many levels, across age groups. It's something that people can go into and say "Wow, this is authentic." Bob Thiele Jr.

The Forest Rangers released 4 volumes of songs as soundtrack albums (Songs of Anarchy: Music from Sons of Anarchy Seasons 1–4, Sons of Anarchy: Songs of Anarchy Vol. 2, Sons of Anarchy: Songs of Anarchy Vol. 3, Sons of Anarchy: Songs of Anarchy Vol. 4 ), 3 EPs (The first five-song EP, entitled Sons of Anarchy: North Country – EP, was released on September 8, 2009, and featured the full version of the Emmy Award nominated theme song "This Life". A second five-song EP, entitled Sons of Anarchy: Shelter – EP, was released on November 24, 2009, while a third six-song EP, entitled Sons of Anarchy: The King is Gone - EP, was released on November 23, 2010) and numerous singles.

The band released its debut album, Land Ho! (2015) after launching a successful PledgeMusic campaign for its recording. The album is co-produced by Bob Thiele Jr. and producer/engineer Dave Way. Besides the regular band members (Davey Faragher/bass, John Philip Shenale/keyboards, Greg Leisz/pedal steel guitar, Matt Chamberlain/drums, Gia Ciambotti/background vocals), guest vocals included Alison Mosshart, Amos Lee, Joshua James, The White Buffalo, Billy Valentine, Audra Mae and Justin Warfield. The 11 songs on Land Ho! span a range of genres from Americana to bluesy roots rock to epic soulful ballads.

In 2018, The Forest Rangers contributed to the Mayans M.C. soundtrack with the song "Black is Black".

=== Songs from Sons of Anarchy episodes ===
Year	Song	feat. Artist	Sons of Anarchy episode
2008	Theme Song of Sons of Anarchy	Curtis Stigers	All Episodes
2008	Ending Theme Song of Sons of Anarchy	-	All Episodes
2008	"This Life"	Curtis Stigers	SE1E1 Pilot
2008	"Son of a Preacher Man"	Katey Sagal	SE1E2 Seeds
2008	"I'm Eighteen"	-	SE1E5 Giving Back
2008	"Blue Angel"	Billy Valentine	SE1E6 AK-51
2008	"Fortunate Son"	Lyle Workman	SE1E9 Hell Followed
2008	"Forever Young"	Audra Mae	SE1E12 The Sleep of Babies
2008	"John The Revelator"	Curtis Stigers	S1E13 The Revelator
2009	"The Places I Can't Afford To Go"	Bob Neuwirth	S2E10 Balm
2009	"Someday Never Comes"	Billy Valentine	S2E12 The Culling
2009	"Gimme Shelter"	Paul Brady	S2E13 Na Trioblóidí
2009	"No Milk Today"	Joshua James	SE3E1 So
2010	"Into Thy Hands"	-	SE3E2 Oiled
2010	"Bird on the Wire"	Katey Sagal	SE3E4 Home
2010	"Travelin' Band"	Curtis Stigers	SE3E7 Widering Eye
2010	"Miles Away"	Battleme & Slash	SE3E13 NS
2011	"What a Wonderful World"	Alison Mosshart	SE4E1 Out
2011	"John The Revelator"	Curtis Stigers	SE4E1 Out
2011	"Have At It"	-	SE4E1 Out
2011	"Anarquia"	Olmeca	SE4E7 Fruit for the Crows
2011	"Strange Fruit"	Katey Sagal	SE4E7 Fruit for the Crows
2011	"Dreaming of You"	Sarah White	SE4E8 Family Recipe
2011	"Time"	Battleme	SE4E10 Hands
2011	"The House of the Rising Sun"	The White Buffalo	SE4E14 To Be, Act 2
2012	"Higher Ground"	Franky Perez	SE5E1 Sovereign
2012	"The Unclouded Day"	Audra Mae	SE5E5 Orca Shrugged
2012	"The Passenger"	Alison Mosshart	SE5E7 Toad's Wild Ride
2012	"Lights"	Battleme	SE5E9 Andare Pescare
2012	"Blind Ride"	Alison Mosshart	SE5E10 Crucifixed
2012	"To Sir With Love"	Katey Sagal	SE5E13 J' ai Obtenu Cette
2013	"(Sittin' On) The Dock of the Bay"	Billy Valentine	SE6E1 Straw
2013	"As Tears Go By"	Noah Gundersen	SE6E2 One One Six
2013	"Running Blues"	Jennifer O'Connor	SE6E3 Poenitentia
2013	"Everyday People"	Audra Mae, Billy Valentine, Katey Sagal, Curtis Stigers, Franky Perez	SE6E3 Poenitentia
2013	"Sitting on Top of the World"	Chris Goss	SE6E4 Wolfsangel
2013	"John The Revelator"	Curtis Stigers	SE6E6 Salvage
2013	"Love Is My Religion"	Franky Perez	S6E7 Sweet and Vaded
2013	"For a Dancer"	Katey Sagal	SE6E10 Huang Wu
2013	"I See Through You (Free Your Mind)"	Battleme	SE6E11 Aon Rud Persanta
2013	"Day is Gone"	Noah Gundersen	SE6E13 A Mother's Work
2014	"Never My Love"	Billy Valentine	SE7E1 Black Widower
2014	"Bohemian Rhapsody"	The White Buffalo, Billy Valentine, Franky Perez	SE7E1 Black Widower
2014	"Baby, Please Don't Go"	Franky Perez	SE7E2 Toil and Till
2014	"Baby, Please Don't Go"	Franky Perez	SE7E4 Poor Little Lamps
2014	"The Age Of The Aquarius/Let The Sun Shine In"	Joshua James	SE7E5 Some Strange Eruption
2014	"Gotta Love"	Justin Warfield	SE7E6 Smoke 'em if You Got 'em
2014	"Greensleeves"	Katey Sagal	SE7E7 Greensleeves
2014	"All Along the Watchtower"	Gabe Witcher	SE7E8 The Separation of Crows
2014	"All Along the Watchtower"	Billy Valentine	SE7E8 The Separation of Crows
2014	"Boots of Spanish Leather"	Amos Lee	SE7E10 Faith and Despondency
2014	"Trying to Believe You're Mine"	Alison Mosshart	SE7E10 Faith and Despondency
2014	"Blessed Assurance"	-	SE7E11 Suits of Woe
2014	"Greensleeves"	Katey Sagal	SE7E12 Red Rose
2014	"Come Join The Murder"	The White Buffalo	SE7E13 Papa's Goods

=== Albums ===
Year	Album
2011	Songs of Anarchy: Music from Sons of Anarchy Seasons 1–4
2012	Sons of Anarchy: Songs of Anarchy Vol. 2
2013	Sons of Anarchy: Songs of Anarchy Vol. 3
2013	Covered, Katey Sagal
2015	Sons of Anarchy: Songs of Anarchy Vol. 4
2015	Land Ho!

=== EPs ===
Year	EP
2009	Sons of Anarchy: North Country
2009	Sons of Anarchy: Shelter
2010	Sons of Anarchy: The King is Gone

Sons of Anarchy: North Country – EP
No.	Title	Writer(s)	Artist	Length
1.	"This Life"	Curtis Stigers, Dave Kushner, Bob Thiele Jr., Kurt Sutter	Curtis Stigers & The Forest Rangers	2:22
2.	"Slip Kid"	Pete Townshend	Anvil and Franky Perez	3:49
3.	"John the Revelator"	Traditional	Curtis Stigers & The Forest Rangers	5:34
4.	"Forever Young"	Bob Dylan	Audra Mae & The Forest Rangers	3:13
5.	"Girl from the North Country"	Dylan	Lions	4:11

Sons of Anarchy: Shelter – EP
No.	Title	Writer(s)	Artist	Length
1.	"Ruby Tuesday"	Jagger/Richards	Katey Sagal	3:23
2.	"Fortunate Son"	John Fogerty	Lyle Workman & The Forest Rangers	3:26
3.	"Someday Never Comes"	Fogerty	Billy Valentine & The Forest Rangers	4:06
4.	"Burn This Town"	Matt Drenik	Battleme	3:13
5.	"Gimme Shelter"	Jagger/Richards	Paul Brady & The Forest Rangers	4:53

Sons of Anarchy: The King is Gone - EP
No.	Title	Writer(s)	Artist	Length
1.	"No Milk Today"	Graham Gouldman	Joshua James & The Forest Rangers	4:01
2.	"Bird on the Wire"	Leonard Cohen	Katey Sagal & The Forest Rangers	5:05
3.	"Travelin' Band"	Fogerty	Curtis Stigers & The Forest Rangers	2:18
4.	"Miles Away"	Paul Taylor	The Forest Rangers feat. Battleme & Slash	4:49
5.	"Hey Hey, My My"	Neil Young, Jeff Blackburn	Battleme	2:52
6.	"This Life" (Celtic Remix)	Stigers, Kushner, Thiele Jr., Sutter	Curtis Stigers & The Forest Rangers	0:39

=== Singles ===
Year	Single
2008	"Forever Young" - Audra Mae & The Forest Rangers
2009	"The Place I can't Afford to Go" - Bob Neuwirth & The Forest Rangers
2010	"Travelin' Band" - Curtis Stigers & The Forest Rangers
2010	"No Milk Today" - Joshua James & The Forest Rangers
2010	"Shadows and Dreams" - Kim Ferron & The Forest Rangers
2011	"Strange Fruit" - Katey Sagal, The Forest Rangers, Blake Mills
2011	What a Wonderful World - Alison Mosshart & The Forest Rangers
2012	"SOA The Unclouded Day" - Audra Mae & The Forest Rangers
2014	"Come Join the Murder" - The Forest Rangers feat. John Doe
2018	"Christmas Song" - Billy Valentine, Audra Mae & The Forest Rangers
2019	"Black is Black" - Katey Sagal & The Forest Rangers, Mayans M.C.
2020	"Shining Star"

== Music videos ==
- "Trying to Believe" (2015) is from Bob Thiele Jr. and The Forest Rangers' album Land Ho!. It was shot in Los Angeles by director Kenneth Cappelo and features Sons of Anarchy cast members Mark Boone, Jr. (Bobby Munson), Niko Nicotera (Ratboy), Dayton Callie (Wayne Unser), Michael Ornstein (Chucky) alongside Bob Thiele, Jr. and Alison Mosshart.
- "I'm Alive" (2015). Lyric video directed by Shelby Duncan.

== Tours ==
In 2013 The Forest Rangers launched their first music tour with Katey Sagal. The live show featured several of the SOA songs among others and in addition to the musical aspect of the touring show, it included a moderated panel conversation with Sagal (Gemma) and cast members Theo Rossi (Juice) and Ryan Hurst (Opie). The band went on touring in 2014 with only a handful of appearances because of Sons of Anarchy's filming.

The core musicians behind "The Forest Rangers" formed a band named "The Reluctant Apostles" with Katey Sagal as their lead singer.

== Trivia ==
In 2014 the swan song of the series, Come Join The Murder debuted at No. 9 on Billboard's Hot Rock Songs Chart. This Life started at No. 93 on the Billboard Hot 100.

In 2015 The Forest Rangers released "Come Join The Murder" with John Doe. They donated their profit to the Pablove Foundation honoring Childhood Cancer Awareness Month.

In 2015 The SAMCRO Festival was organised in Greece. Greek bands covered songs from Sons of Anarchy playing one after the other for 7 hours.

Bob Thiele Jr.'s father, Bob Thiele co-wrote the song What a Wonderful World; it became a well known song after it appeared on Good Morning Vietnam. The song appeared in Season 4, Episode 1. Out in a montage which showed 10 murder with a cover of the song by The Forest Rangers and Alison Mosshart.
