= Sons of Anarchy: Songs of Anarchy Vol. 3 =

Soundtrack album by Various Artists
- Released: December 3, 2013
- Genre: Rock
- Length: 48:25

Sons of Anarchy: Songs of Anarchy Vol. 3 is a soundtrack album featuring music from the FX television program Sons of Anarchy, and is a follow-up to the 2012 release Sons of Anarchy: Songs of Anarchy Vol. 2 and several earlier EPs from the popular show. The album has sold 23,000 copies in the United States as of February 2015.

The songs are performed by The Forest Rangers, the "house band" of the series led by Bob Thiele Jr. The Forest Rangers serve as the Sons Of Anarchy house band, which includes the show's music composer Bob Thiele Jr, Greg Leisz (guitar/banjo), John Philip Shenale (keyboards), Lyle Workman (guitar), Dave Way (recording Engineer and Sergeant at Arms), Davey Faragher (bass), Brian Macleod (drums) and Velvet Revolver guitarist Dave Kushner.

== Track listing ==
No.	Title	Artist	Length
1.	"Sitting on Top of the World"	Chris Goss & The Forest Rangers	3:28
2.	"Running Blues"	Jennifer O'Connor & The Forest Rangers	2:45
3.	"Come Healing"	Leonard Cohen	2:52
4.	"(Sittin' On) The Dock of the Bay"	Billy Valentine & The Forest Rangers	3:21
5.	"Love is My Religion"	Franky Perez & The Forest Rangers	3:15
6.	"As Tears Go By"	Noah Gundersen & The Forest Rangers	3:50
7.	"I See Through You (Free Your Mind)"	Battleme & The Forest Rangers	3:23
8.	"Day Is Gone"	Noah Gundersen & The Forest Rangers	4:24
9.	"Everyday People"	The Forest Rangers feat. Audra Mae, Billy Valentine, Katey Sagal, Curtis Stigers & Franky Perez	5:29
10.	"For a Dancer"	Katey Sagal & The Forest Rangers	4:40
11.	"Slip Kid"	The Forest Rangers feat. Franky Perez	3:50
12.	"Lullaby for a Soldier (Arms of the Angels)"	Maggie Siff	3:07
13.	"Crash This Train"	Joshua James	4:00

== In popular culture ==
- "Lullaby for a Soldier" was used in the teaser trailer for the 2019 film Alita: Battle Angel, based on the manga Battle Angel Alita by Yukito Kishiro.
