= The Forest Rangers =

The Forest Rangers may refer to:

- The Forest Rangers (TV series), Canadian TV series
- The Forest Rangers (band), band formed to create the soundtrack for TV series Sons of Anarchy
- The Forest Rangers (film), 1942 film starring Fred MacMurray, Paulette Goddard, and Susan Hayward
- Forest Rangers F.C., a Zambian football club

== See also ==
- Park ranger, sometimes called a forest ranger
