= Sons of Anarchy: Songs of Anarchy Vol. 4 =

Soundtrack album
- Released: February 24, 2015
- Genre: Rock
- Length: 56:27

Sons of Anarchy: Songs of Anarchy Vol. 4 is a soundtrack album featuring music from the FX television program Sons of Anarchy, and is a follow-up to the 2013 release Sons of Anarchy: Songs of Anarchy Vol. 3 and several earlier EPs from the popular show.

The songs are performed by The Forest Rangers, the house band of the series led by Bob Thiele Jr. The Forest Rangers serve as the Sons Of Anarchy house band, which includes the show's music composer Bob Thiele Jr, Greg Leisz (guitar/banjo), John Philip Shenale (keyboards), Lyle Workman (guitar), Dave Way (recording Engineer and Sergeant at Arms), Davey Faragher (bass), Brian Macleod (drums) and Velvet Revolver guitarist Dave Kushner.

"Come Join The Murder" performed by The White Buffalo and The Forest Rangers debuted at number 9 on Billboards Hot Rock chart and claimed the 93 spot on the Hot 100 chart.

== Track listing ==
No.	Title	Artist	Length
1.	"Bohemian Rhapsody"	The Forest Rangers feat. The White Buffalo, Billy Valentine & Franky Perez	6:44
2.	"Never My Love"	Audra Mae & The Forest Rangers feat. Billy Valentine	4:26
3.	"The Age of Aquarius/Let The Sun Shine In"	Joshua James & The Forest Rangers feat. Billy Valentine	5:32
4.	"Greensleeves"	Katey Sagal & The Forest Rangers	5:28
5.	"All Along the Watchtower"	Billy Valentine & The Forest Rangers	3:58
6.	"Make It Rain"	Ed Sheeran	6:42
7.	"Baby, Please Don’t Go"	Franky Perez & The Forest Rangers	3:05
8.	"Blue Angel"	Billy Valentine & The Forest Rangers	5:01
9.	"All Along the Watchtower (Instrumental)"	The Forest Rangers feat. Gabe Witcher	2:52
10.	"Can't Help Falling In Love (CD Exclusive)"	Franky Perez & The Forest Rangers	2:14
11.	"Boots of Spanish Leather"	Amos Lee & The Forest Rangers	5:11
12.	"Come Join The Murder"	The White Buffalo & The Forest Rangers	7:28
