= Bob Thiele Jr. =

American songwriter (born 1955)

- Born: Robert Thiele Jr. July 3, 1955 (age 71)
- Occupations: Musician, producer, composer, music supervisor
- Known for: The Office, Sons of Anarchy
- Notable work: The Forest Rangers
- Television: Sons of Anarchy, Mayans M.C.
- Children: Owen Thiele
- Parents: Bob Thiele (father); Jane Harvey (mother)

Bob Thiele Jr. (born July 3, 1955) is an American composer, musician and music producer. He has worked with many musical artists and on several soundtracks for TV shows and films. He is the son of producer Bob Thiele and singer Jane Harvey.

== Career ==
Thiele has worked with many artists, such as Bette Midler and Ray Charles.

He was part of the Royal Macadamians ensemble, collaborating with Davitt Sigerson and John Philip Shenale, also known as Phil Shenale. They released the Experiments in Terror album in 1990.

== Television ==
Thiele has worked for the music department of many TV series.

| Year | Title | Role |
|---|---|---|
| 2000-2004 | Boston Public | music producer |
| 2003-2007 | The O.C. | music producer |
| 2005-2006 | The Buzz on Maggie | main theme composer |
| 2005 | Three Wishes | main theme composer |
| 2005-2013 | The Office | theme, musician, creator of the band The Scrantones |
| 2006 | Bernard and Doris | composer, original songs and additional music |
| 2008-2014 | Sons of Anarchy | main title composer (This Life), music supervisor, seven seasons |
| 2010-2011 | Detroit 1-8-7 | music supervisor |
| 2012 | Alcatraz | music supervisor |
| 2013-2014 | Lucky 7 | |
| 2014-2016 | Manhattan | music supervisor |
| 2015 | Sin City Saints | music supervisor |
| 2015 | The Bastard Executioner | |
| 2016-2017 | Chance | music supervisor |
| 2017-2021 | Genius | music supervisor |
| 2017-2018 | Superior Donuts | theme music composer |
| 2018-2023 | Mayans M.C. | music supervisor, main title composer |

Thiele led and founded Sons of Anarchy's house band The Forest Rangers. Greg Leisz (guitar/banjo), John Philip Shenale (keyboards), Lyle Workman (guitar), Dave Way (recording Engineer and Sergeant at Arms), Davey Faragher (bass), Brian Macleod (drums) and Velvet Revolver guitarist Dave Kushner. The band released three EPs: Sons of Anarchy: North Country (2009), Sons of Anarchy: Shelter and Sons of Anarchy: The King Is Gone. Four soundtrack albums followed along with numerous singles: Songs of Anarchy: Music from Sons of Anarchy Seasons 1-4, Sons of Anarchy: Songs of Anarchy Vol.2, Sons of Anarchy: Songs of Anarchy Vol.3, Sons of Anarchy: Songs of Anarchy Vol. 4. The band also created an album titled Land Ho! in 2015, which was funded by a PledgeMusic campaign for its recording and release.

Thiele's songs from Mayans M.C. were released as albums and singles such as Señor [From "Mayans M.C."] (2020, producer), En Mi Camino [From "Mayans M.C."] (2020, composer, producer), Black Is Black [From "Mayans M.C."] (2020, producer), I Say a Little Prayer (Rezo una Oración por Ti) [From "Mayans M.C."] (2020, producer).

== Film ==
Thiele has worked for motion pictures such as: The Five Heartbeats (1991, songwriter, Robert Townsend/Director), I Still Know What You Did Last Summer (1998, songwriter, Danny Cannon/Director), The Waiting Game (1999, songwriter, Ken Liotti/Director), Boys and Girls (2000, songwriter, Robert Iscove/Director), Out of Line (2001, songwriter, Johanna Demetrakas/Director), Bernard and Doris (2006, additional music, songwriter, Bob Balaban/Director), Bad Country (2014, songwriter, Chris Brinker/Director), There's Always Woodstock (2014, music supervisor, Rita Merson/Director), Bad Hurt (2015, music supervisor, songwriter, Mark Kemble/Director), A Boyfriend For My Wife (2016, songwriter, Julia Rezende/Director).

== Awards and nominations ==
Thiele was nominated once for a daytime Emmy Award and 3 times for a Prime Time Emmy Award. He has won the Hollywood Music in Media Award twice and an ASCAP Film and Television Music award three times.

In 2009, Thiele was nominated for a Primetime Emmy Award for his work on Sons of Anarchy. The song "This Life", written by him, guitarist Dave Kushner, Curtis Stigers and show creator Kurt Sutter, was nominated at the category "Outstanding Original Main Title Theme Music" while it was performed by Curtis Stigers and The Forest Rangers. Thiele was nominated for an OFTA television award for "This Life" at Best New Theme Song in a Series, Motion Picture or Miniseries category.

In 2014, he was nominated again for a Primetime Emmy Award for Outstanding Original Music and Lyrics for his song "Day is Gone", which was on the soundtrack of the Sons of Anarchy episode "A Mother's Work" (Season 6, Episode 13). Noah Gundersen and Kurt Sutter co-wrote the song which was performed by Noah Gundersen and The Forest Rangers.

In 2015, Thiele was nominated for a third time for a Primetime Emmy Award for his song "Come Join the Murder" from the Sons of Anarchy episode "Papa's Goods" (Season 7, episode 13). Jake Smith and Kurt Sutter co-wrote the song which was performed by The White Buffalo and The Forest Rangers.

| Year | Award | Category | Nominated work | Result |
|---|---|---|---|---|
| 2006 | Daytime Emmy Award | Outstanding Original Song | "Just the Way I Am" | Nominated |
| 2009 | Primetime Emmy Award | Outstanding Original Main Title Theme Music: "This Life" | Sons of Anarchy | Nominated |
| 2009 | OFTA Television Award | Best New Theme Song in a Series, Motion Picture or Miniseries | Sons of Anarchy | Nominated |
| 2011 | Hollywood Music in Media Awards (HMMA) | Best Music Supervision | Sons of Anarchy | Won |
| 2013 | ASCAP Film and Television Music Award | Top Television Series | Sons of Anarchy | Won |
| 2014 | Primetime Emmy Award | Outstanding Original Music and Lyrics for Song: "Day is Gone", Episode: "A Mother's Work" | Sons of Anarchy | Nominated |
| 2014 | Hollywood Music in Media Awards (HMMA) | Best Music Supervision - Television | Sons of Anarchy | Won |
| 2014 | OFTA Television Award | Best Music in a Series | Sons of Anarchy | Nominated |
| 2015 | Primetime Emmy Award | Outstanding Music and Lyrics for Song "Come Join the Murder". Episode: "Papa's Goods" | Sons of Anarchy | Nominated |
| 2019 | ASCAP Screen Music Awards | Top Television - Network | Superior Donuts | Won |
| 2019 | ASCAP Screen Music Awards | Top Television - Cable | Mayans M.C. | Won |
