= Widow's Walk =

A widow's walk is a railed rooftop platform on a house.

Widow's walk may also refer to:

- Widow's Walk, a 1984 novel by Andrew Coburn
- Widow's Walk (novel), a 2002 novel by Robert B. Parker
- Widow's Walk (1987 film), directed by Pierre Granier-Deferre
- Widow's Walk (2017 film), directed by Alexandra Boyd
- "Widow's Walk", a song by Suzanne Vega from her 2001 album Songs in Red and Gray
- Widow's Walk, a 2016 expansion for the board game Betrayal at House on the Hill

== See also ==
- On the Widow's Walk, a 2020 album by The White Buffalo
