= Sons of Anarchy: Songs of Anarchy Vol. 2 =

Soundtrack album by Various Artists
- Released: November 19, 2012
- Genre: Rock
- Length: 50:16
- Label: Columbia

Sons of Anarchy: Songs of Anarchy Vol. 2 is a soundtrack album featuring music from the FX television program Sons of Anarchy, and is a follow-up to the 2011 release Songs of Anarchy: Music from Sons of Anarchy Seasons 1–4 and several earlier EPs from the popular show. Songs include covers of "Sympathy for the Devil," "Higher Ground," and "Travelin' Band," as well as several original tracks. Performers include Jane's Addiction, with most tracks performed by longtime SOA contributors The Forest Rangers.

The Forest Rangers serve as the Sons Of Anarchy house band, which includes the show's music composer Bob Thiele Jr, Greg Leisz (guitar/banjo), John Philip Shenale (keyboards), Lyle Workman (guitar), Dave Way (recording Engineer and Sergeant at Arms), Davey Faragher (bass), Brian Macleod (drums) and Velvet Revolver guitarist Dave Kushner.

== Track listing ==
No.	Title	Writer(s)	Artist	Length
1.	"Sympathy for the Devil"	Mick Jagger, Keith Richards	Jane's Addiction	5:27
2.	"The Lost Boy"	Greg Holden	Greg Holden	3:26
3.	"The Passenger"	Ricky Gardiner, Iggy Pop	Alison Mosshart and the Forest Rangers	4:41
4.	"He Got Away"	Bob Thiele Jr., Kurt Sutter	Noah Gundersen and the Forest Rangers	3:30
5.	"To Sir With Love"	Don Black, Mark London	Katey Sagal and the Forest Rangers	3:21
6.	"Higher Ground"	Stevie Wonder	Franky Perez and the Forest Rangers	3:54
7.	"Lights"	Matt Drenik, Bob Thiele Jr.	Battleme and the Forest Rangers	3:45
8.	"The Unclouded Day"	Bob Thiele Jr.	Audra Mae and the Forest Rangers	4:11
9.	"Coal War"	Joshua James	Joshua James	5:13
10.	"Time"	Matt Drenik, Bob Thiele Jr.	Battleme and the Forest Rangers	2:36
11.	"Travelin' Band"	John Fogerty	Curtis Stigers and the Forest Rangers	2:17
12.	"Family"	Abby Gundersen, Noah Gundersen	Noah Gundersen	3:33
13.	"No Milk Today"	Graham Gouldman	Joshua James and the Forest Rangers	4:23

== Personnel ==
The album's credits and personnel can be obtained from Allmusic.

The Forest Rangers

- Bob Thiele Jr. — guitar, acoustic guitar, bass, piano, organ, keyboard, synthesizer, vocal harmonies
- Greg Leisz — guitar, banjo, lap steel guitar, mandolin
- John Philip Shenale — organ, piano, Mexican harp
- Lyle Workman — vocals, guitar
- Dave Kushner — guitar, bass
- Davey Faragher — bass
- Brian Macleod — drums, hand drums

Additional musicians

- Katey Sagal — vocals, backing vocals
- Curtis Stigers — vocals
- Audra Mae — vocals
- Franky Perez — vocals
- Paul Brady — vocals
- Alison Mosshart — vocals

Production personnel

- Bob Thiele Jr. — producer, arranger
- Kurt Sutter — producer, arranger
- Dave Kushner — producer
- Matt Hyde — producer, engineer, mixer
- Matt Drenik — producer, engineer, mixer
- Jason Buntz — engineer
- Brian Scheuble — engineer, mixer
- Dave Way — engineer, mixer
- Ed Cherney — mixer
- Dave Warren — cover art, design
