= This Life (Sons of Anarchy song) =

Song by Curtis Stigers & The Forest Rangers

from the EP Sons of Anarchy: North Country
- Released: September 1, 2008
- Recorded: 2008
- Studio: Cunningham Audio Production, Boise, Idaho
- Genre: Southern rock, blues-rock
- Length: 2:22
- Songwriter(s): Curtis Stigers; Dave Kushner; Bob Thiele Jr.; Kurt Sutter

"This Life" is the theme song for the FX television series Sons of Anarchy, written by singer-songwriter Curtis Stigers, Velvet Revolver guitarist Dave Kushner, record producer Bob Thiele Jr. and show creator Kurt Sutter while it was performed by Curtis Stigers & The Forest Rangers.

== Background ==
Musician Dave Kushner, of Velvet Revolver, began collaborating with friend and producer Bob Thiele Jr. on the main theme song and end credit theme for the FX television series Sons of Anarchy. Kushner originally wrote the riff with Shooter Jennings in mind before using it for the theme. Thiele then contacted Curtis Stigers to write lyrics and sing the theme, who recorded the song at Cunningham Audio Production in Boise, Idaho. Show creator Kurt Sutter also cowrote the lyrics to the song. When speaking about why he cowrote the theme for the show, Kushner stated that:

I was drawn to the show for two reasons [...] 'Sons' is an incredibly intense, gnarly drama about family and the things we do for love and money when we're not presented the same opportunity others are. Also, it was a chance for me to work with my good friend Bob [Thiele] who is an amazing songwriter/producer/musician.

An Irish-themed version of the song was used for several episodes in season 3 (those in which SAMCRO members were present in Belfast, Northern Ireland).

== Awards and nominations ==
"This Life" received an Emmy Award nomination for Outstanding Main Title Theme Music in 2009, but lost out to the theme for the PBS television series Great Performances. Commenting on the nomination, Kushner stated that he was "honored to be recognized by and to receive this nomination from the Academy of Television Arts & Sciences." The following year, they received an ASCAP Award for the theme.

== Release ==
The song was released in September 2008 on the Sons of Anarchy: North Country – EP, which featured music from the television show by Anvil, Franky Perez and Audra Mae, via iTunes. It is also available in the album Songs of Anarchy: Music from Sons of Anarchy Seasons 1–4. A new version of the song was introduced in Season 6.

== See also ==
- Sons of Anarchy Music
- List of Winners and Nominees for Outstanding Main Title Theme Music
