= The White Buffalo (musician) =

American singer-songwriter

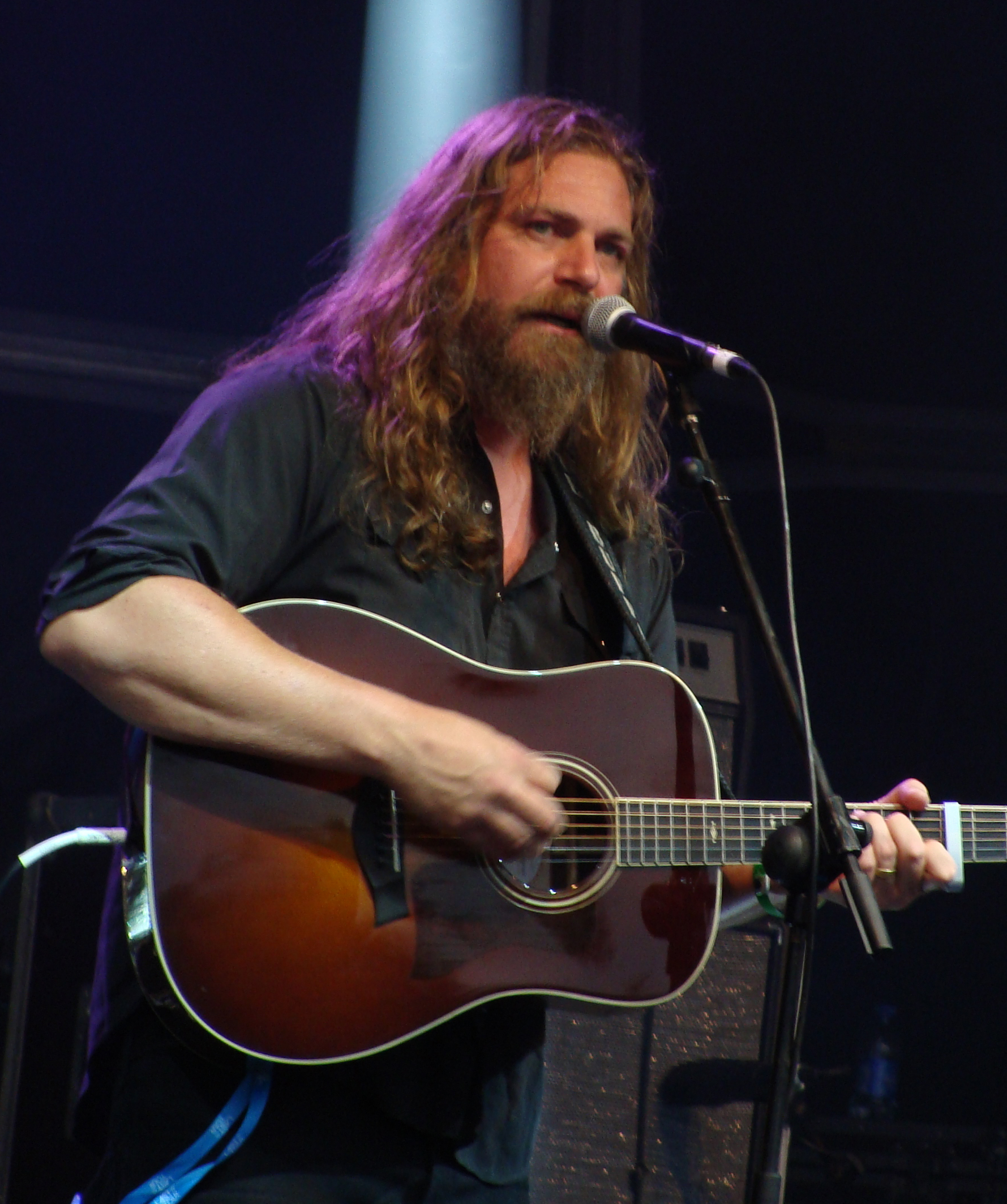
- Jake Smith at the 2015 Azkena Rock Festival in Vitoria-Gasteiz

Background information
- Born: Eugene, Oregon, U.S
- Origin: Los Angeles, California, U.S
- Genres: Alternative country; country; roots rock; folk; cowpunk; blues

The White Buffalo is the stage name of American musician and singer-songwriter Jake Smith, a baritone from Oregon influenced by folk musicians like Bob Dylan and Leonard Cohen. Smith's songs, from an array of at least ten extended plays and studio albums released since 2002, have provided songs for a variety of popular American media, including the television series Sons of Anarchy, Californication, The Punisher, Longmire, This Is Us, as well as the surfing movie Shelter, and the Marvel movie Logan.

== Style and influences ==
Smith is a baritone, and is known for a wide range in pitch within his singing, and for incorporating whistling into his music, i.e., in place of the harmonica often used in roots music, as well as for his references to God and war in his lyrics. His singing style has been compared to that of the late singer-songwriter Richie Havens. He is a singer/songwriter of compelling melody and intricate lyrics, straddling blurry lines of country, rock, folk and Americana along the way.

Smith grew up listening to country music and punk rock. His storytelling has been compared to that of folk musicians such as Townes Van Zandt and Steve Earle.

== Career ==
The White Buffalo's first full-length album, Hogtied Like a Rodeo, debuted in 2002. This was followed by The White Buffalo EP, produced by Eels' Koool G Murder, which Smith states is about "relationships, love, loss and booze with a little murder mixed in." This EP was musically grounded in acoustic folk and country blues. He re-recorded the first album in a friend's living room in 2008, renaming it Hogtied Revisited, in a blend of elements of folk, modern rock, and alternative country.

In 2010, a second EP, again musically grounded in folk, Prepare for Black and Blue, was recorded in six days with producer Jimmy Messer, and released through Chad Stokes' Ruffshod imprint via Nettwerk Records. The music and the artist captured the attention of Unison Music's Bruce Witkin and Ryan Dorn, who then signed The White Buffalo and co-produced Once Upon a Time in the West, an album that transitioned to a more roots rock sound, with some songs still retaining a folk style.

In 2013, a fourth LP, a mix of folk and some blues rock, Shadows, Greys, and Evil Ways, was released on Unison Music Group to positive reviews. NY1 stated, "Not since Neil Young's Living with War has there been so strong an artistic statement about this country's occupations."

The musically varied album, Love and the Death of Damnation, was released in 2015. In it, several songs being grounded in roots rock, while the song "Chico" incorporated Latin music, "Last Call to Heaven" fused folk, blues and jazz, and "Come On Love, Come On In" was a soul song.

In August 2017 Smith released two tracks from his then-upcoming album Darkest Darks, Lightest Lights, the singles "Avalon" and "The Observatory", the latter a blend of soft-rock and country-folk, the former, which tells the story of a wayward man's search for peace, being described by Billboard as an "expansive country-tinged rock song." Darkest Darks, Lightest Lights, a blend of alternative rock, blues, country and folk, was released in October 2017 to positive reviews, and was Smith's most electrified rock album yet.

=== In popular media ===
After a bootleg tape of Smith's music made it into the hands of professional surfer Chris Malloy, one of his songs, "Wrong," was featured in Malloy's surf movie, Shelter. This eventually led to further film scoring and composing work, with many of his songs featured in FX's hit show Sons of Anarchy, Showtime's Californication, as well as commercials for Wal-Mart.

Several of his songs have been featured in Sons of Anarchy. Most notably, in 2014, he and The Forest Rangers performed the Season 7 finale song, "Come Join the Murder", written by the show's creator, Kurt Sutter. The song debuted at number 9 on Billboard's Hot Rock Chart and claimed the 93 spot on the Hot 100 chart. The "House of the Rising Sun", performed with The Forest Rangers, was featured in the fourth season of Sons of Anarchy. The White Buffalo's Digital EP, Lost and Found, featuring "Wish It Was True", was used in the third season of Sons of Anarchy. "Bohemian Rhapsody" and "Come Join the Murder" were included in Sons of Anarchy: Songs of Anarchy Vol. 4 album.

The song "The Observatory" from Darkest Darks, Lightest Lights (2017) was featured in This Is Us episode "The 5th Wheel". Smith's song "Where Dirt and Water Collide" was featured in the Netflix series Longmire, in the seventh episode of season six.

His song “Wish It Was True” was also featured in the Netflix original series Marvel's The Punisher, in episode three, "Kandahar", of the first season. And song "The Woods", in episode eight "My Brother’s Keeper", in season two.

The White Buffalo's music has featured in movies, TV shows and video games.

=== Touring ===
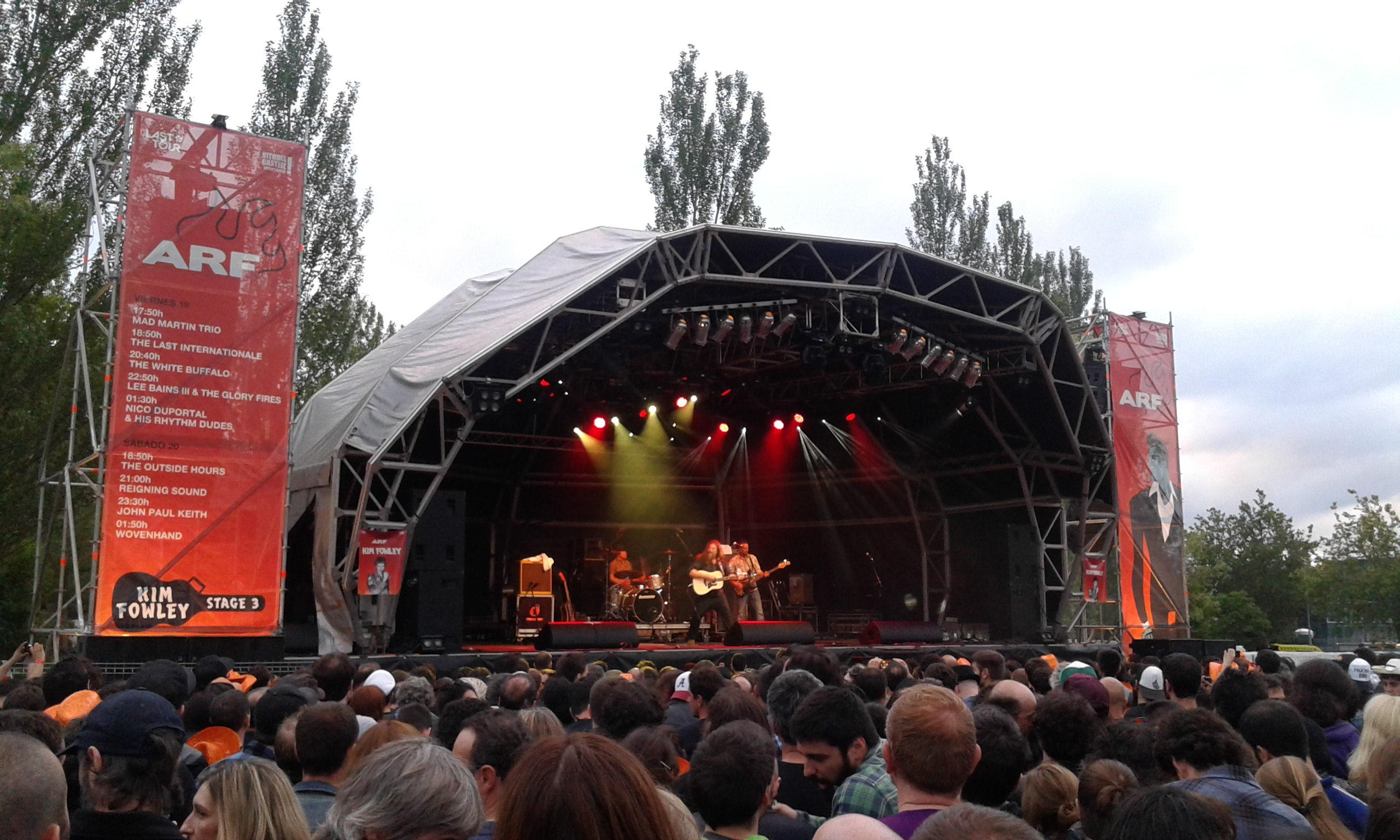
The White Buffalo performing in 2015 (Azkena Rock Festival, Vitoria-Gasteiz).

Smith was a San Francisco waiter who dragged his guitar to open mic nights once or twice a year. When he was asked in 2002 to allow a song in surfer Chris Malloy's movie Shelter, he quit his job and moved down to Orange County. He toured relentlessly, sometimes driving 1,000 miles between gigs.

Over the past few years White Buffalo has played shows both nationally and internationally with acts like Ryan Bingham, Donavan Frankenreiter, Gomez, Xavier Rudd, State Radio, Jack Johnson, Ziggy Marley, and Grace Potter and the Nocturnals, among many others.

=== Capturing The White Buffalo docuseries ===
In June 2015, Ernie Ball Inc. introduced a ten-part docuseries entitled Ernie Ball presents Capturing The White Buffalo: The Recording of an American Songwriter, A ten part docuseries, which followed Smith as he recorded his album, Love and the Death of Damnation. The series sought to show the audience Smith's process "from inspiration, to writing, fine-tuning, recording, and mixing, to rehearsing and performing live", so they could "experience the trials and tribulations of a modern day troubadour". Initially releasing the teaser trailer on May 18, 2015, the first episode premiered June 19, 2015, with each subsequent episode scheduled to release once per week each Friday leading up to the album's release on August 21, 2015.

Date	Episode	Theme
19 June 2015	Episode 1: Inspiration	Jake introduces his band and producers and discusses the inspiration behind his lyrics, his songwriting process and more.
26 June 2015	Episode 2: Writing	Jake focuses on the relationship between writing music and personal life.
3 July 2015	Episode 3: Fine Tuning	Jake discusses transforming a raw idea into a finished product and how to solidify an arrangement for recording. He also discusses the importance of the musicians relationship with his band as well as the people in his life.
13 July 2015	Episode 4: Recording	Jake discusses the hard work and long hours that go into recording an album.
17 July 2015	Episode 5: Vocals	Jake focuses on finalizing vocals for the album.
24 July 2015	Episode 6: Trials & Tribulations	Jake focuses on the trials and tribulations of recording an album.
31 July 2015	Episode 7: Leisure Time	Jake shows that even though the songs can be dark, he and the band definitely have a good time.
9 August 2015	Episode 8: Blue Collar Band	Jake discusses work-life balance, touring and what it takes to make it in today's music industry as a working band.
14 August 2015	Episode 9: Performing Live	Jake discusses playing live.
21 August 2015	Episode 10: Conclusion	A recap of Jake finding inspiration in his garage, to working in the studio, to taking a new song on stage for the first time. Jake's final words on the new album as well as a climactic look into what The White Buffalo is all about.

== Notable appearances ==
The White Buffalo performed at the 2011 Bonnaroo Festival and performed on The Living Room Sessions in December 2011. In August 2014, The White Buffalo performed the songs "This Year" and "The Whistler" on Jimmy Kimmel.

== Awards and recognition ==
The White Buffalo was named as one of twelve artists to watch in NPR's 2012 Winter Music Preview.

His digital extended play, Lost And Found, featuring "Wish It Was True", was named Billboard Folk Chart "Hot Shot Debut".

Year	Award	Category	Nominated work	Result
2015	Primetime Emmy Award	Outstanding Music and Lyrics for Song "Come Join the Murder".season 7, Episode 13: "Papa's Goods"	Sons of Anarchy	Nominated
2015	16th Annual LA Music Awards	Independent Male Singer/Songwriter of the Year	Shadows, Greys & Evil Ways	Nominated

== Discography ==
=== Studio albums ===
- Hogtied Like a Rodeo (independently released, 2002)
- Hogtied Revisited (independently released, 2008)
- Once Upon a Time in the West (Unison Music Group, 2012)
- Shadows, Greys, and Evil Ways (Unison Music Group, 2013)
- Love & The Death of Damnation (Unison Music Group, 2015)
- Darkest Darks, Lightest Lights (Thirty Tigers, 2017)
- On the Widow's Walk (Snakefarm Records, 2020)
- Year of the Dark Horse (Snakefarm Records, 2022)

=== Extended plays ===
- The White Buffalo (independently released, 2002)
- Prepare for Black and Blue (Ruffshod/Nettwerk Records, 2010)
- Lost and Found (Unison Music Group, 2011)

== Tracks of interest ==
- "Wish It Was True" (Lost And Found, 2011).

=== Soundtracks ===
- Safe Haven (Relativity Music, 2013)
- The Lone Ranger: Wanted (Walt Disney Records, 2013)
- West of Memphis (Legacy Recordings, 2014)
- I Know You (Halo Wars 2 - E3 trailer, 2016)

=== Music videos ===
- Love Song #1 (2005)
- Insane (2011)
- Wish It Were True (2012)
- BB Guns And Dirt Bikes (2012)
- How The West Was Won (2012)
- Don't You Want It (2013)
- The Getaway (2013)
- Modern Times (2015)
- I Got You (2016)
- Avalon (2017)
