= Lions (band) =

American rock band

- Lions / Volume 1

Background information
- Origin: Austin, Texas, United States
- Genres: Hard rock, psychedelic rock, heavy metal
- Years active: 2005–2010
- Labels: Maybe
- Members: Matt Drenik; Austin Kalman; Jake Perlman; Mike Sellman
- Past members: Trevor Sutcliffe

Lions (stylized as LIONS) were an American rock band from Austin, Texas, formed in 2005. The lineup consists of singer Matt Drenik, guitarist Austin Kalman and drummer Jake Perlman. Trevor Sutcliffe was Lions' bassist from their formation until his departure in 2009, where he was replaced by Mike Sellman. The band formed following the breakup of The Good Looks, the previous band of both Drenik and Perlman.

As of 2025 MySpace lists one LIONS studio album, No Generation (2007), and two EPs, Volume One (2006), and Let No One Fall (2009). Since 2007, their music has been licensed for television shows (Sons of Anarchy and Californication) as well as video games (Guitar Hero III: Legends of Rock and WWE SmackDown vs. Raw 2010). The inclusion of "Metal Heavy Lady" in Guitar Hero III led to over 3,000 downloads of the song according to Nielsen SoundScan.

== History ==
=== Formation and Volume One EP (2005–2007) ===
Matt Drenik and Jake Perlman were both members of the Austin-based rock band The Good Looks. When they later broke up in the middle of a summer tour, Drenik was told by a club owner that he would keep a Fu Manchu support slot if he formed another band. After renting out an open space above a bar, to write and practice, Drenik and Perlman began working with guitarist Austin Kalman and bassist Trevor Sutcliffe whose bands had also broken up. They quickly formed a new group and, following a suggestion from Perlman, named themselves Lions, due to a large lion head that covered a whole wall of open space where they practiced. Lions went on to fulfill the support slots of The Good Looks while their later shows gained the band some notoriety for their high-energy performances.

To coincide with their appearance at SXSW '06, Lions recorded and released their debut EP Volume One in 2006. Reviewing the EP for Allmusic, Eduardo Rivadavia states that Lions "boldly attempts to straddle the hard rock decades" making comparisons to the bands ZZ Top, Queens of the Stone Age, Nebula and Fu Manchu. He goes on to state that while "there's definite room for improvement" the EP "is a very promising first step [for the band]."

=== No Generation (2007–2009) ===
The band soon gained record label attention from Rock Ridge Music and Roadrunner Records. Though Roadrunner helped to fund the recording of their debut album, they decided against signing the band. The band performed at SXSW '07, which led to the song "Metal Heavy Lady," from the Volume One EP, being licensed for use on the Activision game Guitar Hero III: Legends of Rock in 2007. The song's inclusion on the game led to over 3,000 downloads according to Nielsen SoundScan. The band were also contacted by FX to write the theme song for Sons of Anarchy, recording it with producer Matt Hyde. Though "This Life" was chosen as the theme, Lions music was still used prominently in the show while they would later record a cover of the Bob Dylan song "Girl from the North Country" for the Sons of Anarchy: North Country - EP released in 2009. The band's music was also licensed for use on the Showtime series Californication.

When you put us next to Ozzy on a video game like that ... it makes our song become iconic in the little kid's mind. When people ask what kind of music do we play I say, "Well, we're in a hard rock band, but we are riff rock." Then, if they are still confused, I say, "Well, we were in Guitar Hero." Instantly, they understand exactly what is happening.

—Drenik on the bands inclusion on Guitar Hero III: Legends of Rock

Lions debut album No Generation was released independently on November 14, 2007, with "Start Movin'" chosen as the first single. The album received generally positive reviews upon release. Allmusic reviewer Eduardo Rivadavia states that while there are many positives on the album, "No Generation unfortunately lacks some of its predecessors' excitement and urgency, leaving listeners already aware of the band's potential hungering for more." Reviewing the album for The Austin Chronicle, Austin Powell states that the album "offers tighter production, heavier hooks, and the grooves" though he describes the end of the album as "a draining experience." Jordan Richardson of Blogcritics made comparisons to Soundgarden and Fu Manchu, stating that Lions "have come up with a heavy, bluesy, ultimately rewarding record." In 2008, the band toured in support of the album, playing shows in the US supporting the Toadies and Local H, while "Start Movin'" was re-released to capitalize on the band's exposure from Guitar Hero III The same year, the band gained some interest from Columbia Records, though no deal went through.

=== Let No One Fall EP and recent events (2009–present) ===
In 2009, WWE used "Start Movin'" in promotional spots for SummerSlam 2009 and later included the song in the WWE SmackDown vs. Raw 2010 in-game soundtrack. The band began working on new songs after deciding against using previous material. The band entered pre-production of their new album in May and began recording in June with producer Chris "Frenchie" Smith. It was during this time that bassist Sutcliffe departed the band and was replaced my Mike Sellman for recording. Lions invited Scott Lucas of Local H to write with them, eventually writing the song "Screaming Out," while they were sent a demo from Vaden Todd Lewis, of the Toadies, that they reworked into "Poster Child."

The resulting EP, entitled Let No One Fall, was released on November 23, 2009, in the UK through Maybe Records. The EP received generally positive reviews. Reviewing the EP for Rock Sound, Tim Newbound stated that it was "a wicked slab of bare-bones rock." Malcolm Dowe of Metal Hammer states that they "prove that grunge can be given a fresh twist, bringing in daubs of Velvet Revolver and [Queens of the Stone Age]." Lions later supported Monster Magnet and Karma to Burn on their UK tour in December, making Let No One Fall available for free download to coincide with the tour. Drenik also launched his side project Battleme, contributing the song "Burn This Town" to the second series finale of Sons of Anarchy as well as the series soundtrack Sons of Anarchy: Shelter - EP. He would later, in 2010, contribute a cover of Neil Young's "Hey Hey, My My" for the Sons of Anarchy third series finale and soundtrack Sons of Anarchy: The King is Gone. In 2010, Lions performed at SXSW '10, and later performed one show in Austin, Texas in October, with Drenik focusing on his side project Battleme stating "I'm guessing we'll do a lot of back-and-forth [between bands]." Lions subsequently became inactive as Drenik shifted focus to Battleme.

== Musical style and influences ==
In an interview with Spinner, Matt Drenik described the band's sound as "heavy riff-rock" that was "more in the hard rock vein than in the metal vein." Guitarist Austin Kalman described Lions sound, in Total Guitar, as "the halfway point between straight rock 'n' roll and punk and metal." Jason Bennett, if Nashville Scene, describes that band's music as "a ferocious blend of fuzz, sweat and riffs, with a slinky Southern groove holding it all together." In an article for Billboard magazine, Katie Hasty states that Lions "[combine] '70s hard rock and psych elements ... with buzzing, stoner guitar rifts and Drenik's strong wail." Houston Press writer Christopher Henderson states that "Lions are the Eagles of death metal, had they spent an entire adolescent summer with Black Flag's "In My Head," or Wolfmother for people who drink domestic beer." Eric Allen of Real Detroit Weekly has described the band's sound as "a heavy blend of metal, psychedelic and hard rock that would make the former torchbearers of the genre happy."

Drenik has cited influences from Led Zeppelin and Black Sabbath, while guitarist Kalman cites Sonic Youth, Elliott Smith, The Beatles and avant-garde jazz music as influences on his playing. The band have also seen their music compared to Queens of the Stone Age, ZZ Top, Soundgarden, AC/DC, Nebula and Fu Manchu among others.

== Band members ==
Final Lineup

- Matt Drenik – lead vocals, guitar (2005–2010)
- Austin Kalman – lead guitar, backing vocals (2005–2010)
- Mike Sellman – bass, backing vocals (2009–2010)
- Jake Perlman – drums (2005–2010)

Former members

- Trevor Sutcliffe – bass (2005–2009)

== Discography ==
Studio albums

- No Generation (2007)

Track listing (with duration in minutes):

- 1 Start Movin' (3:41)
- 2 No Generation (3:12)
- 3 Can You Hear Me (3:30)
- 4 White Angel (3:51)
- 5 Evil Eye (3:48)
- 6 Machine (3:06)
- 7 All Hail (3:33)
- 8 She Gets Around (3:40)
- 9 Witch and the Star (4:11)
- 10 Get Out Alive (6:49)

EPs

- Volume One (2006)
- 1 Metal Heavy Lady (2:43)
- 2 Guns (4:45)
- 3 Underground (4:04)
- 4 Movement (5:25)
- 5 Systems Down (4:16)
- 6 Come Around (3:21)
- 7 City Beats (5:41)
- Let No One Fall (2009)
- 1 Gimmie Riot (3:31)
- 2 Blow Away (3:49)
- 3 Poster Child (3:48)
- 4 In Your Head (3:08)
- 5 Screaming Out (4:08)
- 6 Big Bad (2:52)
