= Billy Valentine =

- Born: William A. Valentine; December 16, 1925 (age 100); Birmingham, Alabama, U.S.
- Genres: Blues; R&B; jazz
- Occupation: Musician
- Instrument: Piano

William A. Valentine (born December 16, 1925), also known as Billy Valentine and Billy Vee, is an American blues, R&B and jazz pianist and singer.

Valentine was born in Birmingham, Alabama on December 16, 1925. In 1948, Valentine replaced Charles Brown in Johnny Moore's Three Blazers, then featuring jazz guitarist Oscar Moore. In 1950 that line-up did a couple of recording sessions for RCA Victor before embarking on a 50-date tour. The "R & B Blue Notes" section of the May 27, 1950 issue of The Billboard, in announcing the tour, stated that Valentine had also recorded for Mercury Records (Mercury 8173). The note added that the Blazers would be joined by Hal "Cornbread" Singer for part of the tour. The same line-up accompanied Mari Jones, Maxwell Davies (probably) and the former Nat King Cole Trio bassist Johnny Miller for a recording session in Los Angeles in 1952.

In 1956, as Billy Vee, he recorded for King Records.

In 1958, Valentine appeared as pianist on a February 1958 New York recording session with Bubber Johnson, Eric Dixon, Charles Jackson, Skeeter Best, Ruth Berman, Wendell Marshall and Panama Francis, accompanied by a choir.

== Coltrane ==
Jazz saxophonist Big Nick Nicholas mentioned to jazz archivist Phil Schaap a 1949/1950 New York recording session at which Valentine led a group featuring John Coltrane. Other musicians at session were possibly John Collins or Floyd Smith on guitar, possibly Ray Brown on bass and possibly Charles "Specs" Wright on drums.
