= On the Widow's Walk =

Studio album by The White Buffalo
- Released: April 17, 2020
- Genre: Americana
- Length: 42:28
- Label: Snakefarm Records
- Producer: Shooter Jennings

The White Buffalo chronology
Darkest Darks, Lightest Lights (2017)	On the Widow's Walk (2020)

On the Widow's Walk is a 2020 album written and performed by Americana singer-songwriter the White Buffalo, and produced by Shooter Jennings. It was the first album released on Snakefarm Records.

== Background ==
On the Widow's Walk is the seventh album by Oregon-born Americana artist the White Buffalo, and a follow-up to his 2017 album Darkest Darks, Lightest Lights. On February 20, 2020, the single "The Rapture" was released, and the album's release date was announced. Initially, the album's release was planned to coincide with a tour of the United Kingdom, but, due to the COVID-19 pandemic, the concert was instead live-streamed on April 5, 2020, with the physical concert delayed first to 2021, and then to 2022.

== Recording ==
After Darkest Darks, Lightest Lights, the White Buffalo claimed he was in a "dark place", and struggled to produce any new material, but after meeting Shooter Jennings, he was able to write the bulk of the album within a week and a half.

I was in a weird place, I was in one of those places where I hadn't been doing shit for a while, and one of those darker places that I go to sometimes, where I'm asking all the big questions. What's my purpose? What's fucking life worth? What's the point? And [Jennings] helped me get out of that.

— The White Buffalo

The recording on On the Widow's Walk was conducted in a live setting, with few retakes, a style which the White Buffalo lamented not having adopted earlier.

== Themes ==
The title of On the Widow's Walk is derived from the widow's walk, platforms placed on coastal homes, used for lookouts at sea, from which women would wait for their husbands to return from sea. Traveling along the East Coast of the United States and seeing widow's walks gave the White Buffalo the idea to make a concept album about water, and the way it can be connected to sorrow and destruction. The idea of a concept album was abandoned, as he did not want to forego songs just because they did not fit the theme. However, the initial motif of water remained, and was placed alongside other ideas, such as technology and the loss of morality. On the Widow's Walk was inspired by Desire, the White Buffalo's favorite album.

=== "Problem Solution" ===
The White Buffalo described "Problem Solution" as a "song in two parts about mental states", saying "the first half, 'Problem', is about heartbreak and self-doubt when things are bleak and hopeless. The abrupt release and uplift into the second movement, 'Solution', is the answer, about living in the moment and getting through the day." Rolling Stone called it a "majestic yin-and-yang composition", and argued that the usage of piano in the song's second half was characteristic of "A Day in the Life". They went on to say the song suggested "that mental health is not some broad future goal, but an ongoing daily task". A music video for "Problem Solution" was released on April 24, 2020, via Americana Highways.

== Reception ==
Professional ratings
Review scores
Source	Rating
Americana UK	9/10
Exclaim!	9/10
Kerrang!	3/5
The Spill Magazine	4.5/5 stars

Americana UK called On the Widow's Walk a "near perfect new album from one of the great voices of the genre". They praised the quality of Shooter Jennings' production, the variety of the tracks, in particular the balance between "slower tracks and some out and out rockers", and the emotion in the White Buffalo's voice. Americana UK said that the album was "exactly the sort of record we've come to expect", whereas Exclaim! argued that Jennings' production separated it from previous White Buffalo albums, with his piano adding "some much needed flavour and discourse to the overall musical conversation", and called the overall album "a celebration of raw emotions and the unbridled passion of human spirit in song". AP news gave particular attention to the thematic variety of the album, comparing "No History" to the works of Bob Seger, "River of Love and Loss" to a murder ballad, and stated that "I Don't Know a Thing About Love" "closes the album with a credible exhibition of vulnerability".

Kerrang! described the White Buffalo as an "interesting and eerily predictive lyricist", but were overall more critical, arguing that the album was "too introspective to actively rock". On the Widow's Walk was the eighth best-selling album of 2020 on the Billboard Bluegrass Albums chart.

== Track listing ==
All tracks are written by the White Buffalo, except where noted.

No.	Title	Writer(s)	Length
1.	"Problem Solution"		4:46
2.	"The Drifter"		3:52
3.	"No History"		4:00
4.	"Sycamore"		3:52
5.	"Come On Shorty"	The White Buffalo; Rick Brantley	3:35
6.	"Cursive"		3:42
7.	"Faster Than Fire"		3:28
8.	"Widow's Walk"		3:59
9.	"River of Love and Loss"		3:55
10.	"The Rapture"		3:29
11.	"I Don't Know a Thing About Love"		3:50
Total length:			42:28

== Personnel ==
- The White Buffalo – writing, vocals
- Shooter Jennings – piano and keys, producer
- Matt Lynott – drums, percussion
- Christopher Hoffee – electric and bass guitar
- Ted Russell Kamp – bass
- John Schreffler Jr. – guitar
- Mark Rains – sound engineer
