= Sons of Anarchy season 4 =

Sons of Anarchy
- Season 4
- Season 4 DVD cover
- Starring: Charlie Hunnam; Katey Sagal; Mark Boone Junior; Dayton Callie; Kim Coates; Tommy Flanagan; Ryan Hurst; William Lucking; Theo Rossi; Maggie Siff; Ron Perlman
- No. of episodes: 14

Release
- Original network: FX
- Original release: September 6 – December 6, 2011

Season chronology
- ← Previous; Season 3 Next → Season 5

The fourth season of the American television drama series Sons of Anarchy premiered on September 6, 2011, and concluded on December 6, 2011, after 14 episodes aired on cable network FX. Created by Kurt Sutter, it is about the lives of a close-knit outlaw motorcycle club operating in Charming, a fictional town in California's Central Valley. The show centers on protagonist Jackson "Jax" Teller (Charlie Hunnam), the then–vice president of the club, and is first shown as the new president here, who begins questioning the club and himself.

It is the longest season of Sons of Anarchy and the only season to have 14 episodes, as every other season had 13 episodes.

The season premiere ("Out") was written by series creator and executive producer Kurt Sutter and was one of the highest-rated telecasts in FX's history.

Sons of Anarchy is the story of the Teller-Morrow family of Charming, California, as well as other members of the Sons of Anarchy Motorcycle Club, Redwood Original (SAMCRO), their families, various Charming townspeople, allied and rival gangs, associates, and law agencies that undermine or support SAMCRO's legal and illegal enterprises.

== Plot ==
After the deaths of Agent Stahl and Jimmy O’Phelan, the imprisoned SAMCRO members leave the penitentiary after their 14-month stay and are met by Lieutenant Eli Roosevelt of the San Joaquin Sheriff's Department, the new law enforcement presence in Charming. They also discover Hale has become the mayor. US Attorney Lincoln Potter seeks Lieutenant Roosevelt's help to build a RICO case against SAMCRO.

== Cast and characters ==
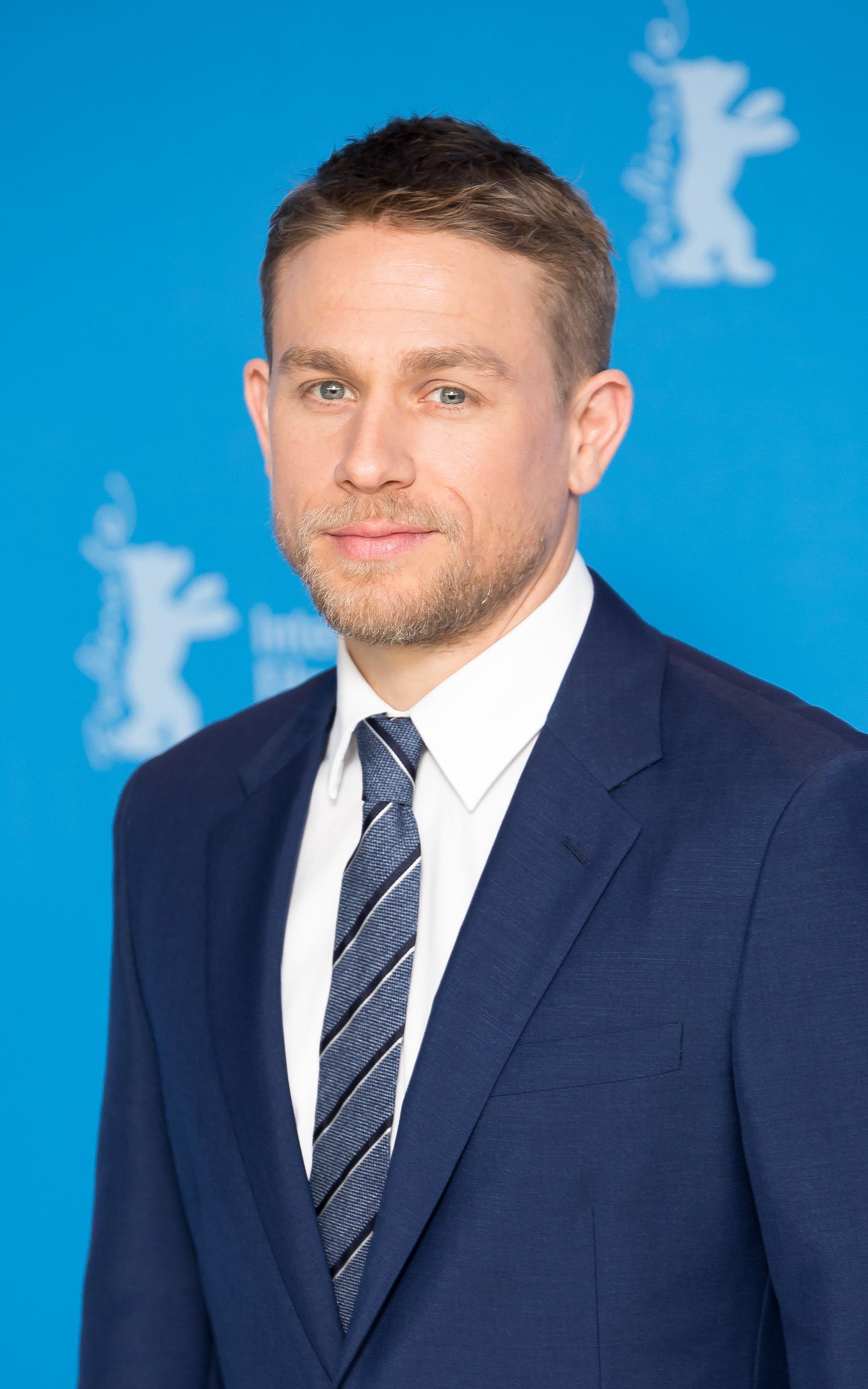
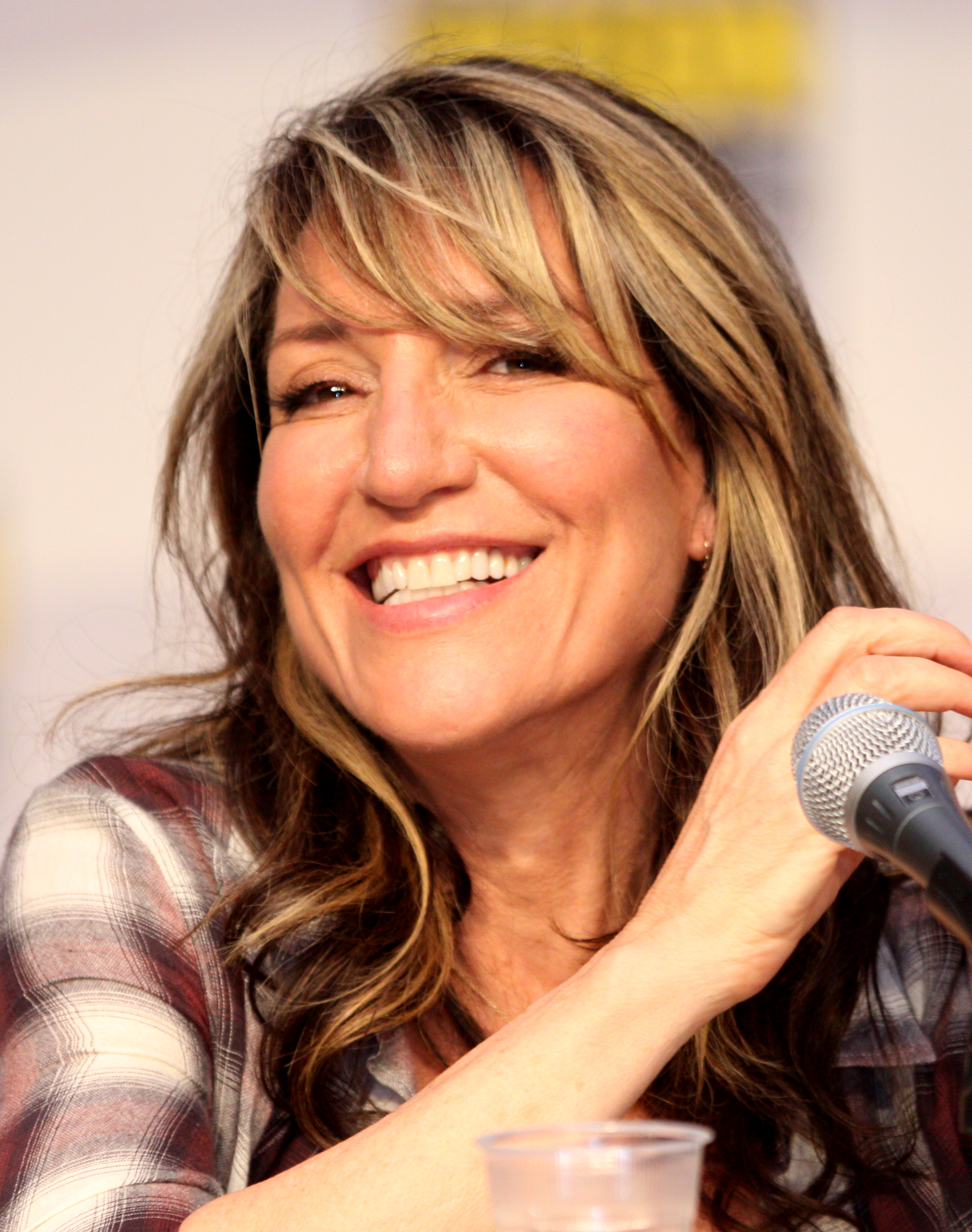
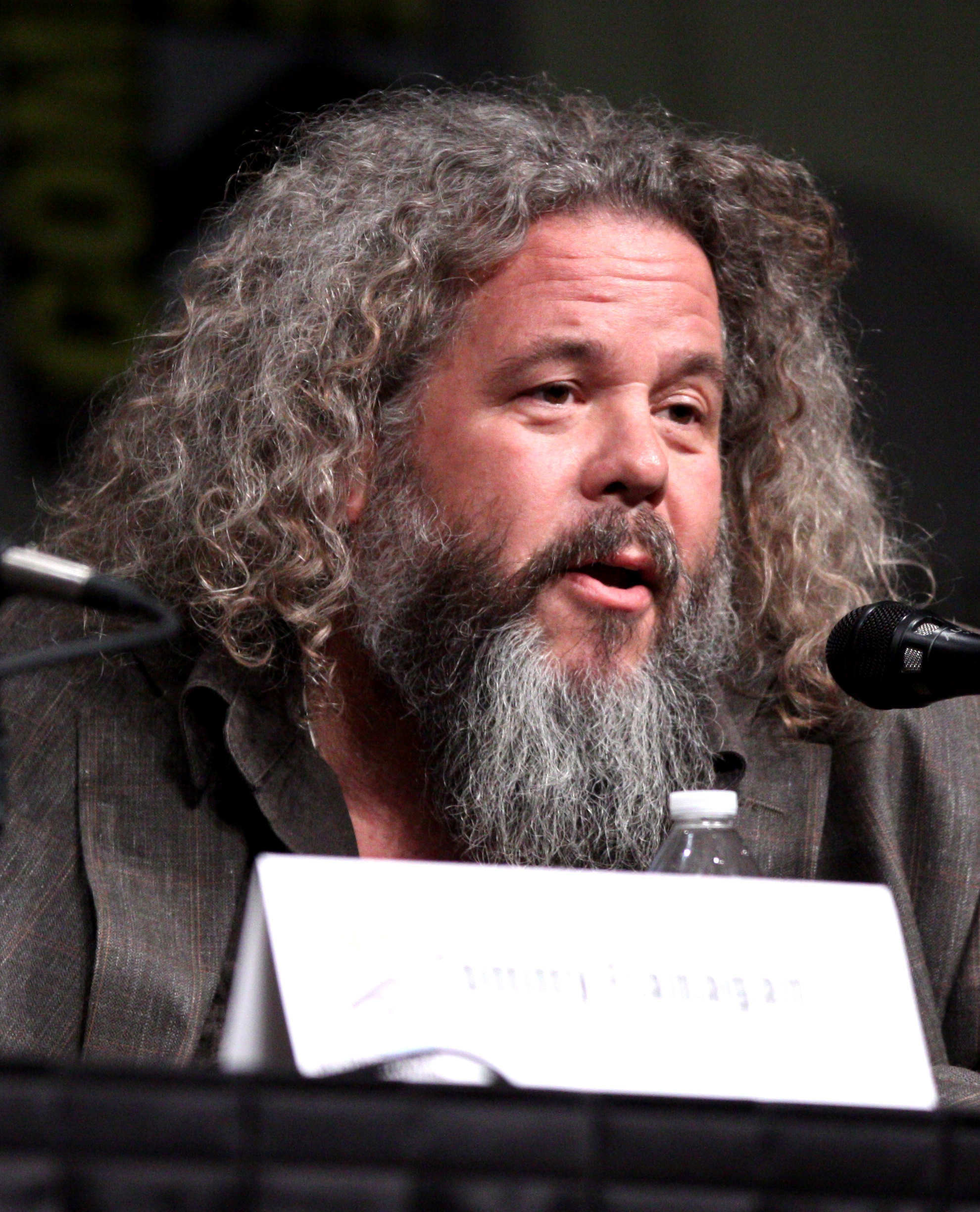
Charlie Hunnam (Jax Teller), Katey Sagal (Gemma Teller Morrow), and Mark Boone Junior (Bobby Munson)
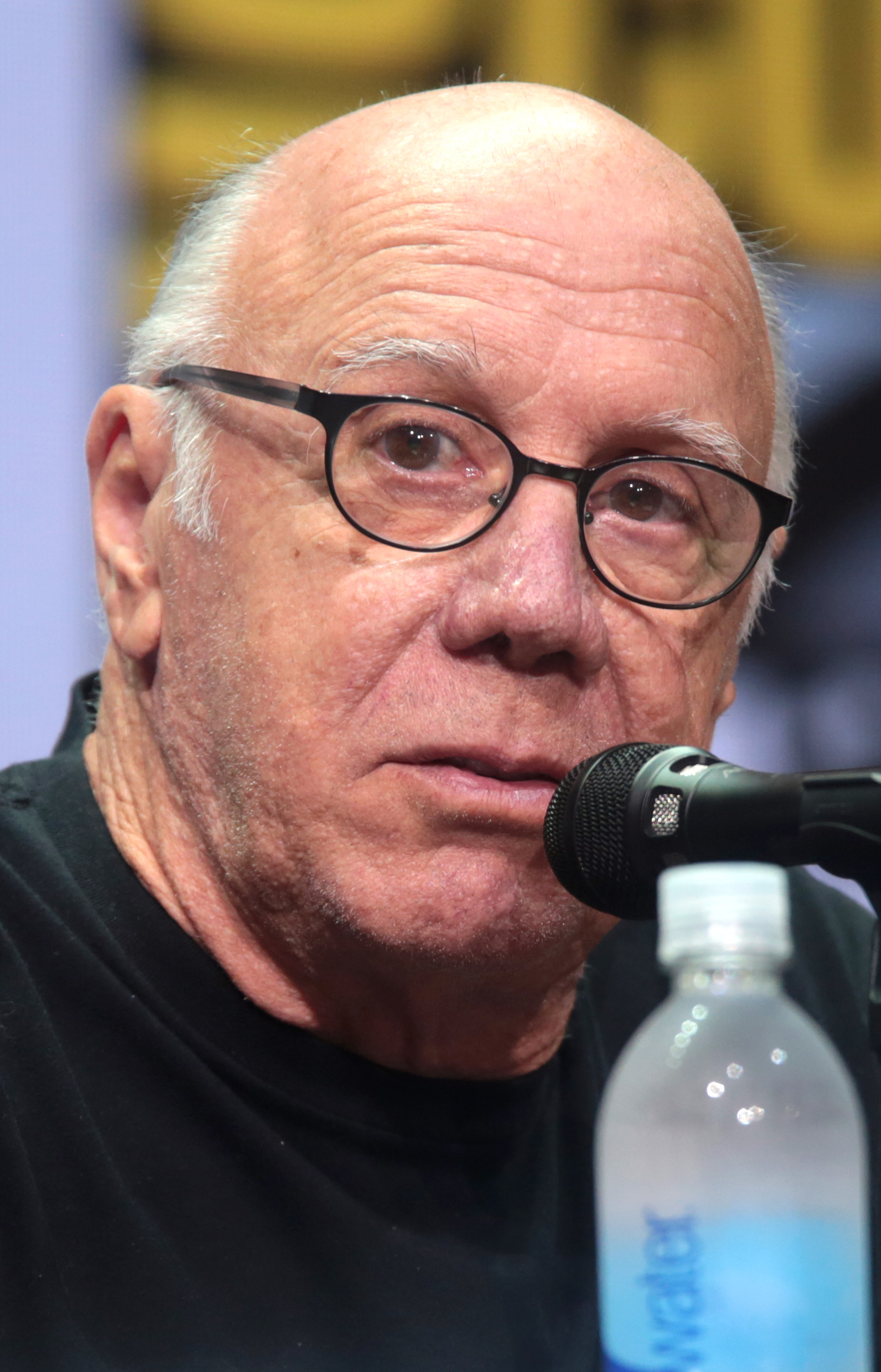
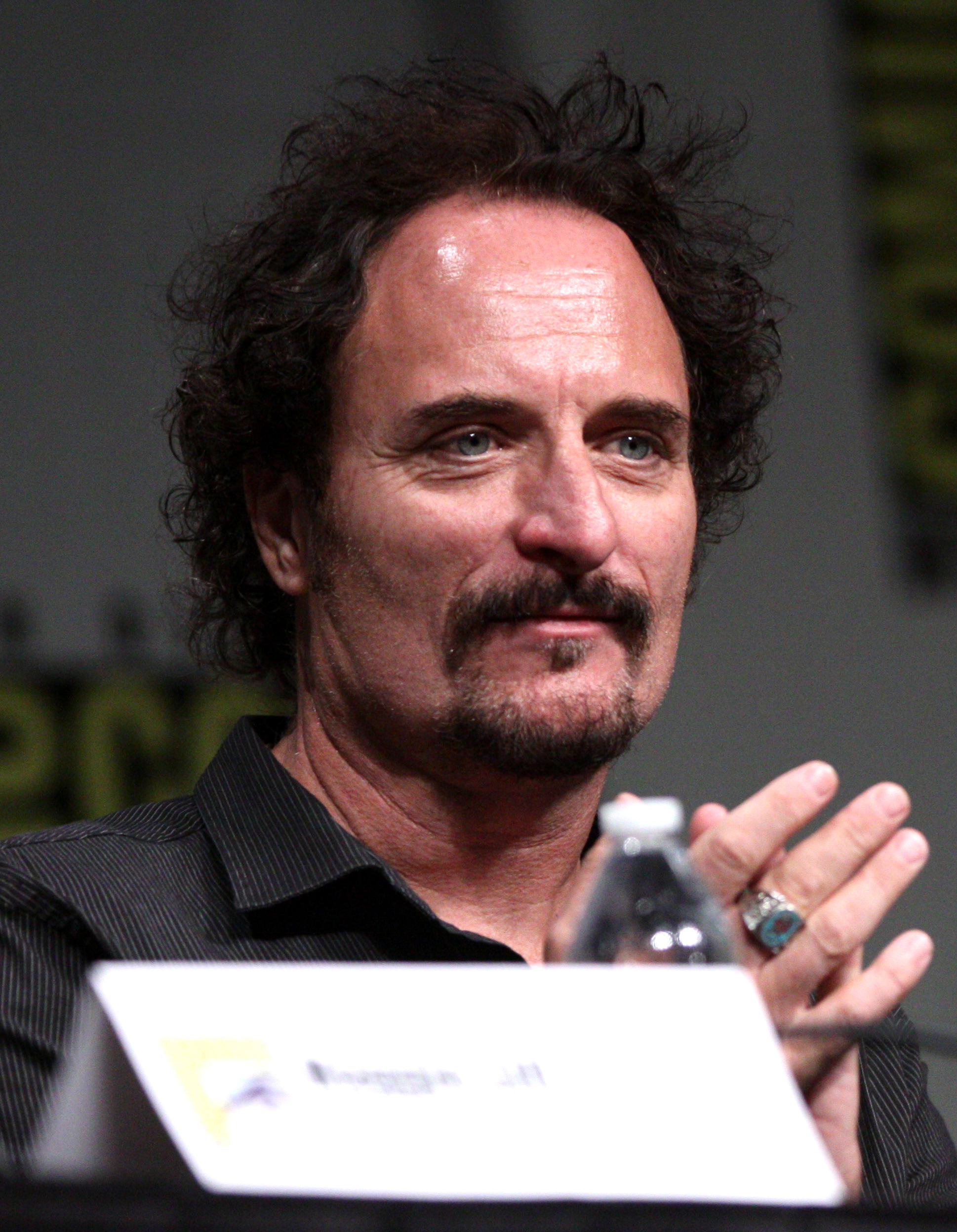
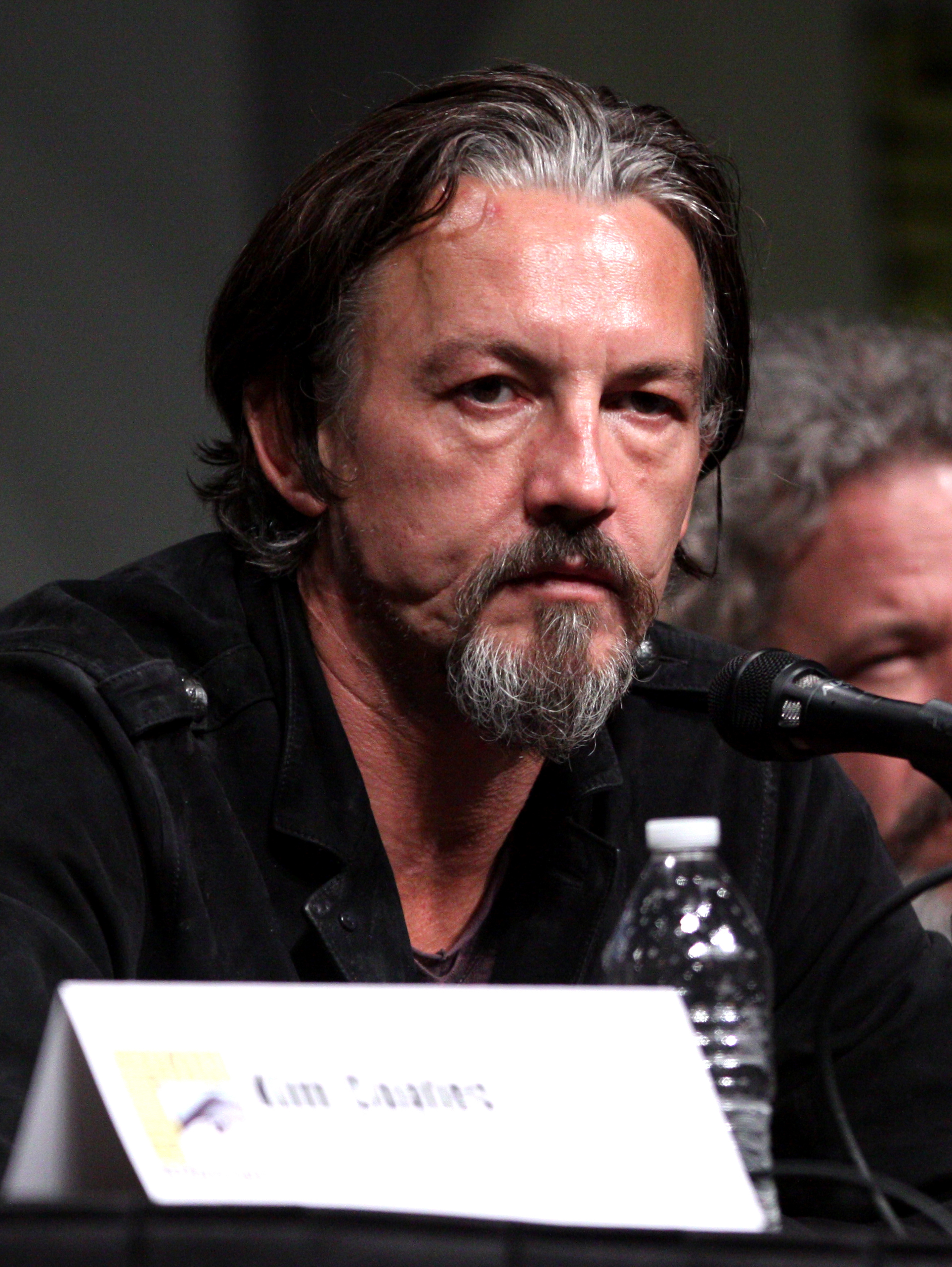
Dayton Callie (Wayne Unser), Kim Coates (Tig Trager) and Tommy Flanagan (Chibs Telford)
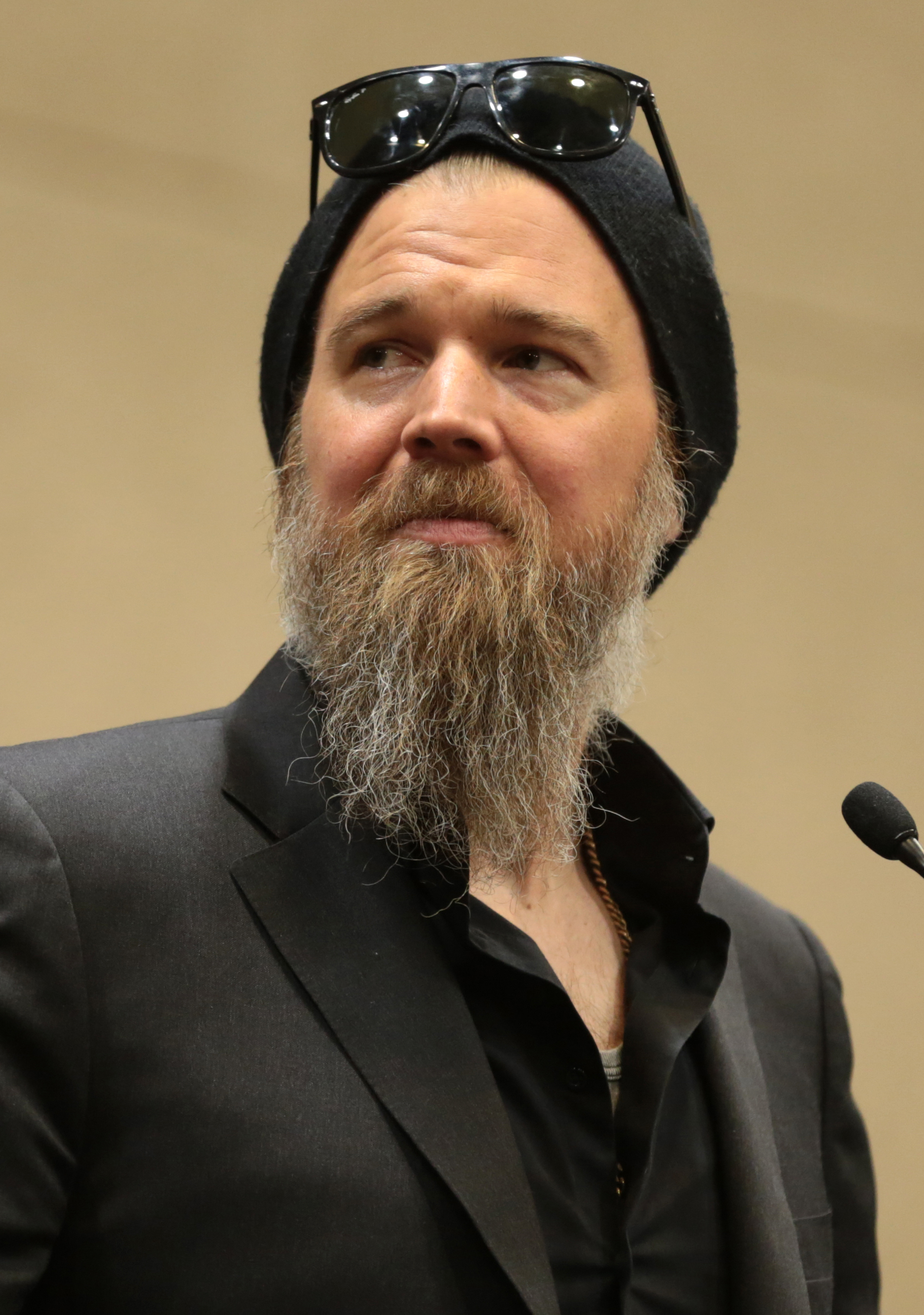
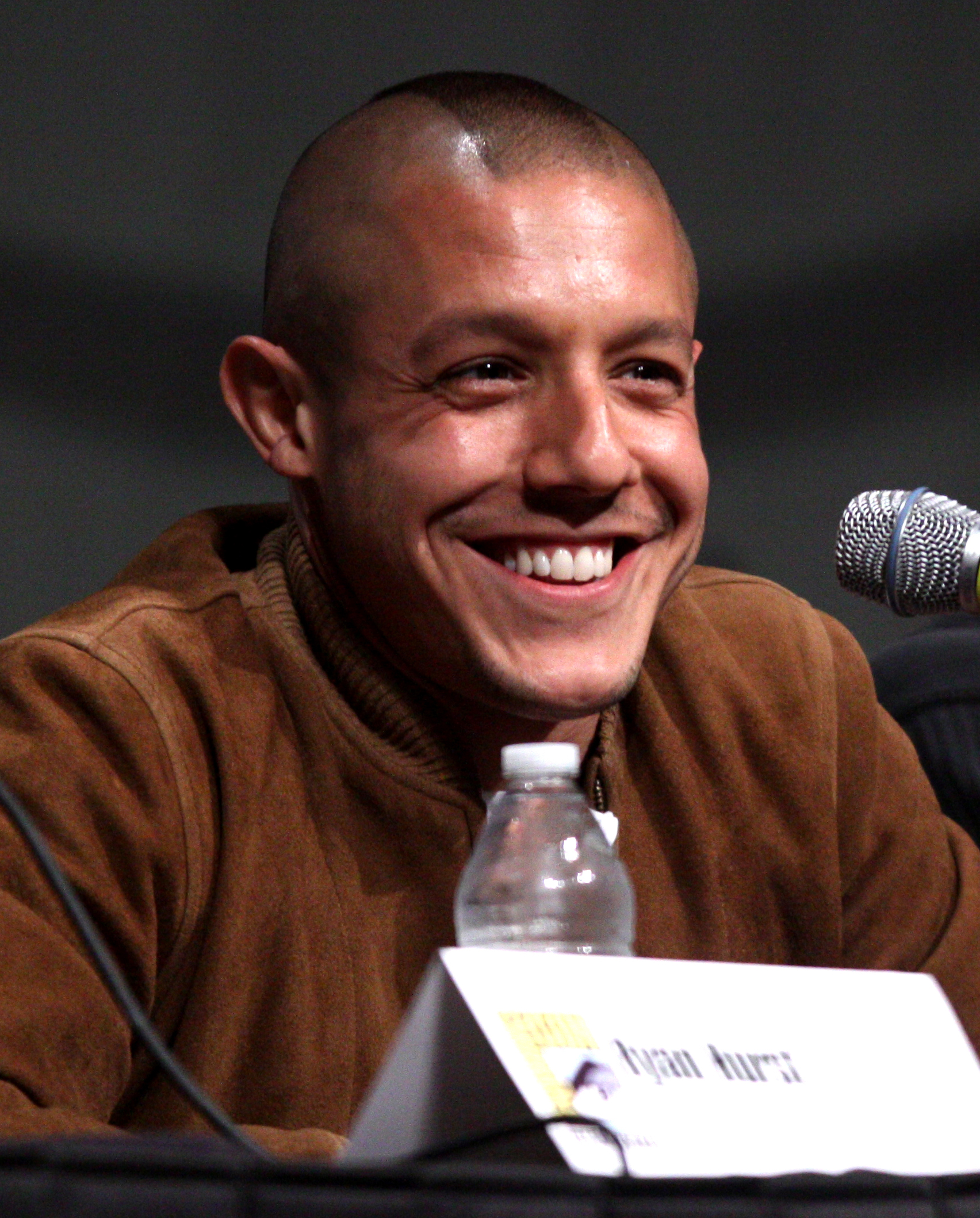
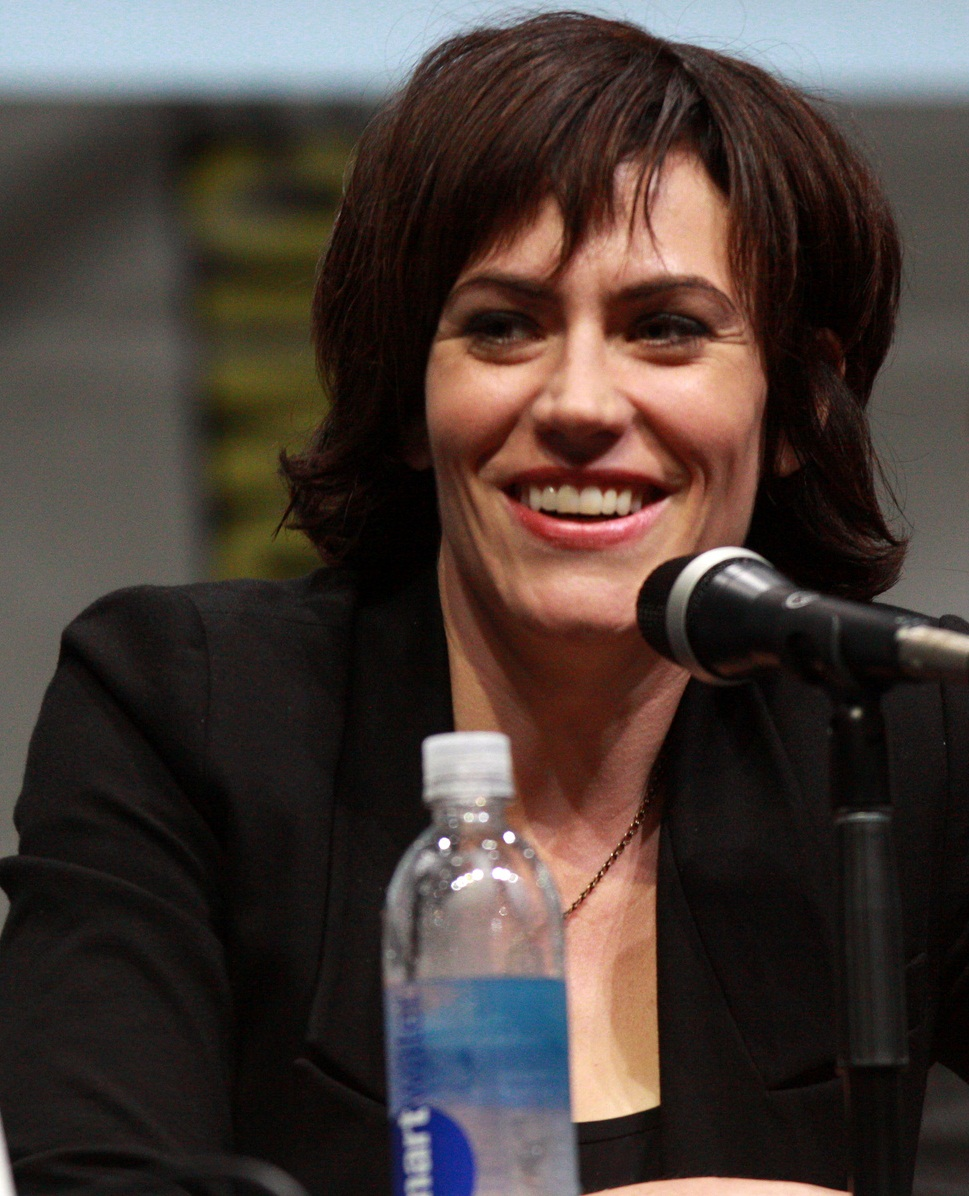
Ryan Hurst (Opie Winston), Theo Rossi (Juice Ortiz), and Maggie Siff (Tara Knowles)
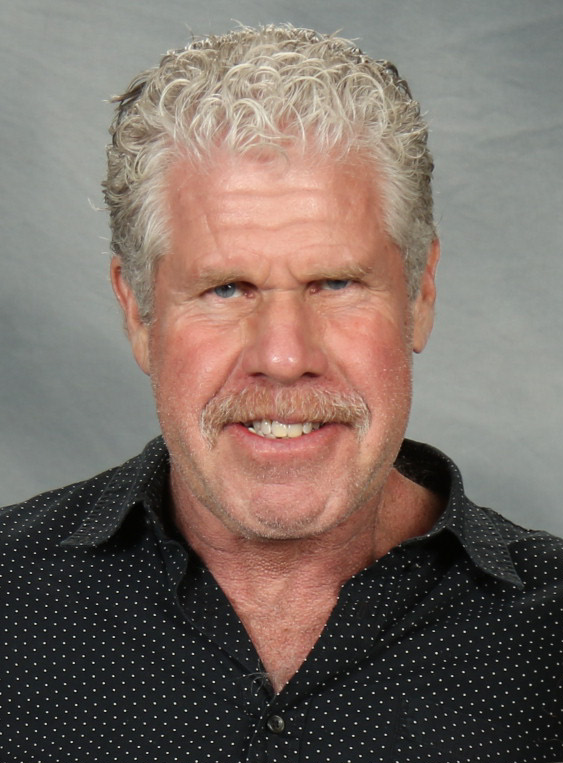
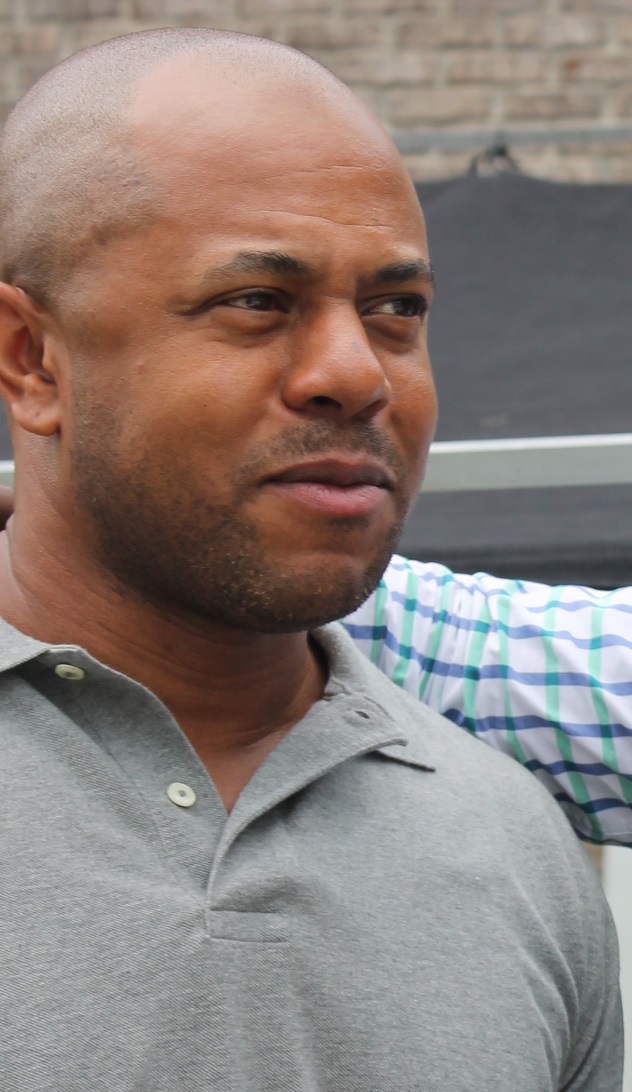
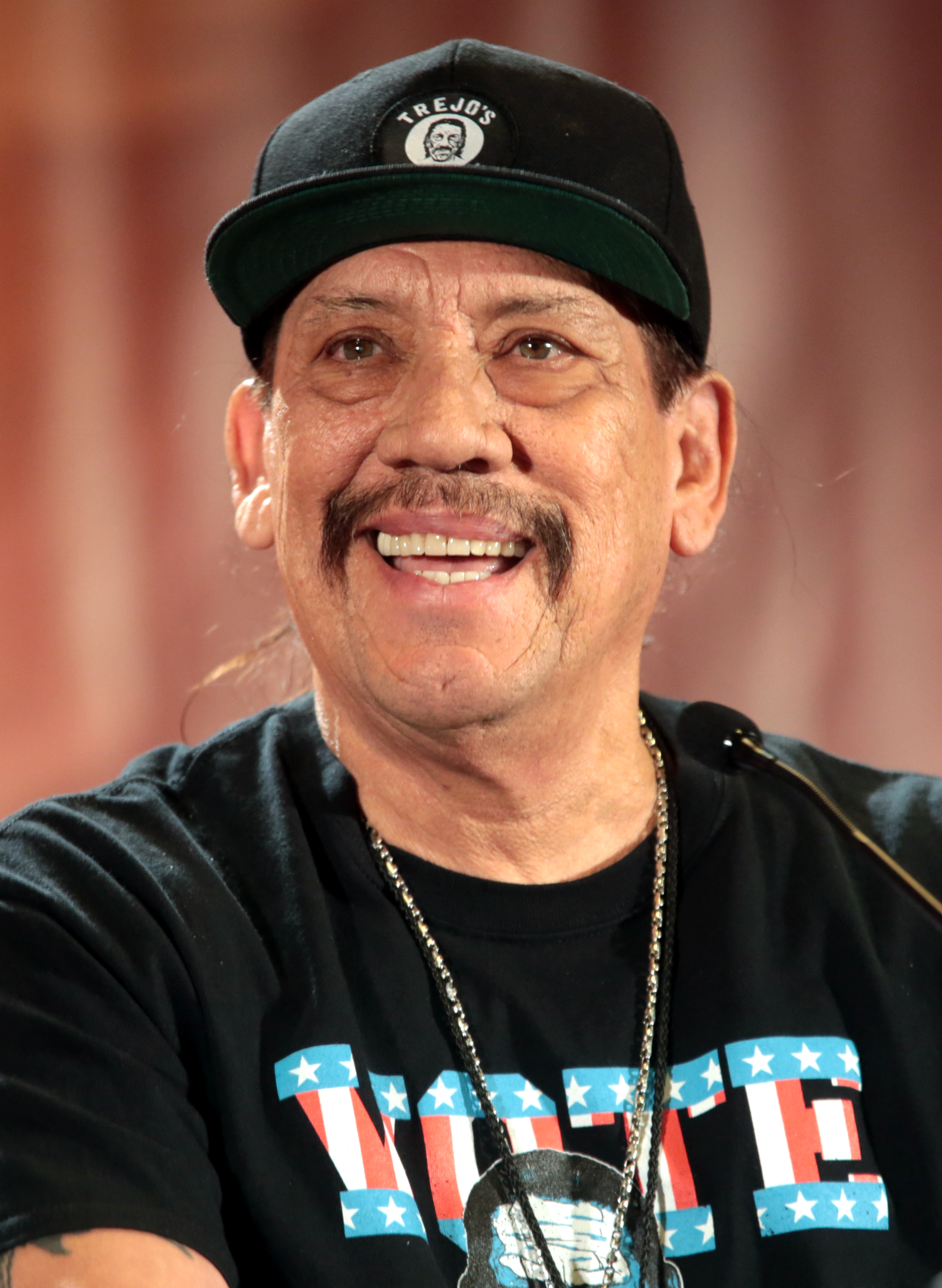
Ron Perlman (Clay Morrow), Rockmond Dunbar (Lieutenant Eli Roosevelt), and Danny Trejo (Romero "Romeo" Parada)

Sons of Anarchy is the story of the Teller-Morrow family of Charming, California, as well as the other members of Sons of Anarchy Motorcycle Club, Redwood Original (SAMCRO), their families, various Charming townspeople, allied and rival gangs, associates, and law agencies that undermine or support SAMCRO's legal and illegal enterprises.

=== Main cast ===
- Charlie Hunnam as Jackson "Jax" Teller
- Katey Sagal as Gemma Teller Morrow
- Mark Boone Junior as Robert "Bobby Elvis" Munson
- Dayton Callie as Wayne Unser
- Kim Coates as Alex "Tig" Trager
- Tommy Flanagan as Filip "Chibs" Telford
- Ryan Hurst as Harry "Opie" Winston
- William Lucking as Piermont "Piney" Winston
- Theo Rossi as Juan-Carlos "Juice" Ortiz
- Maggie Siff as Tara Knowles-Teller
- Ron Perlman as Clarence "Clay" Morrow

=== Special guest cast ===
- Rockmond Dunbar as Lieutenant Eli Roosevelt
- Ray McKinnon as Assistant U.S. Attorney Lincoln Potter
- Danny Trejo as Romero "Romeo" Parada
- Kenny Johnson as Herman Kozik
- Drea de Matteo as Wendy Case
- Marianne Jean-Baptiste as Vivica
- David Hasselhoff as Dondo
- Sonny Barger as Lenny "The Pimp" Janowitz

=== Recurring cast ===
- Christopher Douglas Reed as Philip "Filthy Phil" Russell
- Emilio Rivera as Marcus Alvarez
- David LaBrava as Happy Lowman
- Benito Martinez as Luis Torres
- David Rees Snell as Agent Grad Nicholas
- Michael Marisi Ornstein as Chuck Marstein
- Winter Ave Zoli as Lyla Winston
- McNally Sagal as Margaret Murphy
- Frank Potter as Eric Miles
- Jeff Kober as Jacob Hale Jr.
- Niko Nicotera as George "Rat Boy" Skogstorm
- Kurt Sutter as "Big" Otto Delaney
- Timothy V. Murphy as Galen O'Shay
- Merle Dandridge as Rita Roosevelt
- Kristen Renton as Ima
- Patrick St. Esprit as Elliott Oswald
- Bob McCracken as Brendan Roarke
- Walter Wong as Chris "V-Lin" Von Lin
- Tory Kittles as Laroy Wayne

=== Guest stars ===
- Tom Arnold as Georgie Caruso
- Randolph Mantooth as Charlie Horse
- Keith Szarabajka as Victor Putlova
- Rachel Miner as Dawn Trager
- Olivia Burnette as Homeless Woman
- Brian Goodman as Huff (Vice President of SAMTAZ)
- Paul John Vasquez as Angel Ganz

== Production ==
Although Sons of Anarchy is set in Northern California's Central Valley, it is filmed primarily at Occidental Studios Stage 5A in North Hollywood. Main sets located there include the clubhouse, St. Thomas Hospital and Jax's house. The production rooms at the studio used by the writing staff also double as the Charming police station. External scenes are often filmed nearby in Sun Valley and Tujunga.

== Reception ==
Alan Sepinwall stated that the fourth season risked predictability by returning to a successful formula of storytelling, but he nonetheless preferred those episodes to those of season three. Maureen Ryan reviewed the fourth season positively. She praised the addition of Lincoln Potter (played by Ray McKinnon), comparing the character's quality to that of antagonist Gustavo Fring from Breaking Bad. On review aggregator website Rotten Tomatoes, the season has a rare approval rating of 100% based on 24 reviews. The site's critical consensus reads: "Sons of Anarchy's fourth season is a smart return to the show's original themes, integrated with buzzworthy new elements."

The A.V. Club called the fourth season more "focused" and "operatic". AV Club reviewer Zack Handlen was fond of the season but felt disappointed with the finale, saying it featured a "lousy case of dictated convenience, of an arbitrary and unbelievable reveal used to shift characters around to where the writers want them to be for next season, as opposed to where they might land organically." However, the review did praise Charlie Hunnam's performance in the finale. TIME said the fourth season was the strongest since season two, but the show needed to end sooner rather than later. TIME also agreed that the finale's contrivances were sometimes too visible, stating "it’s the principle: you can only turn up alive at your own funeral so many times before it starts to lose its impact."

== Episodes ==
No. overall	No. in season	Title	Directed by	Written by	Original release date	Prod. code	U.S. viewers (millions)
40	1	"Out"	Paris Barclay	Kurt Sutter	September 6, 2011	4WAB01	4.93
Jax, Clay and the four other members of SAMCRO are released from prison after serving fourteen months for federal weapon charges. They return to Charming, California, to find that a new mayor, Jacob Hale Jr., is spearheading a new real estate development in the town. Clay sends Gemma to enlist Unser, recently deposed as police chief, to help stop the housing development. Jax's girlfriend, Tara Knowles, has given birth to a son, Thomas, during his imprisonment. Jax proposes to Tara and reveals his desire to leave SAMCRO. Opie and Lyla get married in a ceremony on an Indian reservation, while SAMCRO brutally severs its ties to the Russian Mob. Elsewhere, a new sheriff (Rockmond Dunbar) and an Assistant U.S. Attorney (Ray McKinnon) set up a secret task force to shut down SAMCRO's gunrunning operation.
41	2	"Booster"	Guy Ferland	Dave Erickson & Chris Collins	September 13, 2011	4WAB02	3.71
Gemma finds the note from Maureen Ashby that came with the final letters from Jax's father John. She worries that either Tara or Jax knows the truth: that John believed Clay and Gemma would be responsible for his death. After Gemma sees Abel retrieve one of the letters from Tara's purse, she goes to Tara's office to look for the rest of the files, and finds them, along with a death certificate signed by Unser. She warns Unser that Tara is starting to dig into John's past. SAMCRO dump the bodies of their Russian victims on the land of Charming Heights, Mayor Hale's real estate development. Mayans president Marcus Alvarez introduces Clay to Romero "Romeo" Parada, a representative of the Gallindo drug cartel. They sell the cartel their entire gun stock and field a request for heavier munitions. Parada also gives Clay cocaine to sell. The club is fiercely divided on trafficking drugs, and Clay, who wants to cash out as his arthritis worsens, asks Jax for his decisive swing vote. Jax agrees on the condition that Clay not stop him from leaving the Sons of Anarchy when Clay goes, and Clay reluctantly agrees. Opie and Jax pay a visit to the Wahewa Indian reservation to check on their bullet fabricating operation, but are ambushed and captured by members of the Russian mob, who demand the return of their guns. The mobsters give Clay one hour to retrieve the weapons, but before Clay and the others can act, the police arrive to question the club about the dead Russians. Under the facetious pretense of performing a fire inspection in the clubhouse, Lieutenant Roosevelt goes to town on the furniture and windows with a fire axe. Romeo Parada and his men arrive at the Wahewa reservation and rescue Jax and Opie, having heard about the hostage situation from their contacts in the Russian mob. As the members of SAMCRO survey the damage to their clubhouse, Tara announces her engagement to Jax, and the group celebrates.
42	3	"Dorylus"	Peter Weller	Regina Corrado & Liz Sagal	September 20, 2011	4WAB03	3.42
A group of black youths challenge Kozik to a game of pick up basketball while he is busy loading a truck with guns. When his guard is down, they knock him down and steal the truck. Jax and his men turn to Vivica, a local fence and drug dealer, to see if she has the guns, but she does not. Just then, they spot the thieves' car and give chase, but the thieves are pulled over for speeding. Juice bravely distracts the police by shooting at their car, and SAMCRO interrogate the thieves, who reveal that they sold the guns to Vivica's sons Luther and Vandross. The club returns to Vivica's house, where her sons admit that they planned to sell the guns to surprise their mother with a pickup truck for her birthday. She returns the guns to the club and yells at her oafish boys. The U.S. Attorney's taskforce intimidates Juice, and Roosevelt reveals that he knows Juice's father is Black - a revelation that Roosevelt insists would get him expelled from SAMCRO and possibly killed. Gemma confronts Tara about the existence of John Teller's letters, sharing details of her troubled first marriage and beseeching Tara not to tell Jax. Piney attempts to influence Clay's vote by telling Gemma about the cartel. Meanwhile, Clay attempts to sway Bobby in favor of the cartel vote by promising to make him president of SAMCRO upon his retirement. The cartel deal is approved by a narrow 6-5 vote, with Clay, Jax, Tig, Opie, Miles, and Kozik voting "yea" and Chibs, Piney, Happy, Bobby, and Juice voting "nay".
43	4	"Una Venta"	Billy Gierhart	Kurt Sutter & Marco Ramirez	September 27, 2011	4WAB04	3.28
SAMCRO goes to Tucson to meet with the cartel, and links up with the Sons of Anarchy Tucson Arizona chapter (SAMTAZ). They quickly discover that their Tucson comrades have been dealing methamphetamine. Jax learns that shortly before SAMTAZ voted to enter the drug game, two members left the organization: Little Paul was killed and Reggie quit shortly after. He discovers that the club's Vice President and Sergeant-at-Arms, Huff and Benny, were responsible for murdering Paul and forcing Reggie out, anticipating that they would oppose the club's foray into drug dealing. SAMTAZ excommunicates the two traitors, but votes unanimously to stay in the meth business, much to SAMCRO's chagrin. Gemma seeks out Chief Roosevelt's wife, Rita, and donates generously to her charity, which seeks to oppose the Charming Heights development. Piney visits Tara in the hospital, seeking to learn what she knows about John Teller. Gemma warns Piney not to dig too deep. Potter visits Otto in solitary confinement and reveals that his late wife, Luann, was sleeping with Bobby. He promises to get Otto out of solitary if he turns on the club. SAMCRO meet with Romeo and pick up their first shipment of cocaine.
44	5	"Brick"	Paris Barclay	Dave Erickson & Brady Dahl	October 4, 2011	4WAB05	3.51
Otto reaches out to Gemma and demands justice for the murder of Luann. Luann's successor Dondo helps SAMCRO lure Georgie Caruso to his set to avenge Luann. The club prepares to kill him, but relents when they discover that he has stumbled upon a lucrative business opportunity, backed by wealthy Asian investors: sex dolls. Bobby visits Otto in prison and lies that the deed is done. On the set, Opie discovers birth control in Lyla's dressing room. Angry that she is sabotaging their attempts to conceive, he sleeps with Ima. Piney tells Clay that he's read John Teller's letters, and demands that Clay steer the club away from the drug trade. Gemma and Clay each turn to Unser for help finding the letters: Gemma wants to destroy them, while Clay wants them as insurance against Piney. Unser breaks into Tara's office but finds only photocopies of the letters; when he reads them, he is shocked by their contents and attempts to burn them, though Clay arrives in time to retrieve what he can from the fire. Roosevelt gives Juice two days to bring him a brick of cocaine so they can test where it's coming from. Juice steals a brick so that he can bag a sample, but accidentally falls asleep before he can return it. As the Mayans and SAMCRO meet to distribute the bricks, Chibs announces that one is missing; both gangs eye each other suspiciously.
45	6	"With an X"	Guy Ferland	Chris Collins & Regina Corrado	October 11, 2011	4WAB06	3.56
After a tense standoff, Clay and Alvarez agree that whoever stole the missing brick has to die. The club psychologically terrifies the two prospects expecting them to fess up, but neither cracks. Juice retrieves the brick from its hiding place, but is caught by Miles, who pulls a gun on him. The two tangle over the weapon and Juice is shot in the leg, but Juice is able to wrest control of the pistol and shoots Miles, before framing him for stealing the drugs. Lyla arrives at the clubhouse to find Ima leaving Opie's room. Opie says that he did it because he found her birth control pills, and when she admits to having an abortion, he tells her that he is leaving her until she decides what she wants. Jax lures Ima into her dressing room and throws her against a table, warning her to stay away from his family and the clubhouse. Tig's daughter Dawn comes to him asking for money to take her twin sister Fawn to rehab for bulimia. Gemma and Bobby look into her story and find it to be false, but Tig gives her the money anyway, claiming he enjoys having her around. Clay asks Romeo Parada for help with his Tara problem. Unser, worried for Tara's safety, leaves an intimidating note in her car to alert her that she is in danger.
46	7	"Fruit for the Crows"	Gwyneth Horder-Payton	Kurt Sutter & Liz Sagal	October 18, 2011	4WAB07	3.65
Gemma finds the note left for Tara and she is brought to the clubhouse for protection. Alvarez gives SAMCRO a tour of his cocaine smuggling operation, but as the group leave they are ambushed in a drive-by and Alvarez is shot. SAMCRO brings him to the clubhouse. Alvarez intimates that the ambush and the death threat may be work of a rival cartel. Jax follows the driver home and finds that he is an innocent who was forced to drive by the Lobos Sonora cartel, who are holding his family hostage. Romeo vows to send men to Charming as backup, but Bobby, who believes that Clay's actions have endangered the club, calls for a vote to replace Clay as president. When Juice demands to meet Potter before bringing Roosevelt the sample, Potter orders Roosevelt to entrap him with the sample, which Roosevelt reluctantly does after Potter threatens to file a complaint. Roosevelt releases Juice, who returns to the clubhouse, where Clay awards him a "Men of Mayhem" patch for his help with the Russians and Miles. At Miles' grave, a despairing Juice attempts to hang himself from a tree using a chain, but his attempt fails when a branch snaps.
47	8	"Family Recipe"	Paul Maibaum	Dave Erickson & Brady Dahl	October 25, 2011	4WAB08	3.82
As the gang votes on the future of Clay's presidency, the clubhouse is attacked by the Lobos Sonora cartel, who drop off the severed heads of two SAMTAZ members, including club president Armando's. One cartel member is captured in the attack, but the Mayans are hit simultaneously, losing three men and a truck full of drugs. Chuckie Marstein is forced to hide the severed heads in a pot of chili when the police stop by the clubhouse. Piney demands that Clay withdraw the club from the drug business, threatening to deliver John Teller's letters to the club if he fails. SAMCRO and the Mayans interrogate the cartel member, who claims that there is a rat in the Mayans. Jax suggests that they feed him false intel about the location of their guns, and ambush the cartel when they arrive to seize them. At the ambush, two trucks arrive, but one drives off. The Mayans and the Sons surround the remaining truck, which is empty except for the headless corpses of two Mayans and the two SAMTAZ members. Tara confronts Jax over the escalating violence, and he suggests she accept a job at another hospital and take their kids. Chibs discovers Juice trying to cover up the evidence of his attempted suicide, and comforts him. Clay convinces Elliott Oswald that the both of them should pony up the rest of the money for Rita Roosevelt's charity to stop the development of Charming Heights, arguing that Oswald will get his land back when Jacob Hale's deal fails. After the fundraiser, Clay arrives at Piney's house and kills him, scrawling the signature of the Lobos Sonora cartel on an old photo of the Sons of Anarchy's founding 'First 9.'
48	9	"Kiss"	Billy Geirhart	Regina Corrado & Marco Ramirez	November 1, 2011	4WAB09	3.63
The Niners have made a new alliance that affects SAMCRO's agenda. Gemma and Unser see the fallout from Clay's actions. Tara plans a trip to Oregon to clear her head, and Jax decides to escort her. The Gallindo Cartel gives Clay a means to take out Tara once and for all.
49	10	"Hands"	Peter Weller	Chris Collins & David LaBrava & Kurt Sutter	November 8, 2011	4WAB10	3.93
Jax and Tara discover the peaceful possibilities of life outside of SAMCRO, but the harsh reality of their inability to leave the rest of the group behind quickly makes itself known to the two of them. Tensions between Gemma and Clay finally boil over. As Potter puts a deal on the table for Juice, Roosevelt tries to do Juice a favor.
50	11	"Call of Duty"	Gwyneth Horder-Payton	Liz Sagal & Gladys Rodriguez	November 15, 2011	4WAB11	4.23
Oswald notifies Clay that Hale has successfully lobbied Georgie Caruso's Asian investors for the capital to forge ahead on Charming Heights. Otto agrees to turn on the Sons, but demands that his execution is moved forward and that he be the one to tell Bobby and the club. Jax's ex-wife Wendy Case brings Tara a vase of flowers in the hospital, and makes known her intention to reclaim her place in the life of her son, Abel. After Wendy leaves, A furious Tara smashes the vase and breaks her cast, further injuring her wounded hand. Gemma visits the hospital and learns that Jax and Tara are planning to leave Charming. She meets with Wendy and warns her to stay away from Abel until Tara has recovered. Tig retires as sergeant-at-arms after seeing what Clay did to Gemma. Jax is forced to put his anger towards Clay on hold while the club prepares to strike back at the Lobos Sonora cartel. The Sons and the Gallindo cartel surround the cartel encampment, but wander into a minefield, where Kozik and several others are killed. Jax and Chibs arrive with RPGs and turn the tide, wiping out the Lobos Sonora for good. Bobby, Tig, and Opie turn to Lyla for help locating Georgie Caruso to punish him for inadvertently helping Hale. As they stuff him in the trunk of a car, he admits to sending men after Luann, but only with the intention of roughing her up. Tig and Opie fill his car with bullets. Opie takes the tow truck up to Piney's cabin and finds his father's body. Unser follows him to the cabin and tells him that Clay is the man responsible.
51	12	"Burnt and Purged Away"	Paris Barclay	Kurt Sutter & Dave Erickson	November 22, 2011	4WAB12	3.85
SAMCRO negotiates with the Irish Kings to secure the club's future. Jax confronts Wendy over her return to Charming. Clay tries to make a deal with Tara. Meanwhile, Otto's deal with Potter goes through, much to Bobby's dismay. Opie's trust in Jax and the club is broken as he seeks revenge. On Gemma's request, Wayne tries to undo the damage he's done.
52	13	"To Be (Act 1)"	Kurt Sutter	Kurt Sutter & Chris Collins	November 29, 2011	4WAB13	4.42
In the aftermath of Clay's shooting, Jax's cover up puts Tig on the hunt and Laroy in danger. While on the verge of the Irish/cartel meeting, Juice and Bobby's disappearance puts the club on edge. Gemma reveals family history in an attempt to pull Jax closer, while Tara ensures her family's departure from Charming.
53	14	"To Be (Act 2)"	Kurt Sutter	Kurt Sutter & Chris Collins	December 6, 2011	4WAB14	4.24
History repeats itself when Jax's future in Charming and with the MC is finally determined. Potter's RICO case takes an unusual turn when the Gallindo Cartel reveals its true intentions. The vote is made on Hale's Charming Heights proposition. SAMCRO makes a shift in its members' ranks.

== Home media release ==
The fourth season was released in the United States on DVD and Blu-ray on August 28, 2012.
