= Battleme =

American singer-songwriter

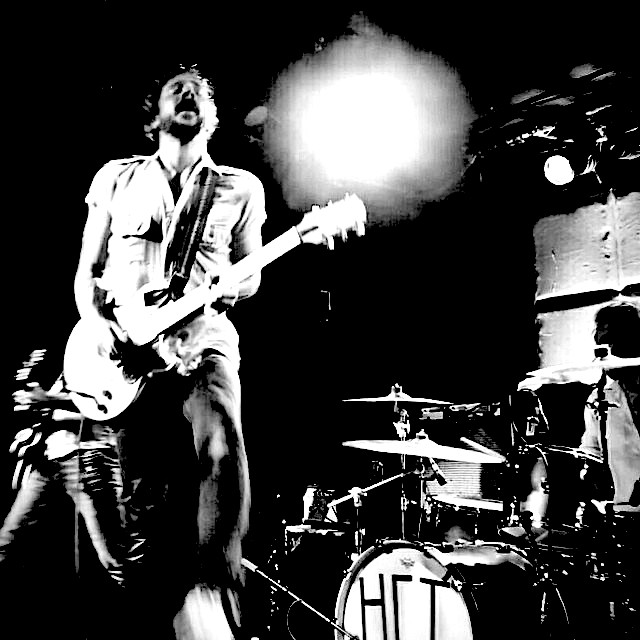
- Battleme @ The Echo (LA, CA)

Background information
- Also known as: Matt Vondy
- Origin: Austin, Texas U.S.
- Genre: Rock
- Years active: 2009–present
- Labels: El Camino Media, Sony Music Entertainment, Trashy Moped Recordings, Get Loud
- Members: Matt Drenik
- Website: Battleme official website

Battleme is the stage name and band of Lions singer Matt Drenik, an American musician and record producer. It was started as a creative outlet to other projects Drenik was involved in during 2009.

== Early career ==
Battleme first appeared in the season 2 finale of Sons of Anarchy on FX Network with the song, "Burn This Town." It was a departure from the guitar heavy band Lions that Drenik fronted. These spurts of lo-fi acoustic folk produced numerous songs that began to see Drenik breaking away from the heavy psychedelic outfits he had previously played in, one of which "No Time For Blood" was featured on NPR's KUT "Song of the Day."

== Battleme (2012) ==
In the summer of 2010, Drenik relocated to Portland, Oregon to solely focus on the project. He built a studio in the basement of his house and began recording the demos of what would become Battleme's self-titled debut full length. After tracking over 40 songs, the record was narrowed down to 10 and sent out. Thomas Turner of Ghostland Observatory responded and signed Drenik to his Trashy Moped Recordings label. Explaining in an interview to Best New Bands, "After he (Thomas) heard the songs, we hooked up on the phone and just started rattling off ideas. It was great. I don’t think he really cared about what others thought, or how many units would sell, or if we had a single. He just really dug the songs and wanted to put out the record because he thought it was cool. And that kind of meant everything to me." The two began working on the final version of the record in the fall of 2010 with Turner producing. In conjunction to working on the full-length record, Drenik released a quieter solo EP, Big Score, on his own imprint Get Loud. The record consisted of six previously recorded concrete folk numbers.

On March 8, 2012, the video for Battleme single "Touch" made its premiere on MTV Buzzworthy. That same year, the band also appeared at Music Fest NW (Portland, OR), Capitol Hill Block Party (Seattle, WA), SXSW (Austin, Texas) and Lobster Fest (LA, CA) in 2012.

== Sons of Anarchy (2010-2015) ==
Several Battleme songs appeared in Sons of Anarchy season 3, including a cover version of Neil Young's "Hey Hey, My My," which has received over 60 million YouTube views and an assortment of remixes by the likes of Stefan Biniak and others. Battleme's collaboration with Bob Thiele (Sons of Anarchy, The Forest Rangers) on songs "Time" and "Lights" was released on November 19, 2012, on the Sons of Anarchy Volume II soundtrack via Columbia Records. On December 6, 2012, Esquire picked the Battleme / Thiele collaboration "Lights" as one of the 10 Best Songs of the Week, stating, "Because if the Flaming Lips had written an original song for their Dark Side of the Moon live shows, this is what it might've sounded like.". Drenik began appearing with The Forest Rangers as Battleme on multiple original songs for the show. He remained working with them through 7 seasons of the series.

== Future Runs Magnetic (2014) ==
In the spring of 2013, Drenik left Trashy Moped Recordings and signed with El Camino Media, an LA imprint headed by former EMI VP of Publishing Matt Messer. He went into the studio in April to work on his 2nd full-length album with producer Doug Boehm (Girls, Guided By Voices, Tokyo Police Club). The record was released to positive reviews with American Songwriter stating, "a timeless collection of rock anthems." The video for the first single, "Just Weight", premiered on Filter.

In the spring of 2014, Battleme toured the US in support of Future Runs Magnetic, opening for The Toadies and The Supersuckers on three US legs. That summer, Battleme opened for Veruca Salt for 10 shows on the Midwest and East Coast legs of the tour.

== Habitual Love Songs (2016) ==
For Battleme's next album, Drenik decided to self-produce, working in his home studio as well as tracking at Revolver Studio with Collin Hegna in Portland, OR.

On October 29, 2015, Billboard premiered the first track, "Shake Shake", off Battleme's upcoming record Habitual Love Songs. The record was released on January 15, 2016, via El Camino Media. On December 19, 2015, the track was featured on Seattle's KEXP as "Song of the Day". In January 2016, "Habitual Love Songs" was released to positive reviews, with Relix noting, "From the driving riff and disaffected vocals of 'Shake Shake' to the jangly Wilco-sequel country sheen of 'Back To You', Battleme delivers something for everyone." The album premiered on BlackBook that same month, with the blog stating it's "full of sexually charged, slithery, Stones-like blues rockers."

In October 2016, Drenik's full band embarked on a headlining tour of Europe, ending with five live appearances in Greece.

== Live From Cactus Cafe (2017) ==
In November 2016, Drenik announced via his website that a live, solo EP was slated to be released in January 2017 via El Camino Media. The four song set was recorded at the Cactus Cafe in Austin, Texas on May 3, 2014, and includes a live version of "Burn This Town", originally featured on the Sons of Anarchy Volume 2 Soundtrack. In February 2017, Drenik embarked on a European solo tour playing select shows in Italy and Portugal.

== Cult Psychotica (2017) ==
In June 2017, Battleme announced via multiple outlets the release of a new record, Cult Psychotica, via El Camino Media on Oct 6, 2017, along with a series of European tour dates in support. The album's theme was heavily influenced by the American political system and, more overtly, the outcome of the 2016 election. On August 27, 2017, Classic Rock via Team Rock premiered Battleme's first UK single, "Testament" stating "Testament is the latest single and comes bearing blues-based riffage of the most swashbuckling calibre. A few weeks later, Flood Magazine (US) premiered Battleme's first US single, "Hot Mess", stating "in Drenik's hands, the draining of meaning and morality from the world results in nothing less than a post-punk-powered dance party. It's the same impulse that brought us The Rapture and Franz Ferdinand in the years after 9/11, newly revved up and goosed practically to oblivion and back." On October 27, 2017, AllMusic reviewer Matt Collar hailed the record's achievement with an 8 out of 10 rating, stating "the album is a red-eyed collection of fuzzy rock anthems, all centered on Drenik's throaty, nasal-pitched sneer. What he lacks in outright vocal resonance, he makes up for with strutting rock attitude and literate, philosophical lyrics that are equal parts Lou Reed and Elliott Smith." In their end of the year recap for 2017, Classic Rock listed the single 'Testament' as one of the year's best picks.

== Discography ==
=== Albums ===
Year	Title	Record label	Ref.
2012	Battleme	Trashy Moped Recordsings	
2014	Future Runs Magnetic	El Camino Media	
2016	Habitual Love Songs	Need Some Songs (BMI)	
2017	Cult Psychotica	Need Some Songs (BMI)	

=== EPS & Singles ===
Years	Title	Type	Record label	Ref.
2010	Big Score	EP	Get Loud	
2012	Touch	Single	Trashy Moped Recordings	
2013	Weight On the Brain	EP	El Camino Media	
2019	Where You Goin' Cha Cha?	Single	El Camino Media	

== Appearances ==
- "Hey Hey, My My" featured on season 3 of FX Network's Sons of Anarchy finale and soundtrack
- "Dead Man" featured on season 3 of Sons of Anarchy
- "Miles Away" with Slash featured on season 3 of Sons of Anarchy
- "Burn This Town" featured on season 2 of Sons of Anarchy
- "Here With Me" featured on season 4 finale of NBC's Chuck
- "Gun" featured on season 6 of CBS's Criminal Minds
- "Killer High" featured on season 4 of Sons of Anarchy
- "Big Score" featured on season 4 of Sons of Anarchy
- "Time" featured on season 4 of Sons of Anarchy
- "Lights" featured on season 5 of Sons of Anarchy
- "Trouble" featured on season 2 of Necessary Roughness
- "Shoot the Noise, Man" featured on the soundtrack of NHL 13
- "I See Through You" featured on season 6 of "Sons of Anarchy"
- "Shoot the Noise, Man" featured on PGA Golf commercial.
- "Shoot the Noise, Man" featured on Project Almanac Film Trailer.
- "Hey Hey, My My" featured on episode 2.3 of 13 Reasons Why
