= Matt Sorum discography =

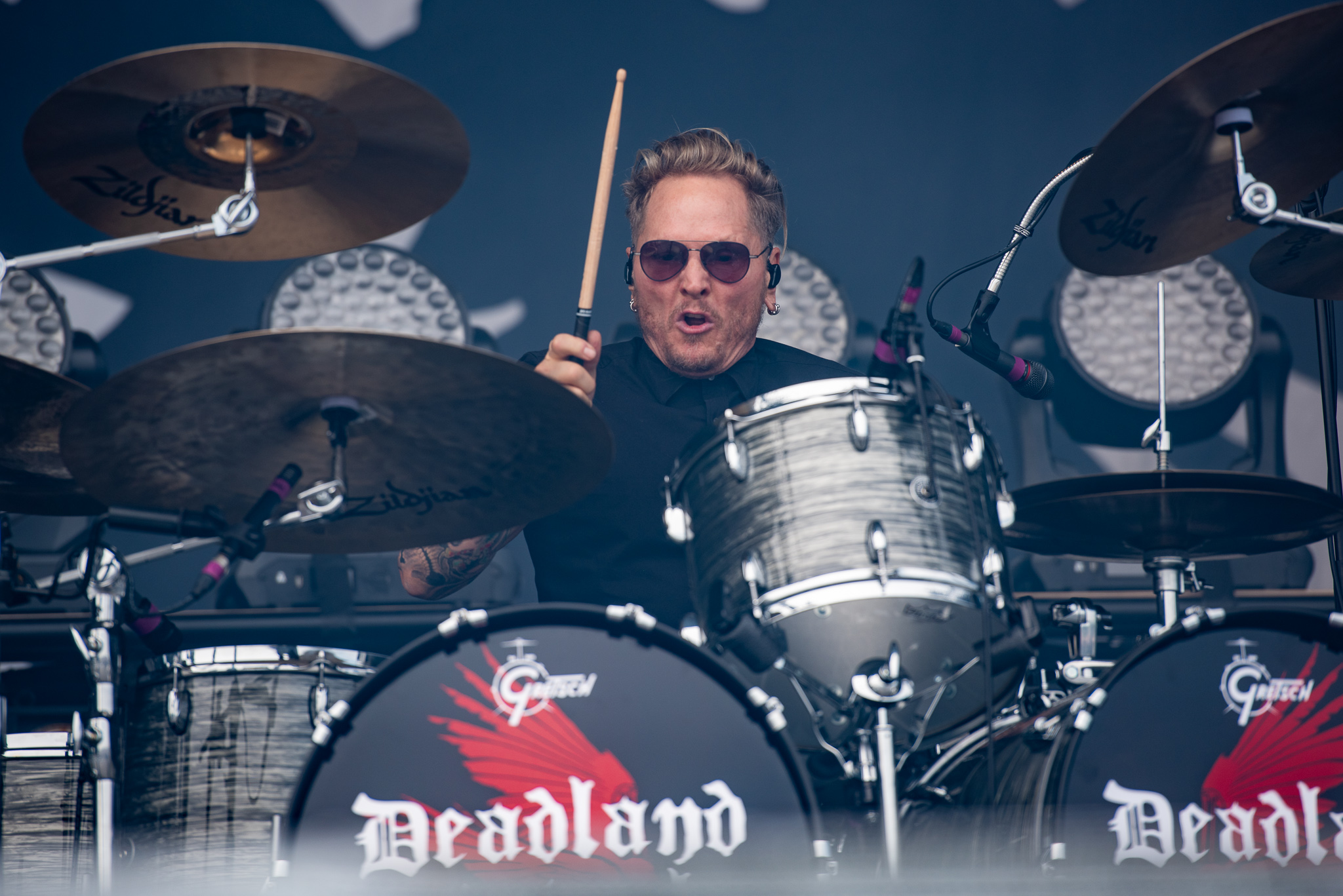
Sorum performing in 2019

Matt Sorum is an American rock drummer who has released two solo studio albums and a further 14 studio albums with various groups. He mainly plays drums.

== Solo ==
=== Albums ===
Year	Title
2004	Hollywood Zen: Released: June 1, 2004; Label: Brash Records; Formats: CD
2014	Stratosphere: Released: March 2014; Label: Rok Dok Recordings; Formats: CD, digital download

=== Other appearances ===
Year	Song	Album	Notes
1999	"Elected"	Humanary Stew: A Tribute to Alice Cooper	with Billy Duffy, Steve Jones, and Duff McKagan

== with Y Kant Tori Read ==
Year	Title
1988	Y Kant Tori Read: Released: June 1988; Label: Atlantic Records; Formats: CD, LP

== with Guns N' Roses ==
Year	Album details	Peak chart positions										Certifications (sales thresholds)
Year	Album details	US	AUS	AUT	CAN	GER	IRE	NL	SWE	SWI	UK	Certifications (sales thresholds)
1991	Use Your Illusion I: Released: September 17, 1991; Label: Geffen (#24415); Formats: CD, LP, CS	2	2	2	1	5	28	3	3	3	2	US: 7× Platinum; UK: Platinum; GER: 2× Platinum; CAN: Diamond
1991	Use Your Illusion II: Released: September 17, 1991; Label: Geffen (#24420); Formats: CD, LP, CS	1	1	1	1	3	29	2	4	2	1	US: 7× Platinum; UK: Platinum; GER: 5× Gold; CAN: 9× Platinum
1993	"The Spaghetti Incident?": Released: November 23, 1993; Label: Geffen (#24617); Formats: CD, LP, CS	4	1	4	3	5	—	4	2	3	2	US: Platinum; UK: Gold; GER: Gold; CAN: 3× Platinum
"—" denotes releases that did not chart or were not released in that country.

=== Other appearance ===
Year	Song	Album	Notes
1994	"Sympathy for the Devil"	Interview with the Vampire	The Rolling Stones cover

== with Slash's Snakepit ==
Year	Album details	Peak chart positions								Certifications
Year	Album details	US	AUS	DEN	NOR	NZ	SWI	SWE	UK	Certifications
1995	It's Five O'Clock Somewhere: Released: February 14, 1995; Label: Geffen; Format: CD	70	—	—	—	—	—	—	15	
"—" denotes releases that did not chart or were not released in that country.

== with the Power Rangers Orchestra ==
Year	Song	Album	Ref.
1995	"Go Go Power Rangers"	Mighty Morphin Power Rangers The Movie: Original Soundtrack Album	

== with Hawk ==
Year	Title
2001	Hawk: Released: March 13, 2001; Label: Perris Records; Formats: CD

== with The Cult ==
Year	Album details	Peak chart positions								Certifications
Year	Album details	US	AUS	DEN	NOR	NZ	SWI	SWE	UK	Certifications
2001	Beyond Good and Evil: Released: June 20, 2001; Label: Atlantic; Format: CD	37	61	—	—	33	93	—	69	—
"—" denotes releases that did not chart or were not released in that country.

== with Camp Freddy ==
Year	Songs	Album	Ref.
2006	"Surrender" and "Twentieth Century Boy"	Employee of the Month: Original Soundtrack	

== with Johnny Crash ==
Year	Title
2008	Unfinished Business: Released: 2008; Label: Sun City Records; Formats: CD

== with Kings of Chaos ==
Year	Song	Album
2012	"Never Before"	Re-Machined: A Tribute to Deep Purple's Machine Head

== with Deadland Ritual ==
Year	Title	Album
2018	"Down in Flames"	non-album single
2019	"Broken and Bruised"	non-album single

== with Tak Matsumoto Group (TMG) ==
Year	Title
2024	TMG II: Released: September 18, 2024; Label: Vermillion Records (Japan), Frontiers Music (Worldwide); Formats: CD

== Guest appearances ==
Year	Artist(s)	Album	Ref.
1987	Jeff Paris	Wired Up	
1993	Duff McKagan	Believe in Me	
1994	Gilby Clarke	Pawnshop Guitars	
1994	Buddy Rich	Burning for Buddy: A Tribute to the Music of Buddy Rich	
1995	Poe	Hello	
1995	Glenn Hughes	Feel	
1996	Teddy Andreadis	Innocent Loser	
1997	Sammy Hagar	Marching to Mars	
1999	Glenn Hughes	The Way It Is	
2000	Milkweed	Milkweed	
2001	Mr. Big	Actual Size	
2001	T-Square	Truth 21c	
2001	Haven	The Road	
2002	Haven	Haven	
2005	Tommy Lee	Tommyland: The Ride	
2006	ApologetiX	Wordplay	
2006	Stevie Salas	Be What It Is	
2007	Gina Gershon	In Search of Cleo	
2007	Circus Diablo	Circus Diablo	
2008	Sammy Hagar	Cosmic Universal Fashion	
2009	Drive A	Loss Of Desire	
2009	Macy Gray	The Sellout	
2011	Atif Aslam	The Dreamer Awakes	
2018	Billy Gibbons	The Big Bad Blues	
2021	Billy Gibbons	Hardware	
2022	Stefanie Joosten	Singing to the Sky	
2025	Thomas Raggi	MASQUERADE	
