= Fernandes Guitars =

Japanese musical instrument manufacturer

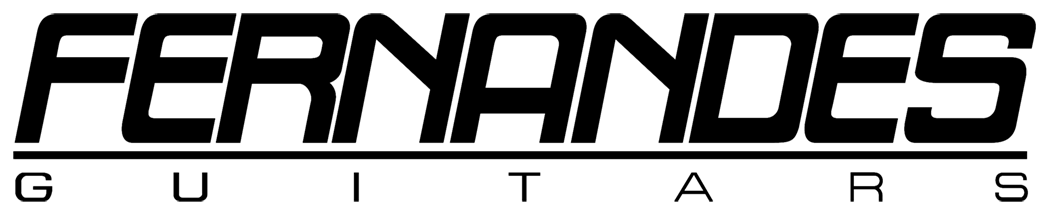
- Type: Private
- Industry: Musical instrument
- Founded: February 25, 1969; 57 years ago
- Headquarters: Niizo, Saitama Prefecture, Japan
- Area served: Worldwide
- Key people: Akira Iijima
- Products: Electric guitars, bass guitars, guitar picks, and amplifiers
- Subsidiaries: Burny
- Website: fernandes.co.jp

Fernandes Guitars was a guitar brand of Japanese marketing company Fernandes Electric Sound Research Group Co. Ltd. (1969-2024) It was one of two guitar brands belonging to the company, the other being Burny Guitars which were Gibson guitar replicas.

== Overview ==
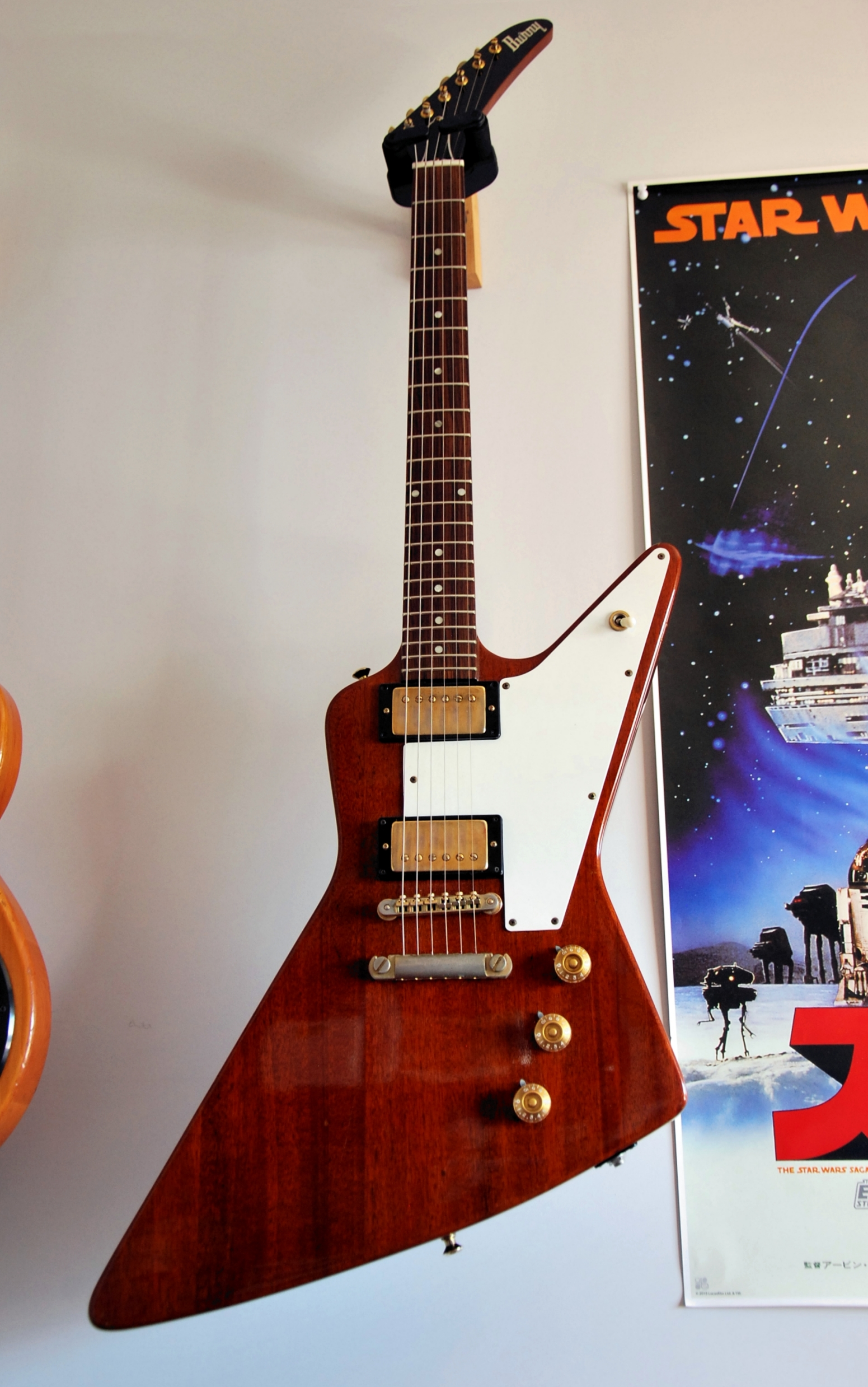
1981 Burny

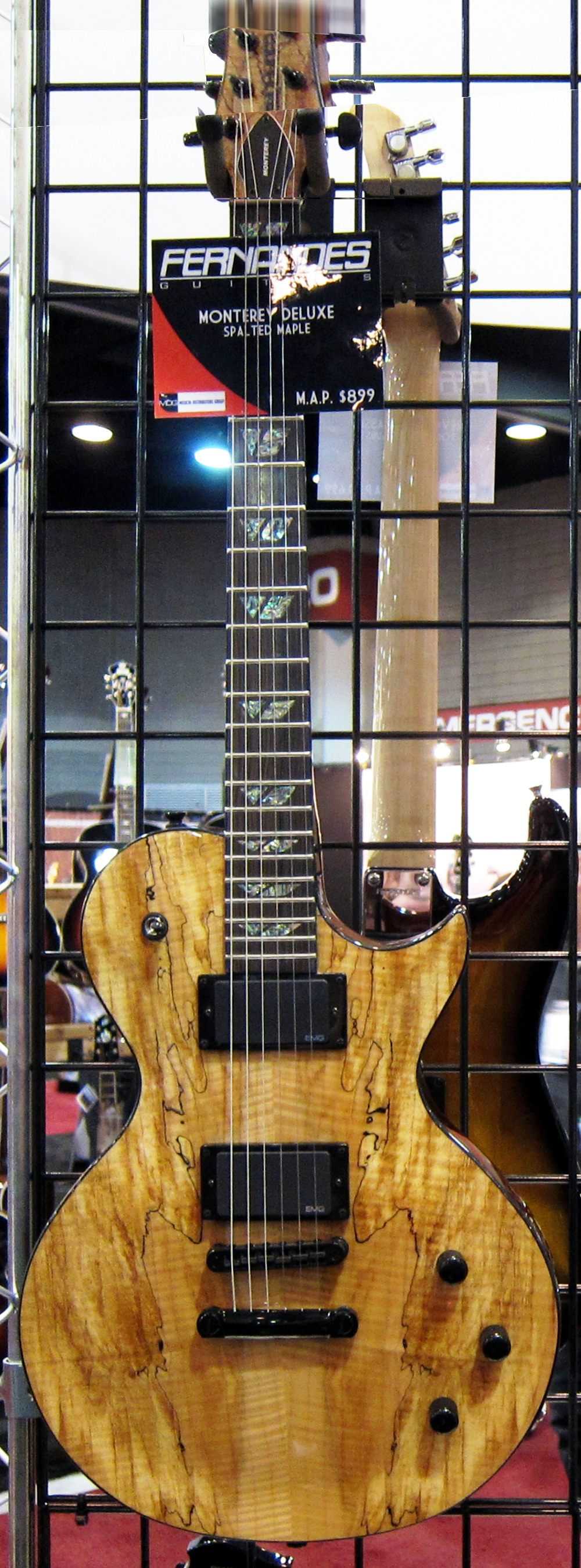
Monterey Deluxe

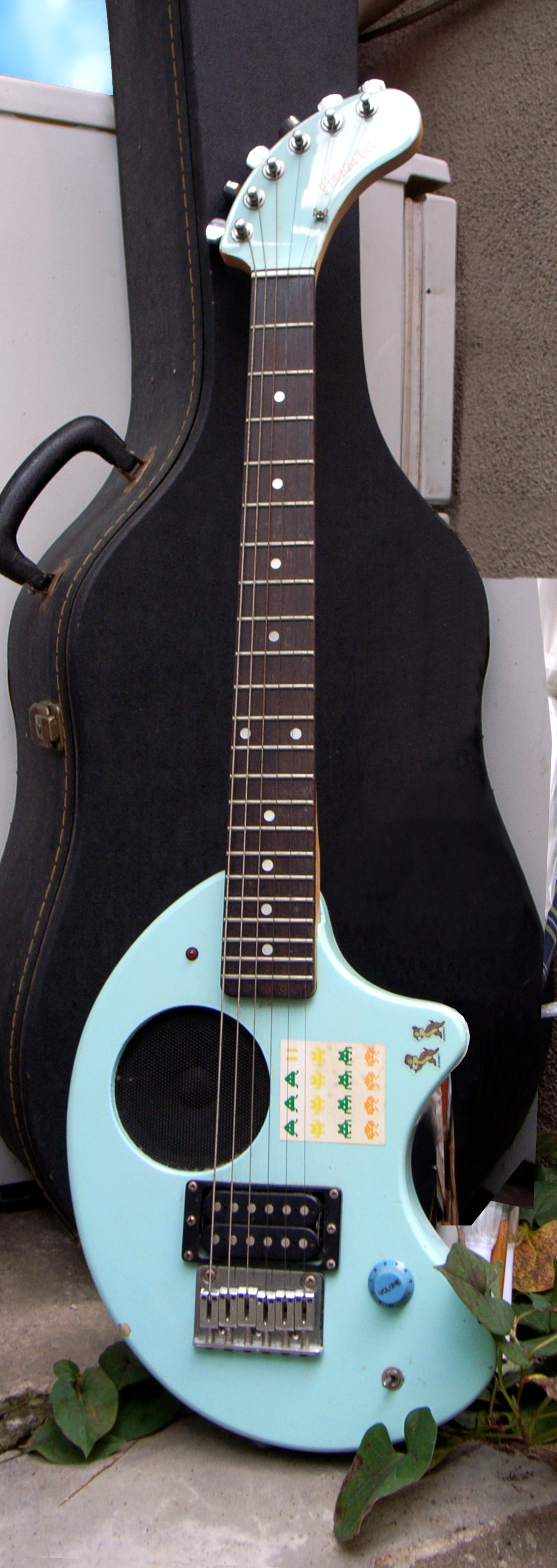
ZO-3

Despite its high production figures, Fernandes is better known in the United States for its Sustainer system, which uses electromagnetism to vibrate a string for an extended period, so long as the user continues to fret a note. Unlike the similar manual EBow sustainer, the Fernandes Sustainer can be used with a standard plectrum, because the sustainer is embedded in the body of guitar. Fernandes' custom shop has installed numerous Sustainers into guitars built by other manufacturers.

Also, Fernandes produced the SB-3000 "Brad Gillis" Fernandes Booster, basically active preamp (9V) gain, which is installed instead of standard output jack plate. It was standard on Fernandes Brad Gillis Signature Model ST-120BG superstrat guitars made in 1985–1987.

Fernandes continued to manufacture guitars that cover the range from inexpensive starter models to custom instruments. In 2000, Fernandes made a guitar to promote the video game Um Jammer Lammy, similar to Lammy's guitars.

== History ==
Its parent company originated in 1969 as Saito Musical Instruments before changing its name to Fernandes Co. Ltd. in 1972. At the same time, it established Osaka Fernandes Co. Ltd. as a separate legal entity to handle wholesale, distribution, and sales support, while the parent company focused on design, licensing deals with artists, and OEM management.

The company started as a distributor of flamenco guitars sub-contracting to Japanese factories to build them. As the company grew, it expanded production to include electric guitars, bass guitars, amplifiers, and accessories to become one of the biggest guitar producers in Japan. Early manufacturing was done by Kawai Gakki who had guitar building experience from their acquisition of Teisco in 1967. Other major Japanese manufacturers have built guitars for Fernandes under original equipment manufacturer (OEM) arrangements, including Matsumoku, Dyna Gakki, and Tōkai Gakki. From the late 1980s, lower-spec guitars were also been built in Korea and then China since the 2000s.

Fernandes’ production arrangements were not limited to models listed in its standard catalogues. The company’s manufacturing and distribution network also allowed for specially commissioned or retailer-exclusive models, although the availability and specifications of such instruments varied by model and market.

=== Floyd Rose Contract ===
From 1981 to 1983, Fernandes supplied genuine Floyd Rose tremolo systems under contract to Floyd Rose in the United States. Rose and Fernandes representatives first met at the 1981 NAMM Show. Shortly after, they struck a deal for Fernandes to mass-produce Rose's double-locking tremolo system which he had been manufacturing himself since 1978. From the end of 1981 Fernandes supplied parts and complete units, including the first fine-tuner prototype developed with input from Eddie Van Halen, with Gotoh in Japan believed to have been an early OEM manufacturer. After Rose partnered with Kramer Guitars in 1983, Fernandes was sidelined by Kramer in favor of Schaller GmbH in Germany and Fernandes' production was then relegated to Japan only. From late 1983 onwards, only Schaller-made Floyd Rose products were used in Kramer guitars for the U.S. and international markets, including Kramer guitars made in Japan that were exported. By this time two Floyd Rose products were available: the original non-fine-tuner tremolo, and the final "whale tail" double-locking tremolo with fine tuners.

The contract with Floyd Rose ended some time in 1985, and Fernandes continued to produce its own version of the double-locking unit with fine tuners and a string-through variant called the "Head Crasher", which were fitted to select Fernandes‑branded superstrat, Explorer, and Flying V models.

Post-contract, Fernandes introduced its own proprietary variations, expanding its offerings and rebranding the entire range to “Head Crasher Tremolo System” and later “FRT Tremolo System.” These systems incorporated Floyd-inspired features such as fine tuners and locking saddles, alongside unique design elements like straight knife edges, saddle height adjustment, and eventually horizontal fine tuners. From 1997 onward, Fernandes discontinued its own products and adopted licensed Floyd Rose tremolos manufactured by Takeuchi, Gotoh, and Ping Well for its guitars.

=== International Expansion ===
Fernandes opened a U.S. office in Los Angeles in 1992 and established a Custom Shop in 1996. The Custom Shop closed in 2014, marking the company’s gradual withdrawal from the American market.

=== P-PROJECT ===
Fernandes developed P-PROJECT as a premium guitar and bass initiative in 1988, bringing in a specialist Japanese luthier, Yatsuse Saijo (西條八兄, also associated with the later Saijo Guitars brand.) By 1996, P-PROJECT had become a distinct premium sub-brand, with instruments typically priced at several times the cost of standard Fernandes models. The initiative also encompassed customisation of existing instruments. In 1998, a dealer-ordered customisation system allowed customers to specify selected changes, including pickups, tremolo systems, installation of the Fernandes Sustainer, and body and neck colours. Typical production lead times were approximately three to four months. In 2000, Fernandes introduced the P-PROJECT Pro Spec Line, comprising two guitars and one bass based on existing FR, ARS and FSB production models with additional specifications.

=== Burny Custom Shop ===
Burny was introduced in the 1970s as the sister brand of Fernandes, focusing on Gibson‑style replicas such as the Les Paul and SG. In the mid‑1990s Fernandes established the Burny Custom Shop in Japan, producing limited‑run, high‑spec instruments that emphasized traditional construction and vintage‑correct hardware. Burny guitars had already gained recognition in the 1970s and 1980s for their accuracy and craftsmanship, with early production handled by Japanese factories including Matsumoku and Tokai and later Dyna and Fujigen from the late 1980s. The Burny Les Paul “Super Grade” models, introduced in the mid‑1970s, became especially collectible and were widely regarded as among the best Japanese Gibson‑style replicas.

While entry‑level Burny production also shifted production to Korea as did Fernandes in the early 1990s and later to China in the 2000s, the Japan Custom Shop remained the flagship for high‑end instruments. These Custom Shop guitars emphasized traditional construction, vintage‑correct hardware, and domestic exclusivity, distinguishing them from mass‑produced Burny lines.

=== Bankruptcy ===
The growing second-hand market and intensifying competition adversely affected sales, and the company reported debts of 434 million yen for the year ending January 2024. On 11 July 2024, Fernandes ceased operations and filed for bankruptcy.

== Musicians using Fernandes ==
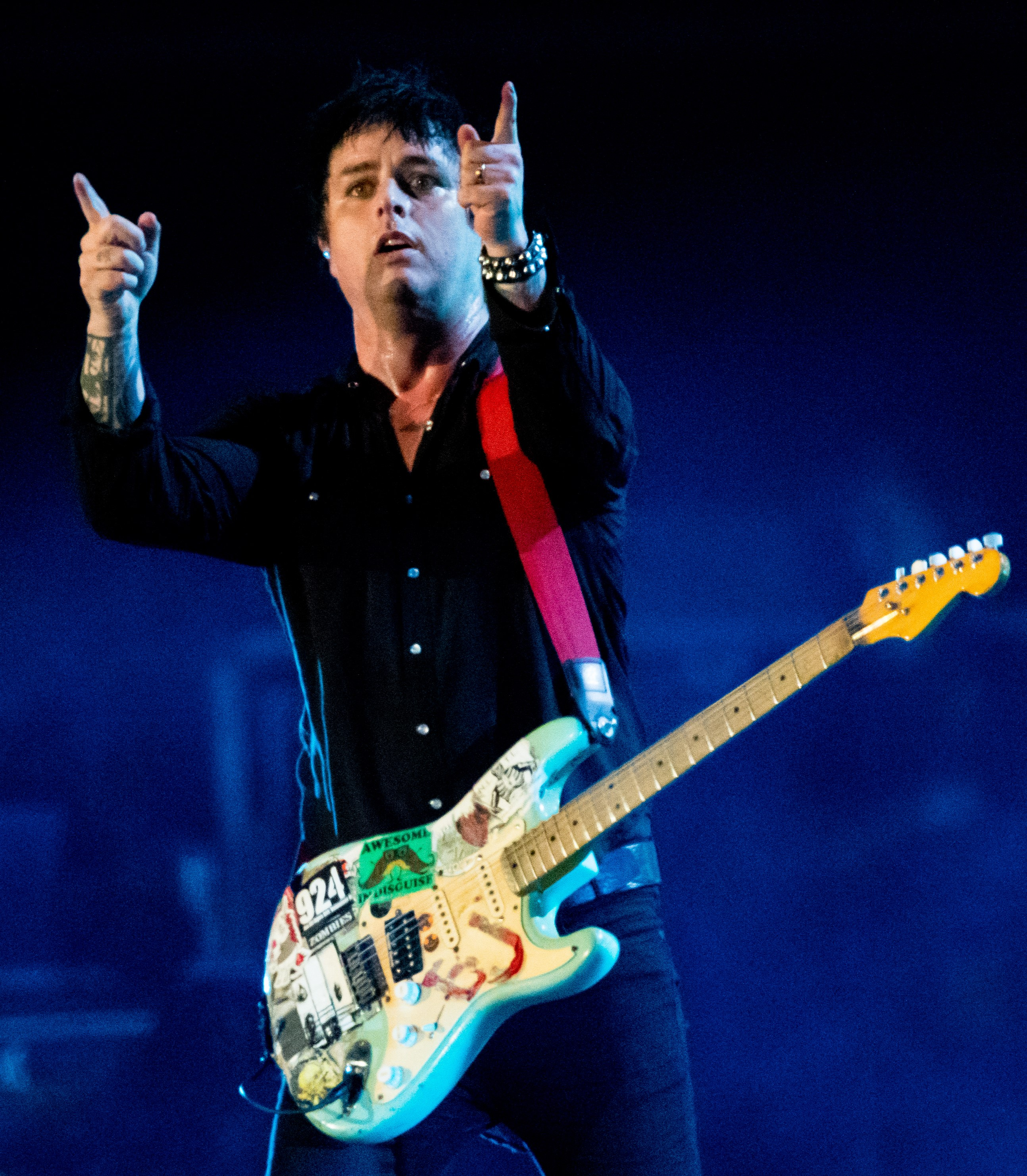
Billie Joe Armstrong of Green Day with his Fernandes The Revival RST-80 nicknamed "Blue" in 2022

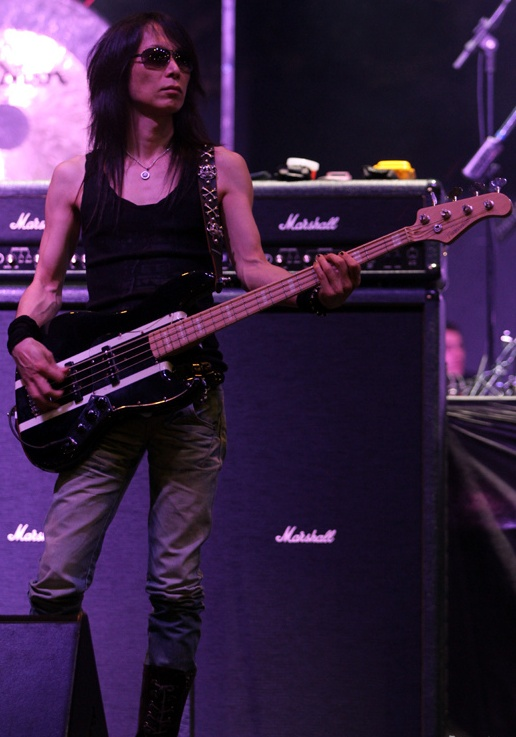
Heath of X Japan with his signature Fernandes bass guitar in 2011

- Billie Joe Armstrong of American punk rock band Green Day had a Fernandes The Revival RST-80 Stratocaster since he was 10 named "Blue" from his mother, and has played it live for nearly every show he has played, near exclusively used for all songs in Eb tuning.
- Tony Campos of American bands Static-X, Fear Factory, and Asesino, has his own signature model Tremor 5 Deluxe and Tremor 5X.
- Ryan Clark of American band Training for Utopia used a Fernandes WS-500, and endorsed the brand on the inside cover of the 1998 Split ep.
- Kurt Cobain of American grunge rock group Nirvana used a Fernandes Stratocaster neck on a Japanese Fender Stratocaster body during their live performance at the Paramount
- Billy Corgan of American rock band Smashing Pumpkins used a Fernandes Decade during the band's Adore era. It was used specifically for the sustainiac pickup which was used frequently on the album and on tour.
- The Edge of Irish rock band U2 has started using a Retro Rocket and Native Pro guitar with Sustainer to play With or Without You when playing live.
- Kasper Eistrup of Danish rock band Kashmir has used a Fernandes Telecaster with a Fernandes Sustainer kit for several years, and has since acquired another black Fernandes Telecaster.
- John Flansburgh of American rock band They Might Be Giants used a Fernandes The Revival RST-50 Stratocaster for most of the songs on Lincoln as well as in concerts from the band's early era.
- Tobias Forge of Swedish rock band Ghost.
- Robert Fripp of English progressive rock band King Crimson used a modified Les Paul styled Fernandes Goldtop Custom including a Seymour Duncan bridge pickup with it along with other Fernandes custom models, he often used one of them for the band along with his wife, Toyah Willcox to perform together.
- Brad Gillis of American rock band Night Ranger and former Ozzy Osbourne guitarist had his own stratocaster-type model that was red with a black pick guard. Gillis still uses his Fernandes guitar as his main guitar when he performs in concert with Night Ranger. Fernandes made Brad Gillis Signature Model ST-120BG superstrat guitar, with SB-3000 Booster (active preamp) and Fernandes VS-1 and VH-2B pickups.
- Steve Hackett, formerly of English bands Genesis and GTR, has used Burny guitars with sustainer units (one black and one gold) on studio recordings since his 1999 Darktown album and live since his 1996 Tokyo Tapes shows. They have since replaced his previous stock Les Paul guitars as his electric guitar of choice for every album and live show since then.
- Kirk Hammett of American heavy metal band Metallica used a Fernandes Stratocaster, seemingly an EMG equipped FST-135 nicknamed "Edna", for clean parts on some of the early Metallica albums such as Ride the Lightning as well as live on early tours. He also used a customized red 1985 FST-65 with a CS Style 22F wood neck option.
- Heath of Japanese heavy metal band X Japan used his signature Fernandes FJB-115H model bass guitar almost exclusively. Previously he used several Burny guitars, including his signature model DB-85H.
- Hide of Japanese heavy metal band X Japan used Fernandes guitars almost exclusively. He has numerous signature models with the company. His most famous ones imitate the body style of a B.C. Rich Mockingbird.
- Hidehiko Hoshino of Japanese rock band Buck-Tick uses Fernandes guitars almost exclusively. He has had several signature models with the company.
- Tomoyasu Hotei of Boøwy and solo fame was one of the leading artists to front Fernandes from the mid-80s onwards. His most iconic is the TEJ, with a Telecaster body, Concorde headstock, EMG pickups, and geometric paint job.
- Hisashi Imai of Japanese rock band Buck-Tick uses Fernandes guitars almost exclusively. He has several signature models with the company, many of which have unusual designs. Examples of his innovative ideas include the incorporation of a theremin in his guitars, and his Stabilizer model featuring a stabilizer connecting the head and body with a thickness equivalent to the neck.
- Ken of Japanese rock band L'Arc-en-Ciel had a number of Fernandes signature guitars from 1995 to around 2003. The two most notable models were the white LA-80KK HSS and the red LA-85KK HSS Super Strats 6 string electric guitars. Both had 24 fret, 25.5" scale bolt on necks and reverse headstocks. The white LA-80KK featured a DiMarzio Tone Zone 17.0k humbucking pickup in the bridge position with Fernandes single coil pickups in the middle and neck positions. The LA-85KK had all Fernandes pickups in them. Both have a single volume knob and a toggle switch that splits the coils in the bridge humbucker to a single coil. Both guitars feature gold hardware. The bridges are Fernandes Licensed Floyd Rose locking type with locking nuts. The neck truss rod adjustment nut is located in the heel of the neck and requires the neck to be removed for adjustment. Both guitars feature an inlaid gecko at the 12th fret.
- Dave Kushner of American rock bands Velvet Revolver, Wasted Youth, and DKFXP uses Fernandes Ravelle Signature guitar.
- Neal Schon of American rock band Journey used the sustainer system in Fernandes guitars, Aria Pro II guitars, and eventually in his black Les Paul (replacing the neck P90), as well as his own production models. Many of his famous leads, such as "Send Her My Love", are examples of the sustainer system's abilities.
- Andy Sneap and Neil Watson of English thrash metal band Sabbat played matching white Fernandes JS-85 guitars with sharkfin inlays (modelled on Jackson's Rhoads V) for their live performance in East Berlin in 1990 that was recorded and released on video as The End of the Beginning.
- Robert Trujillo of American heavy metal band Metallica has been seen using a variety of Fernandes basses, mainly 5-string neck-thru types appearing to be based on the "Gravity Deluxe" production model. Allegedly, Rob's personally owned Fernandes basses were custom made by either the Fernandes North Hollywood and/or Japanese custom shops. The specifications and complete history of Rob's personally owned and stage-played Fernandes basses by most accounts is still a mystery.
- You of Japanese hard rock band Dead End had his own signature model with Fernandes.
