= Matt Sorum =

American drummer (born 1960)

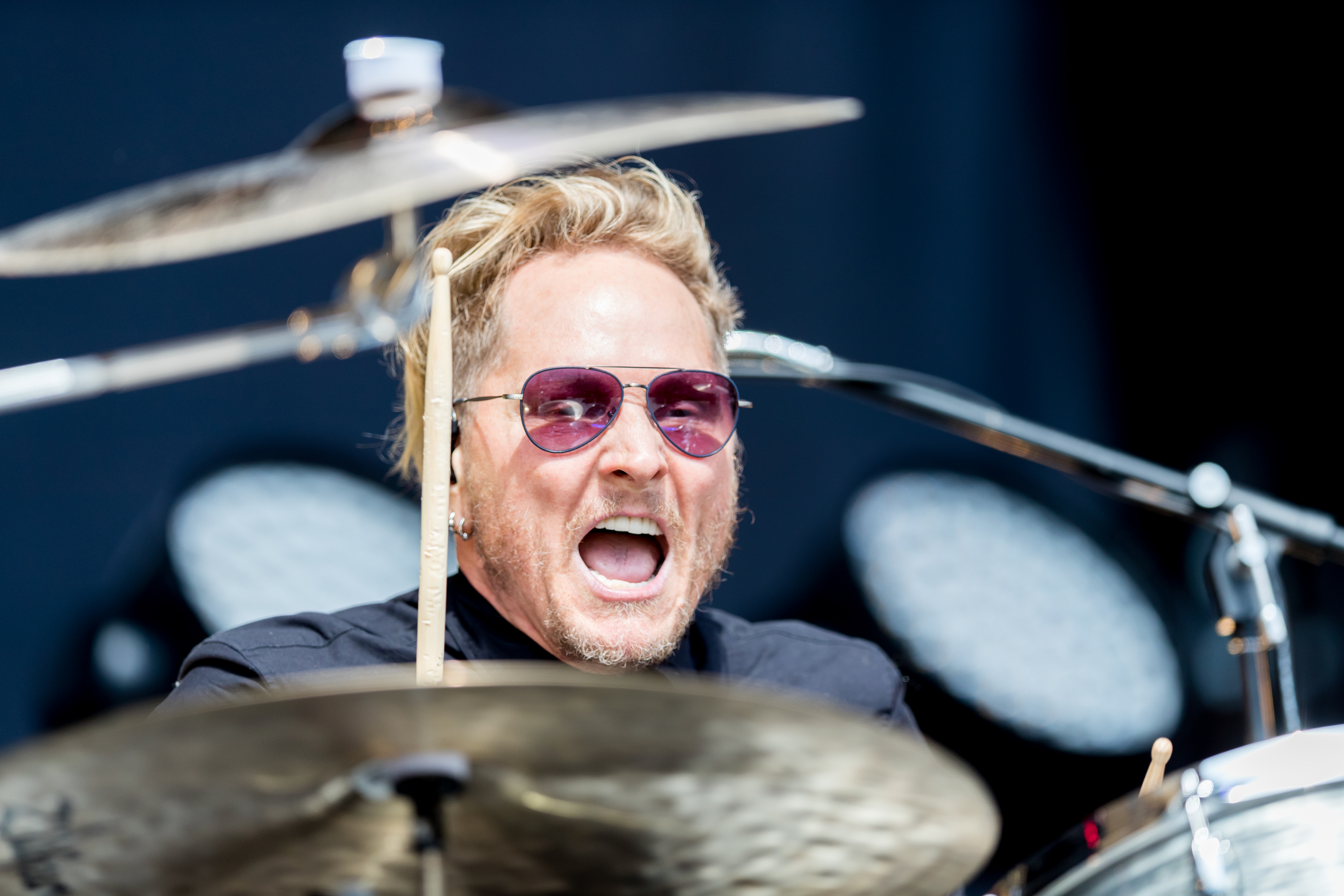
- Sorum with Deadland Ritual in 2019

Background information
- Born: Matthew William Sorum; November 19, 1960 (age 65); Mission Viejo, California, U.S.
- Genres: Hard rock; heavy metal; blues rock; alternative rock
- Occupation: Drummer
- Instruments: Drums; vocals
- Years active: 1975–present
- Member of: Kings of Chaos, Billy Gibbons
- Formerly of: Guns N' Roses; Velvet Revolver; The Cult; Camp Freddy; Neurotic Outsiders; Slash's Snakepit; Hawk; Y Kant Tori Read; Johnny Crash; Hollywood Vampires; Power Rangers Orchestra; Deadland Ritual; Tak Matsumoto Group

Matthew William Sorum (born November 19, 1960) is an American drummer. He is best known as both a former member of the hard rock band Guns N' Roses, with whom he recorded three studio albums, and as a member of the supergroup Velvet Revolver. Sorum has toured and recorded with Billy Gibbons, is a member of the touring project Kings of Chaos, and is a former member of both The Cult and Y Kant Tori Read. Sorum was also a member of Guns N' Roses side projects, Slash's Snakepit and Neurotic Outsiders, and has released two solo albums, Hollywood Zen (2004) and Stratosphere (2014). He was the touring drummer for the supergroup Hollywood Vampires from 2015 to 2017. His recent project was Deadland Ritual, featuring Black Sabbath bassist Geezer Butler, Billy Idol guitarist Steve Stevens, and Apocalyptica vocalist Franky Perez.

After performing on Tori Amos' first record and synthpop band Y Kant Tori Read's solo album, Sorum joined the Cult in 1989 to tour in support of their fourth studio album, Sonic Temple (1989). During the tour, Sorum was spotted by Guns N' Roses guitarist Slash and subsequently replaced their drummer Steven Adler in 1990. Remaining in the band for seven years, Sorum recorded the albums Use Your Illusion I (1991), Use Your Illusion II (1991), and "The Spaghetti Incident?" (1993), before departing in 1997 following an argument with Axl Rose.

In 1999, Sorum rejoined The Cult to perform on their reunion album, Beyond Good and Evil (2001), and its subsequent 2000/2001 tours, and subsequently co-founded the hard rock supergroup Velvet Revolver, alongside former Guns N' Roses bandmates Slash and Duff McKagan. The band, which included guitarist Dave Kushner and Stone Temple Pilots frontman Scott Weiland, released two successful studio albums, Contraband (2004) and Libertad (2007), before entering an extended hiatus following Weiland's departure.

Sorum has been a permanent member of hard rock cover band Camp Freddy since 2003, alongside Jane's Addiction members Dave Navarro and Chris Chaney, and assisted in hosting its radio show and podcast on Indie 103.1. In 2012, Sorum founded a touring project, entitled Kings of Chaos, featuring members of Guns N' Roses, Deep Purple, Def Leppard, Aerosmith, ZZ Top, Cheap Trick and Slipknot.

In 2012, Sorum was inducted into the Rock and Roll Hall of Fame as a member of Guns N' Roses.

== Career ==
=== 1960–1989: Early career ===
Sorum was born Matthew William Sorum on November 19, 1960, in an unincorporated area of Orange County, California, that later became the city of Mission Viejo. He started to play drums after watching Ringo Starr with The Beatles on The Ed Sullivan Show in 1964. Later he was mainly influenced by Ian Paice, Keith Moon, Neil Peart, Ginger Baker, John Bonham, Roger Taylor, Buddy Rich and Bill Ward.

At Mission Viejo High School Sorum was part of the jazz band, marching band, and wind ensemble. According to Sorum, he and his high school band, Prophecy, would play at The Starwood on amateur nights.

Sorum's work with Chateau produced a four-song set that was covered by local radio stations for a short time, but the music scene changed from grandiose rock to punk and alternative new wave music. Sorum left and went to Hollywood to play with a series of bands, including Population Five, with bassist Prescott Niles from The Knack, and Hawk, replacing Scott Travis, who went to play with Racer X and later Judas Priest. He then left on a tour around the country with a blues guitarist, playing nightclubs and bars.

In 1988, he was recruited to play on the debut album of Y Kant Tori Read, a band fronted by a then unknown Tori Amos. In the wake of that project, he joined The Cult as their live drummer for the 1989/1990 tour in support of Sonic Temple.

=== 1990–1997: Guns N' Roses, Slash's Snakepit and Neurotic Outsiders. ===
In 1989, Slash saw Sorum live with The Cult on the Sonic Temple tour and, shortly after, Sorum joined Guns N' Roses as Steven Adler's replacement.

Sorum with Guns N' Roses can be heard on the 1990 cover of the Bob Dylan track "Knockin' on Heaven's Door", the albums Use Your Illusion I, Use Your Illusion II (excluding the track "Civil War"), "The Spaghetti Incident?", the 1994 cover of The Rolling Stones track "Sympathy for the Devil" and the majority of Live Era: '87-'93. Sorum featured fully on the lengthy Use Your Illusion Tour, drumming on all of the 194 shows, 9 legs and to over 7 million fans.

In 1994, Sorum formed Slash's Snakepit with Slash and Gilby Clarke and drummed on their debut album, It's Five O'Clock Somewhere. Sorum also lent his drumming skills to the theme song for the 1995 20th Century Fox film Mighty Morphin Power Rangers: The Movie. That same year, Sorum formed the supergroup Neurotic Outsiders, which featured bandmate Duff McKagan. In 1996 they released their only album, the self-titled Neurotic Outsiders. John Taylor (Duran Duran) and Steve Jones (Sex Pistols) also participated on this album, and toured behind it. Early performances featured guest spots by Simon Le Bon (Duran Duran), Slash, and Billy Idol.

In 1997, Sorum was fired from Guns N' Roses by Axl Rose after an argument with Rose over the inclusion of Paul Tobias in the band. Sorum claimed that Tobias made disparaging remarks about a Slash performance on TV, resulting in him blowing up at Tobias. Slash had recently left the band, and Sorum told Axl "without Slash there is no Guns N' Roses", to which Rose asked if he was going to quit the band. Sorum said no, then Rose fired him. Sorum had said he went into the studio that night intending to get fired, and was glad he quit since the band was "stagnant", not recording music in four years.

In April 2006, nine years after leaving Guns N' Roses, Sorum re-established his friendship with the band's lead singer Axl Rose.

=== 1998–2008: Return to The Cult and Velvet Revolver era ===
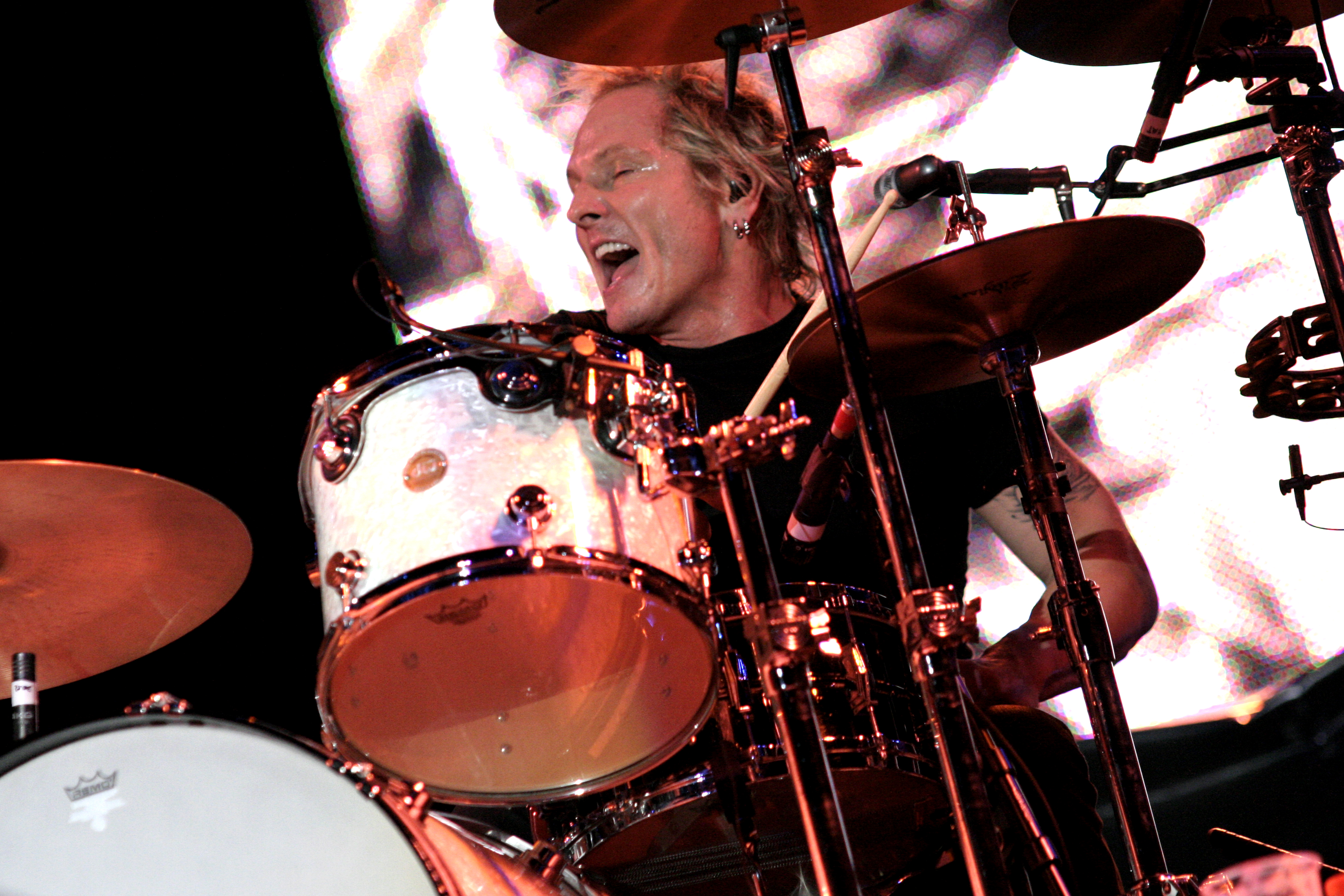
Sorum performing with Velvet Revolver in 2007

In 1998, he released his first and only drum instructional video (Drum Licks and Tricks from the Rock n Roll Jungle) demonstrating his techniques. In 1999, Matt joined The Cult once again and featured on their album Beyond Good And Evil, which he spent most of 2001 touring in support of.

In 1999, Sorum reunited with Slash and McKagan to promote a concert for the independent film Soundman (written and directed by Steven Ho) at the Slamdance Film Festival. Sorum had composed the film with Lanny Cordola and Michael Stearns. Realizing that they still had chemistry together, they formed a new band called Velvet Revolver with former Stone Temple Pilots frontman Scott Weiland and rhythm guitarist Dave Kushner. After the 2004 release of their debut album, Contraband, they embarked on a worldwide tour that continued through December 2005. In August 2005, Sorum broke his wrist in a boating accident, stalling the tour temporarily. While recovering from the wrist injury the drummer Brian Tichy and Mark Schulman filled in for him. In 2005, the band was nominated for three Grammys, Rock Album of the Year, Rock Song, and Hard Rock Performance for their Contraband single "Slither", which won their first and only Grammy.

After taking some time off in 2006, Sorum and the rest of the band returned to the studio in December to record Libertad, Velvet Revolver's second album, which was released on July 3, 2007. Sorum toured with Velvet Revolver until Weiland parted ways with the band on April 1, 2008.

=== Other ventures ===
In 1994, Sorum was one of many guest drummers on the album Burning for Buddy: A Tribute to the Music of Buddy Rich.

Sorum released his first solo album, Hollywood Zen, in 2003. In the same year, Sorum began playing with the newly formed Camp Freddy.

Sorum has endorsed Zildjian cymbals, featured in numerous sweepstakes with Zildjian, and lent his talents to Submersible Music's DrumCore software.

In 2006, Sorum began guest recording in his studio with a new project, called Circus Diablo. That year, he launched a clothing line, SorumNoce.

On June 4, 2008, Sorum revealed Camp Freddy is working on an album.

Sorum was featured in episode 54 of TV's LA Ink originally airing on August 27, 2009. In it, Kat Von D. tattoos a portrait of his wife Ace on his leg.

Matt filled in on Motörhead's 2009 US tour, while drummer Mikkey Dee took part in Kändisdjungeln, a Swedish version of I'm a Celebrity...Get Me Out of Here!.

After performing together at the Giving 2010 benefit event on May 3, 2010, Sorum formed the cover band Carnival of Dogs with Tracii Guns (L.A. Guns, formerly of Brides of Destruction), Franky Perez (Solo, Scars on Broadway, DKFXP) and Phil Soussan (previously played with Ozzy Osbourne, Billy Idol and Vince Neil).

He made an appearance in an episode of FSN Sport Science, when a test was undertaken to determine if a professional basketball point guard had faster hands than a drummer.

In 2010 and 2011 Sorum appeared on the reality show Rock 'n Roll Fantasy Camp. He appeared as one of the counselors guiding a new band in a music competition.

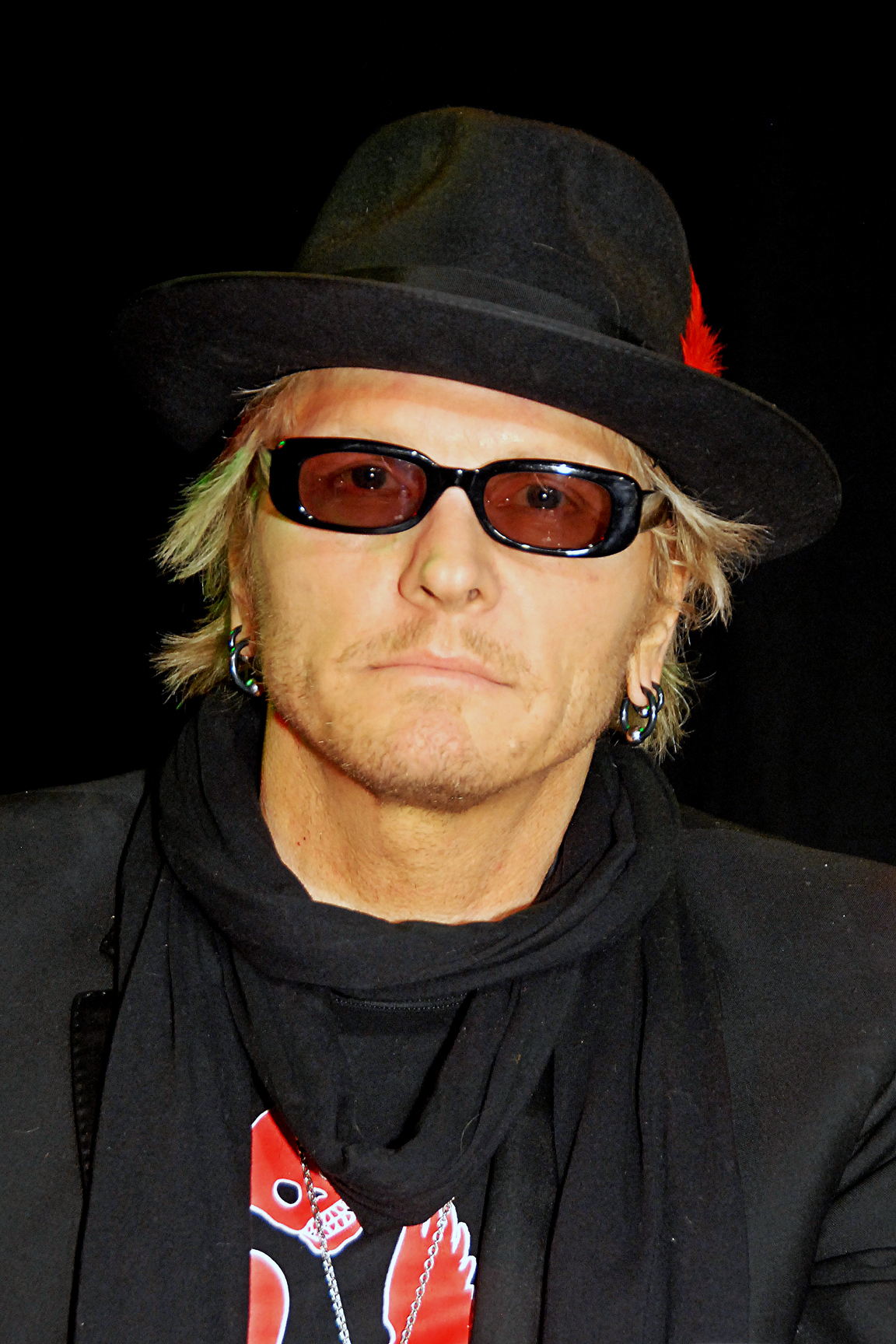
Sorum in 2012.

In 2012, Sorum and Ace Harper formed the band Diamond Baby and are both featured in the music video "The Last Rockstar" with actresses Jane Lynch, Juliette Lewis, and the late Verne Troyer. In 2012, Sorum and Jane Lynch created Adopt the Arts to save the arts from being eliminated from Los Angeles elementary schools.

In 2014, he worked with Animals Asia and adopted a moon bear that had been on a Chinese bear-bile farm, when her bile was extracted for traditional medicine. He has since become an ambassador for the cause.

Sorum is also an auxiliary member of the Cooper-fronted rock supergroup Hollywood Vampires, appearing on the band's eponymous 2015 debut studio album and playing drums at the band's Rock in Rio show on September 24, 2015, as well as preceding warm-up shows at The Roxy on September 16 and 17. Sorum played with the Hollywood Vampires during their February 2016 Grammy Award Performance.

In 2018, Sorum unveiled Artbit, a distributed-ledger platform that enables both artists and fans to share and monetise artistic talent from anywhere across the globe.

== Personal life ==
On October 12, 2013, Sorum married his longtime girlfriend Ace Harper in Palm Springs, California. Their daughter was born on June 11, 2021.

In a 2014 interview, Sorum stated that he became a vegetarian.

== Discography ==
Studio albums

- Hollywood Zen (2004)
- Stratosphere (2014)
