= Hisss =

2010 Indian film by Jennifer Lynch

- Theatrical release poster
- Directed by: Jennifer Lynch
- Written by: Jennifer Lynch
- Produced by: Govind Menon; Vikram Singh; Ratan Jain; William Sees Keenan
- Starring: Mallika Sherawat; Divya Dutta; Irrfan Khan; Jeff Doucette
- Cinematography: Madhu Ambat
- Edited by: Tony Ciccone
- Music by: Anu Malik
- Production company: Venus Movies
- Distributed by: Media Distribution Partners
- Release date: 22 October 2010 (India)
- Running time: 98 minutes
- Countries: United States; India
- Languages: English; Hindi
- Budget: $15 million

Hisss (also known as Nagin: The Snake Woman) is a 2010 adventure-horror film directed by Jennifer Lynch. It stars Mallika Sherawat who plays the lead role of the Nagin, with Irrfan Khan, Divya Dutta, and Jeff Doucette.

== Plot ==
In Natchi, a small town in the Indian state of Kerala, George States has last stage brain cancer and only six months to live. To prevent death and gain immortality, he decides to extract the nagmani, immortal blood from a nagin, a shape-shifting cobra that can change into a human. He and hired henchmen capture the nag (the male snake) so that the nagin (the female) comes after the capturer to free her mate, thus allowing him to obtain the nagmani by force. He keeps the nag in a glass box where he electrocutes and tortures him. His plan works and the nagin starts following them.

The nagin transforms into a beautiful woman and is later helped by police inspector Vikram Gupta and his wife Maya, who is infertile, causing a strain in their relationship. The nagin helps a few women: one who is beaten mercilessly by her husband; one being raped by a man, and so on. She even protects herself when two men try to rape her. She turns into a giant cobra and brutally kills those two men, some of George's henchmen who were involved in the capture of her mate as well as men who torture women. She turns back into a human after her killings. Inspector Gupta tries to help the nagin find her mate but at the same time, tries to investigate the murders, unaware she is responsible for them. Finally, Nagin reaches George's hideout where she reclaims her mate and they have sex, leading her to become pregnant. George attempts to capture the nagin during intercourse since this is when she will be most vulnerable.

Wearing a suit that hides his heat signature, Gerge lures the nagin by using her dying mate as bait for a trap. He captures her and tries taking the nagmani but at that moment, Inspector Gupta arrives and helps her. Angered by the death of her mate at the hands of George, the nagin turns into a half snake, half human hybrid and throws him in the glass box where her mate was kept and electrocutes him to death. She leaves the hideout, carrying her dead mate. Inspector Gupta is amazed at everything he has just witnessed. He returns to his wife Maya, who later gives birth to their baby, while the nagin, back in the form of a beautiful woman, watches over the nest of eggs she has laid, which hatch into numerous baby cobras.

== Cast ==
- Mallika Sherawat as Nagin
- Irrfan Khan as Inspector Vikram Gupta
- Jeff Doucette as George States
- Divya Dutta as Maya Gupta
- Raman Trikha as Navin
- Tony Ciccone as Narrator

== Production ==
The film was shot simultaneously in English and Hindi. Famed special effects designer Robert Kurtzman was responsible for developing the look of the Snake Woman. Hisss was shot in the jungles of Kerala, India. It was also shot in Mumbai, Chennai, Madh Island and in the studios of Filmistan. The film was edited by American Tony Ciccone, who is also credited with additional sound design. Mooppan Raghavan, tribal leader of the Thalikakal settlement in Kerala and over a dozen members of his tribe were recruited as extras. A documentary, titled Despite The Gods, about director Jennifer Lynch's struggle to make the film, was released in 2012.

== Music ==
Hisss

Soundtrack album by Anu Malik, David Kushner, Franky Perez, Julian Lennon, Mark Sipro, Peter-John Vettese, Shraddha Pandit, Panjabi MC
- Released: 1 October 2010
- Genre: Feature film soundtrack
- Length: 46:37
- Label: Venus

Anu Malik chronology
| Teree Sang (2009) | Hisss (2010) | Toonpur Ka Super Hero (2010) |

Anu Malik composed the on-camera songs for the film. Alexander von Bubenheim composed the original score. The soundtrack consists of six original recordings, composed by Anu Malik, David Kushner, Panjabi MC, Alexander Von Bubenheim, Salim–Sulaiman and Julian Lennon, with lyrics penned by Sameer, Shruti Haasan, Mallika Sherawat, Shweta Pandit, Shraddha Pandit and Sayeed Quadri. The soundtrack also featured hit songs from the films Robot and De Dana Dan. Mallika Sherawat makes her musical debut on the soundtrack alongside Julian Lennon.rl=http://in.movies.yahoo.com/news-detail/99314/Mallika-Sherawat-makes-singing-debut-Hisss.html|title=Mallika Sherawat makes singing debut with 'Hisss'|website=yahoo.com}}</ref> Shruti Haasan sings and appears in a promotional video with music by Dave Kushner. The music supervisor for the film, Marcus Barone, co-produced the soundtrack album for Split Image Soundtracks and Venus Records and Tapes with co-producer of the film William Keenan. Official Bollywood Soundtrack Charts charted "I Got That Poison" performed by Panjabi MC and Shweta Pandit at No. 8 from 24 October 2010 to 5 November 2010.

Hisss (Original Motion Picture Soundtrack)
| No. | Title | Lyrics | Music | Artist(s) | Length |
|---|---|---|---|---|---|
| 1. | "Lagi Lagi Milan Dhun Lagi" (Version 1) | Sameer | Anu Malik | Shreya Ghoshal | 6:05 |
| 2. | "Beyond The Snake" | Shruti Haasan | David Kushner, Franky Perez | Shruti Haasan | 3:11 |
| 3. | "Sway" (Mann Dole) | Mallika Sherawat | Julian Lennon, Mark Sipro, Peter-John Vettese | Mallika Sherawat | 3:32 |
| 4. | "I Got The Poison" (Hisss Remix) | Shweta Pandit | Shraddha Pandit, Panjabi MC | Shweta Pandit | 3:42 |
| 5. | "Lagi Lagi Milan Dhun Lagi" (Version 2) | Sameer | Anu Malik | Sunidhi Chauhan | 6:05 |
| 6. | "Hisss" | Shweta Pandit, Shraddha Pandit | Shraddha Pandit | Shweta Pandit | 2:59 |
| 7. | "Lafanaa" | Sayeed Quadri | Anu Malik | Sunidhi Chauhan | 5:52 |
| 8. | "Naina Miley" (From Robot) | Swanand Kirkire | A. R. Rahman | A. R. Rahman, Suzanne D'Mello, Lady Kash and Krissy | 5:16 |
| 9. | "Rishte Naate" (From De Dana Dan) | Sayeed Quadri | Pritam Chakraborty | Rahat Fateh Ali Khan, Suzanne D'Mello | 4:25 |
| 10. | "Kilimanjaro" (From Robot) | Swanand Kirkire | A. R. Rahman | Javed Ali, Chinmayi | 5:30 |
| Total length: | | | | | 46:37 |

== Release ==
=== Theatrical ===
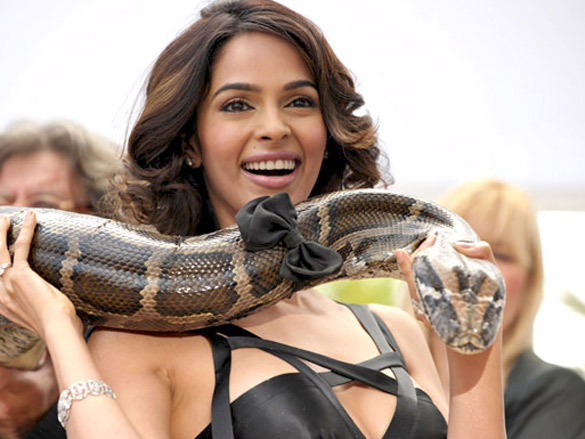
Mallika Sherawat attending Hisss photo call held at Hotel Majestic during 63rd Annual Cannes Film Festival

At the 2010 Cannes Film Festival, Mallika Sherawat promoted Hisss by posing with a 22-foot-long (6.7 m) Burmese python on the red carpet. The film was released in India on 22 October 2010 in Hindi, Tamil and Telugu. The Malayalam version was released on 12 November 2010.

=== Premiere ===
The film was set to premiere at the Montreal Festival du Nouveau Cinéma on 14 October 2010 and at the Gotham Screen Film Festival & Screenplay Contest in New York on 15 October 2010 but was pulled from both festivals shortly before they opened.

== Reception ==
=== Critical response ===
Hisss received highly negative reviews from critics upon release from both domestic and international critics. Nikhat Kazmi of Times of India gave it 2 out of 5 stars and stated, "A film like Hisss should have scored with its special effects. But once again, the carnage that the serpent unleashes is grotesque and her transformation from seductress to venomous reptile is more funny than eyeball-grabbing." Taran Adarsh from Bollywood Hungama gave it 1/2 star out of five and stated that "If there were Razzies in Bollywood, Hisss would win hands down. Films like Hisss make you realize what's going wrong in Bollywood today. On one hand, we celebrate the new stories being told in our films, and on the other, we churn out a Hisss, which is badly scripted, poorly enacted, and carelessly directed. Believe me, it's easy to solve the crossword puzzle in newspapers than it is to understand what exactly is going on in this film. As for director Jennifer Lynch, she needs a crash course in film-making pronto. The visual effects seem straight out of a B-grade Bollywood film. On the whole, Hisss is best avoided."

Rajeev Masand from CNN-IBN gave it 1 star out of five and stated that "In Hisss, directed by Jennifer Lynch, Mallika stars as a shape-shifting snake that has been separated from her reptile lover by a crazy foreigner who's seeking a naagmani that will cure his cancer. The outrageous plot involves this ichchadhari Nagin emerging as something of a feminist superhero who comes to the rescue of various tormented women, even as she's seeking out her kidnapped partner. Irrfan Khan plays the cop investigating a series of mysterious killings, and Divya Dutta plays his wife. At 90 minutes, it's mercifully short, but watch it only if you're not easily disgusted."

Anupama Chopra from NDTV gave it 1.5 stars out of five and stated that "Hisss has marginally better special effects and much more nudity but the script is so deliriously inept that, in comparison, the average Ramsay horror film looks like a class act." Mayank Shekhar from Hindustan Times gave it 1 star out of five and stated that "This is pornography for the hormonally demented teen. Or maybe this is erotica."
