= Hollywood Zen =

Studio album by Matt Sorum
- Released: June 1, 2004
- Recorded: 2003
- Genre: Hard rock; alternative rock
- Length: 45:14
- Label: Brash
- Producer: Matt Sorum; Lanny Cordola

Matt Sorum chronology
Hollywood Zen (2004)	Stratosphere (2014)

Hollywood Zen is Velvet Revolver and ex-Guns N' Roses drummer Matt Sorum's first solo release. It draws on his own experiences with touring, addictions, relationships and his hometown of Los Angeles. Co-produced with Lanny Cordola, and engineered and mixed by Kevin Smith, it features musical appearances by several of Sorum's friends, most notably former Guns N' Roses and Velvet Revolver bandmates Slash and Duff McKagan playing guitar and bass on various tracks. The recording of the album was completed while Velvet Revolver was putting together their finalized line-up.

== Track listing ==
1. "The Forgiving Kind" - 3:27
2. "Hallucination Lullabye" - 4:59
3. "Brand New Obscene" - 2:49
4. "The Blame Game" (featuring Slash & Duff McKagan) - 3:55
5. "Sunset Blvd." - 4:43
6. "Circus of the Sun" - 3:26
7. "3% Solution" - 4:44
8. "Scar Baby" - 5:24
9. "Viva la Rock" - 5:00
10. "Suicide Mission" - 3:52
11. "Confession" (bonus track) - 4:55

== Personnel ==
- Matt Sorum - lead vocals, drums, producer, lyricist
- Chuck Wright - bass, art direction, backing vocals, lyricist
- Lanny Cordola - guitar, lyricist, producer
- Kevin Smith - engineering, mixing

=== Guest musicians ===
- Slash - lead guitar on "The Blame Game"
- Duff McKagan - bass on various tracks
