= DrumCore =

Drum machine software

DrumCore is software by Sonoma Wire Works that lets songwriters and composers create drum tracks using audio loops and/or MIDI beats, fills and variations by world-class drummers across a multitude of styles. It also includes a virtual drum instrument loaded with the drummer's drumkit sounds. It has won Best Drum Software awards from the magazines Electronic Musician and Remix. DrumCore has been used by TV composers for creating music for the Survivor series as well as the drums for a recent Debbie Harry album.

== Features ==
DrumCore 4 was developed for songwriters, composers, musicians and producers. An upgrade to the DrumCore 3 and KitCore 2 plug-in drum instruments, DrumCore 4 (AAX/AU/VST3) now works with many 64-bit recording software programs on Mac and Windows, and includes 24-bit audio loops, MIDI loops, multi-velocity sampled drum kits, groove browser, song timeline, mixer, effects and more. Royalty free recordings of celebrity drummers are provided as tempo-adjustable GrooveSets in a variety of styles. Users can either use the included GrooveSets, or create their own grooves using the included drum kits, which are MIDI-mapped and customizable, making DrumCore easy to use with external controllers.

Famous drummer content

DrumCore includes content by well-known drummers, including: Jeff Anthony (Sheryl Crow), John Bishop (Ernie Watts), Terry Bozzio (Missing Persons), Tony Braunagel (Bonnie Raitt), Luis Conte (Sergio Mendes), Ned Douglas (Dave Stewart), Sly Dunbar (Bob Marley), Michael Shrieve (Santana), Ben Smith (Heart), Matt Sorum (Velvet Revolver), DJ Syze-up (UltraNaté), Alan White (Yes, John Lennon), Lonnie Wilson (Brooks & Dunn), Zoro (Lenny Kravitz) and John Tempesta (Helmet, Testament, Rob Zombie).

Audio and MIDI GrooveSets for songwriting

A drummer plays the equivalent of a song with a basic groove, variations and fills. Then they often (but not always) play the song at multiple tempos that they feel that groove works at. In this way you get the same basic groove at multiple tempos and the performance sounds more realistic than simply using one performance and time stretching it to speed it up or slow it down. The content is offered as MIDI as well as stereo audio loops and the drummer's drumkit is sampled/recorded for use in DrumCore's virtual MIDI instrument. Songwriters can use these GrooveSets for writing, as they offer enough content to work on a song, which usually requires related beats and transitions to support a verse/chorus type of structure.

MIDI drum instrument

The DrumCore MIDI drum instrument contains the drum and percussion sounds used by the drummer. This is for primarily for playing the drummers' MIDI grooves but can also be used for creating new beats using the drummers' sounds and a MIDI program that works with VST3, AAX and AU plug-ins.

Integration with other audio applications

DrumCore easily integrates with popular plug-in hosts on Mac and Windows computers. Audio can be exported as WAV, AIFF or REX2, and MIDI grooves can be exported as standard MIDI files, simply by dragging and dropping them to a track.

DrummerPack expansion packs

Numerous expansion packs, known as DrummerPacks, are available on DrumCore.com. Third-party expansion packs are also available from companies like pureMix, Drums-On-Demand, and Sonic Reality.
