= Dave Kushner =

American guitarist (born 1966)

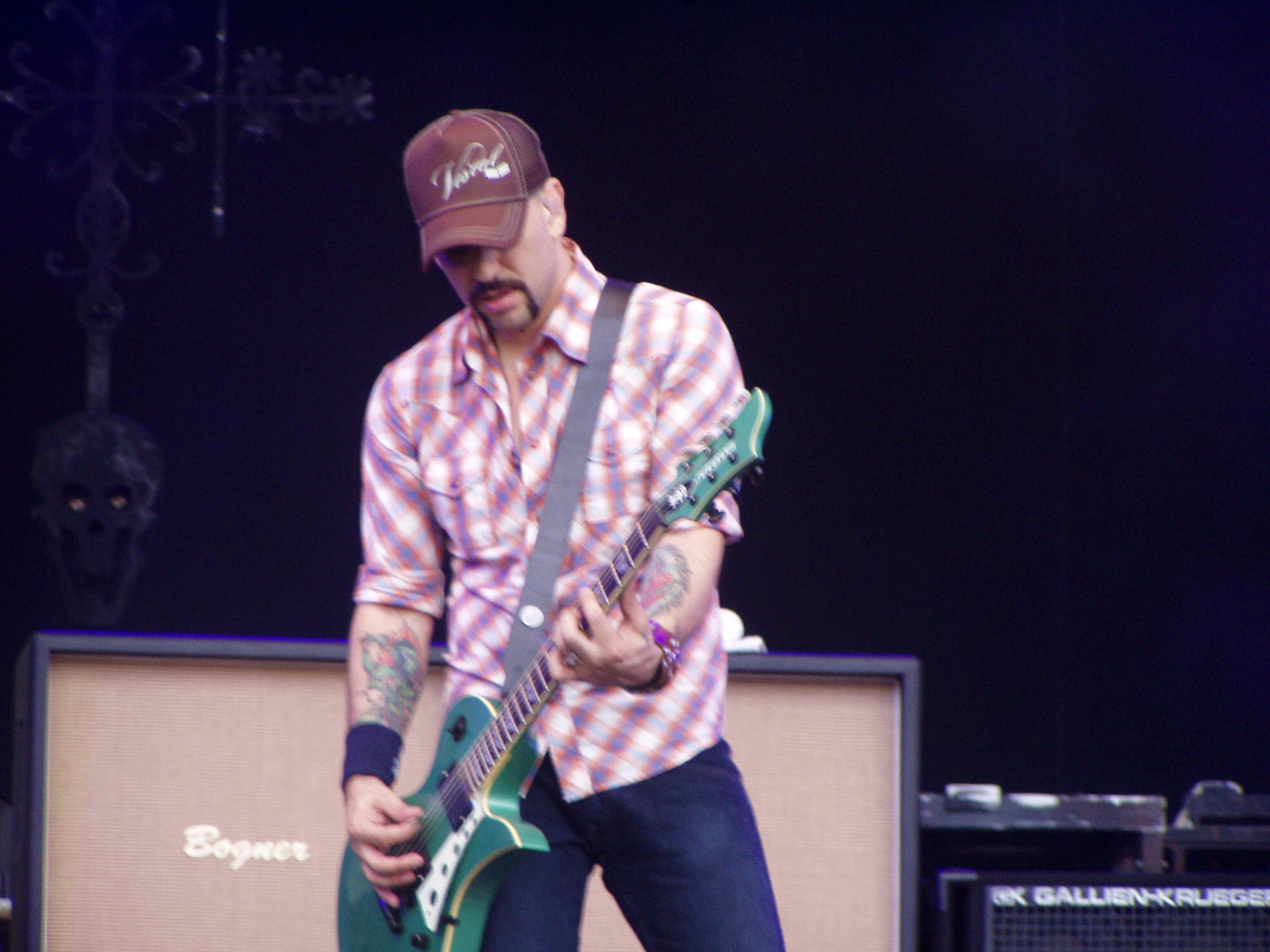
- Kushner with Velvet Revolver at Gods of Metal 2007

Background information
- Born: David Kushner; November 16, 1966 (age 59); Los Angeles, California, U.S.
- Genres: Hard rock, heavy metal, hardcore punk, funk metal
- Occupation: Guitarist
- Years active: 1988–present
- Member of: DKFXP; The Forest Rangers; Infectious Grooves
- Formerly of: Wasted Youth; Electric Love Hogs; Lit; Sugartooth; Danzig; Loaded; Velvet Revolver
- Website: davekushner.com

Dave Kushner (born November 16, 1966) is an American musician best known as the rhythm guitarist for the hard rock supergroup Velvet Revolver. Kushner has also been a member of Wasted Youth, Electric Love Hogs, Loaded, Danzig, Jane's Addiction guitarist Dave Navarro's solo band, Sugartooth, Zilch while he has also recorded with Infectious Grooves, Cyco Miko and more recently collaborated with Scars on Broadway guitarist Franky Perez releasing songs under the pseudonym of DKFXP, a combination of the initials of Perez and Kushner, as well as working with Indian singer and actress Shruti Haasan.

Kushner has also been writing and composing music for films and television, most notable the theme for FX series Sons of Anarchy, titled "This Life", where he received an Emmy Award nomination for Outstanding Main Title Theme Music in 2009 while in 2010 he received an ASCAP Award for the theme. He collaborated with composer John O'Brien on the music for the movies Four Christmases, Couples Retreat and the ABC police drama series Detroit 1-8-7.

In 2009, Kushner was named "One of The 50 Greatest Unsung Guitar Heroes Ever" by Total Guitar magazine.

== Early life ==
Kushner was born November 16, 1966, in Los Angeles. He attended junior high and high school with Slash, frequently attending the shows of Slash's then band Tidus Sloan, and began playing in bands at the age of 16. He attended Musicians Institute in Hollywood at the age of 18 before signing his first record deal when he was 20. Prior to joining Wasted Youth, Kushner worked at Tower Video.

== Career ==
=== Wasted Youth (1988–1989) ===
Kushner joined Wasted Youth as a guitarist but played bass on the group's second album Black Daze, released in 1988, with the exception of the Van Halen cover of "On Fire" where he performed rhythm and lead guitar duties. Kushner left the group over a year later.

=== Electric Love Hogs and Infectious Grooves (1991–1993) ===
The group was initially formed as a cover band in San Diego by friends John Feldmann, Kelly LeMieux and Bobby Hewitt playing their first shows locally before moving to Los Angeles adding Kushner to the group along with guitarist Donni Campion. They named the band Electric Love Hogs in a satirical swipe at the L.A. glam rock scene of the late '80s. They signed a deal with London Records and released their only album Electric Love Hogs in 1992. The album was produced by Mark Dodson whose production credits include Anthrax and Suicidal Tendencies, while Mötley Crüe drummer Tommy Lee also co-produced two album tracks. Percussion for the album was handled by Jane's Addiction drummer Stephen Perkins.

Robert Trujillo, then of Suicidal Tendencies and Infectious Grooves, contributed to the record while Kushner was asked to make a guest appearance on the song "Punk It Up" from the Infectious Grooves debut album The Plague That Makes Your Booty Move...It's the Infectious Grooves, also produced by Dodson, released in 1991 before touring with Infectious Grooves for a few months.

Electric Love Hogs went on to tour with Stone Temple Pilots, when they were known as Mighty Joe Young, and L.A. Guns in the US and Ugly Kid Joe in the United Kingdom. The group disbanded in 1993.

=== Other bands and contributions (1993–2001) ===
After the breakup of Electric Love Hogs in 1993, Kushner, Kelly LeMieux, also of Electric Love Hogs, and Kushner's former Wasted Youth bandmate Joey Castillo formed a new group called Lit. The group went through several lineup changes, with the final lineup consisting of Kushner, former Electric Love Hogs drummer Bobby Hewitt, Jar Gordon on bass, Amir Derakh on guitar and a singer known only as Eric. After a year and a half, Kushner was invited to join Geffen group Sugartooth with Lit being disbanded and selling their name rights to the well known band of the same name.

In 1995, he teamed up with Suicidal Tendencies and Infectious Grooves singer Cyco Miko on his solo album Lost My Brain! before joining Danzig. Kushner's tenure in Danzig lasted 9 months and he performed only one show at the Whisky a Go Go in Hollywood.

In 1997, Kushner appeared on the compilation album Friends & Family, Vol. 1 which featured music by Suicidal Tendencies, Infectious Grooves and Cyco Miko among others.

In 1998, Kushner joined the hard rock group Zilch, formed by former X Japan guitarist hide. Unfortunately, hide died before the release of their debut album. The group continued and eventually recorded and released Skyjin in 2001 and it was during this time that Kushner met Duff McKagan who, at the time, was touring with Loaded.

In 2001, Kushner became musical director for Jane's Addiction guitarist Dave Navarro's touring band following the released of his solo album Trust No One.

=== Loaded and Velvet Revolver (2002–2008) ===
During a tour of Japan, former Guns N' Roses bassist Duff McKagan, touring with his group Loaded, met Kushner who was at the time playing with Japanese hard rock group Zilch. After the tour, bassist Jeff Rouse left the band to rejoin Alien Crime Syndicate to release their new album XL from Coast to Coast with Mike Squires also leaving to join ACS becoming the group's second guitarist. Kushner and bassist George Stuart Dahlquist, of Asva and Burning Witch, replaced the departed duo. Loaded announced a tour of Europe with stops in the Netherlands, Germany, France, Italy and Spain as well as shows in the UK however this tour was soon canceled after McKagan began collaborating with his former Guns N' Roses bandmates on a new project.

After performing at a benefit gig for Randy Castillo in 2002, former Guns N' Roses members Slash, Duff McKagan and Matt Sorum decided to form a new band after recognizing that their musical relationship was still very much intact. Initially they began rehearsing with Buckcherry duo Josh Todd and Keith Nelson, who performed with the trio at the benefit, but eventually decided against forming a group with them. During a Loaded show at Hollywood's Viper Room, McKagan introduced Kushner to Slash, after Kushner said they had known each other previously, who confirmed they were friends at Junior High and High School. After Kushner jammed with the group he was invited to join with Slash stating that "Dave brought a cool vibe to what we were doing. There was no deliberation; that was it, it was a perfect fit." Former Guns N' Roses rhythm guitarist Izzy Stradlin also joined them for 2 weeks eventually suggesting that "Duff and I will sing and we will just do a club tour in a van." Slash states in his autobiography that it was hard to tell if Stradlin was serious or kidding. After auditioning Kelly Shaefer (of Atheist/Neurotica), Stradlin left the group.

While Shaefer's audition was unsuccessful, the quartet continued auditioning for a lead singer, with VH1 filming the recruitment process. The quartet were referred to under the temporary name "The Project" during this time. The resulting documentary was aired as VH1 Inside Out: The Rise of Velvet Revolver. A number of lead singers auditioned, including Canadian Todd Kerns (formerly of Age of Electric), Miljenko Matijevic (of Steelheart), Sebastian Bach (formerly of Skid Row), Shawn Albro (of U.P.O.), and Travis Meeks (of Days of the New). Myles Kennedy (of Alter Bridge and formerly of The Mayfield Four) declined an invitation, from Sorum, to audition, because he wanted to focus more on other projects. Scott Weiland had become friends with McKagan (via their respective wives) and had once played on the same bill as Kushner, when Electric Love Hogs supported Mighty Joe Young. Originally Weiland was wanted by the band but due to STP still touring he declined. After the band heard about STP's split in 2003, they were quick to get Weiland involved. Once he heard the material and offered his services as the lead singer, the band was formed.

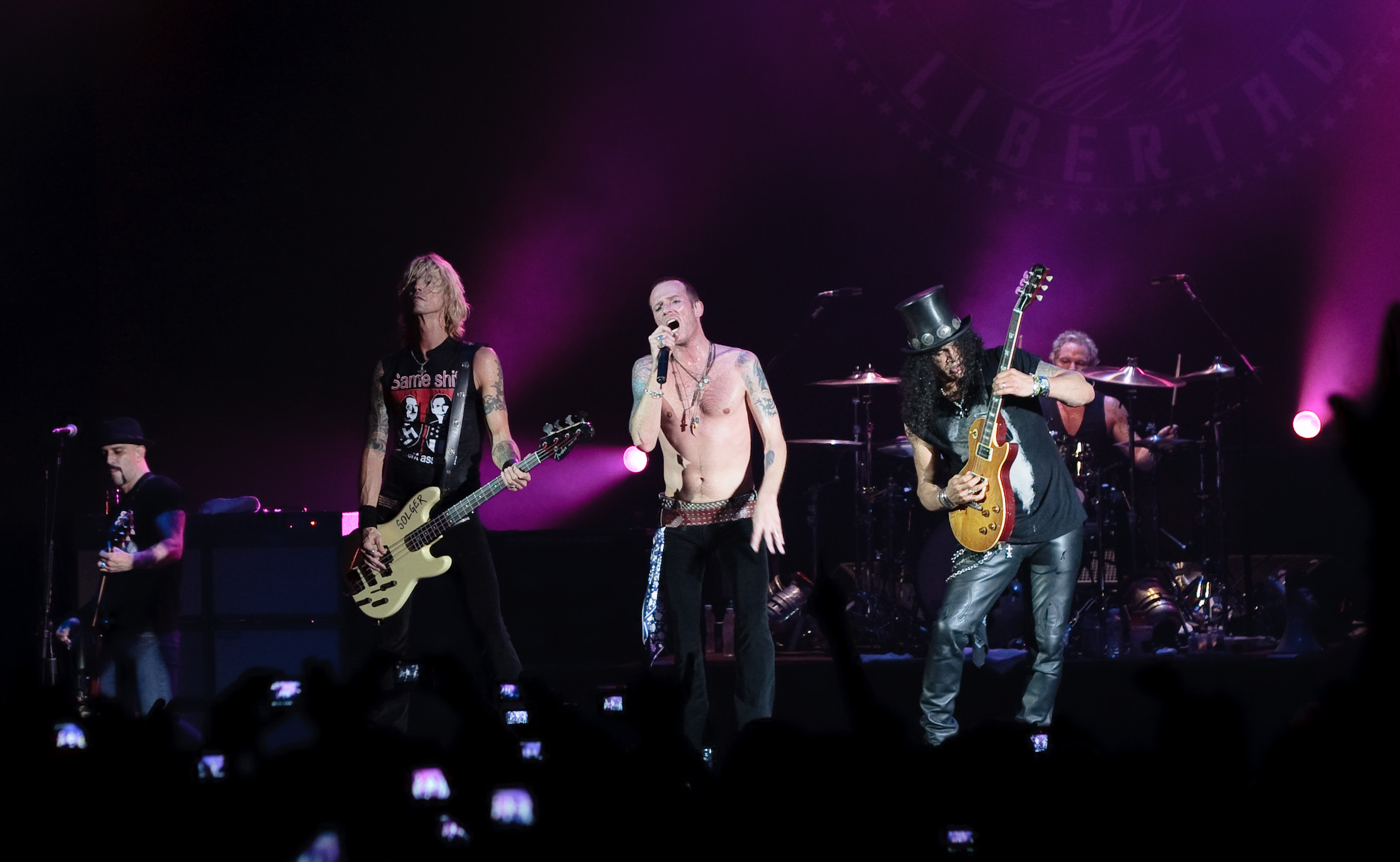
Kushner (far left) with Velvet Revolver at the Hammersmith Apollo, London, 2007

The group released their debut album Contraband in 2004, debuting at number one on the Billboard 200, and the follow-up, Libertad, in 2007. The albums were produced by Josh Abraham and Brendan O'Brien respectively. Contraband album tracks "Set Me Free" and "Dirty Little Thing" appeared on the soundtracks to the movies Hulk and xXx: State of the Union while they recorded a cover of Pink Floyd's "Money" and a new song entitled "Come On, Come In" for The Italian Job remake and Fantastic Four respectively. With their single "Slither", they won the 2005 Grammy Award for Best Hard Rock Performance and nominated for Rock Album of the Year and Rock Song "Fall to Pieces".

Weiland stated on March 20, 2008, at Velvet Revolver's show in Glasgow that this would be the band's final tour. At the time Slash hinted in an interview with Classic Rock magazine that, contrary to Weiland's assertions, Velvet Revolver will continue beyond its current tour. When asked "Will Scott be singing?", Slash replied "I have no comment on that", and laughed.

It was announced on April 1 that Weiland had officially parted ways with Velvet Revolver. Later that month, Weiland performed with Stone Temple Pilots for the first time since 2002, kicking off their reunion tour.

The release of Slash's solo album, Slash, and Duff McKagan's addition to the Jane's Addiction lineup, both in 2010, seemed to put future of the band in doubt. However they remained optimistic about the future, with new songs written and planned to reconvene in 2011 while in September 2010, McKagan departed Jane's Addiction. Ultimately Slash and McKagan officially returned to Guns N' Roses in 2016 for the Not In This Lifetime... Tour.

=== Post-Velvet Revolver (2009–present) ===
On June 20, 2009, Scars on Broadway guitarist and solo artist Franky Perez announced via his official MySpace that he was in the studio collaborating with Kushner. To date they have released three songs for free via the Franky Perez official website under the pseudonym of DKFXP, a combination of the initials of Perez and Kushner.

In October 2009, Franky Perez said on his Twitter account that he and Kushner were jamming with Weezer bassist Scott Shriner and his Scars on Broadway bandmate, drummer John Dolmayan.

In 2009, he played rhythm guitar with rock band Weezer when they performed "The Greatest Man That Ever Lived" on Spike TV's Video Game Awards.

On September 8, 2010, it was announced that Kushner was to collaborate with Indian singer and actress Shruti Haasan on a new musical project. Haasan will be writing the lyrics with Kushner composing the music. On working with Kushner, Haasan stated: " When the opportunity to work with US supergroup guru David Kushner came to me, I was really excited. I really loved Dave's song and felt a connect between it and my music, thereby making it a meaningful collaboration for me. As a singer, songwriter and musician and a rock-n-roll loyalist, this is a dream come true [...] Dave is an icon and it's an unbelievable opportunity for any musician. I'm also so thrilled to be able to express myself as an artist on a global platform of this caliber. To be the first Indian to get an opportunity like this to not just sing but also write the English lyrics for this track, is truly an honour". It was later announced, on September 21, that Kushner and Dave Navarro collaborated on a cover of The Kinks' "You Really Got Me" to be used in a Hyundai commercial.

=== Soundtracking career (2008–present) ===
Alongside Bob Thiele Jr., Curtis Stigers and Kurt Sutter, Kushner co-wrote the theme song for the 2008 FX television series Sons of Anarchy titled "This Life". In 2009, the song was nominated for a Primetime Emmy Award for Outstanding Main Title Theme Music but lost out to the theme for PBS television series Great Performances. In 2010, the quartet received an ASCAP Award for the theme.

Kushner was also asked to develop a spin-off of How I Met Your Mother entitled "The Bro Code" by Fox creative director Dave Warren and The Simpsons segment director Ralph Sosa. Kushner also wrote a song with composer John O'Brien, Franky Perez and Dave Navarro for a new merchandise line called "Bartrock" after Dave Warren wanted "a song to tie in with the merch line".

In 2010, Kushner announced that he removed the vocals and "messed around" with the song "Beyond the Wire", which he released with Perez as DKFXP, giving it the new title of "Beyond the Snake". The song appears at the end credits of the film Hisss featuring vocals and lyrics by Shruti Haasan. Four tracks by both Perez and Kushner were to appear in the film Hamill.

Kushner has also collaborated with friend and composer John O'Brien on numerous occasions providing music to films such as Four Christmases, Couples Retreat and most recently, the ABC drama series Detroit 1-8-7 which aired in the fall season of 2010.

== Musical equipment ==
Kushner has been a longtime user of Fernandes Guitars and has two signature models based on the Ravelle available in forest green finish with cream binding and metallic blue finish with black binding. Besides his signature guitars he also owns Montereys and Vertigos from Fernandes as well as a Yamaha SAO 503 TVL, which is the signature guitar for Troy Van Leeuwen from Queens of the Stone Age. Lately Kushner's main instruments have been various Gibson models including the ES-335, SG and Les Paul models.

Dave uses a 12-space rack with a switching system that allows him to use whatever effects he would like in any sequence. Some of the effect pedals he uses most often include Line 6 DM-4, Boss Flanger BF-2, Boss Super Phaser PH-2, Boss Chorus Ensemble CE-5, Boss Digital Delay DD-3, Line 6 Filter Pro, Dynacord CLS222, Rocktron Hush II CX Noise Reduction System, Electro-Harmonix Micro synth, Boss Hyperfuzz, Line 6 delay pedal, and a MXR Zakk Wylde overdrive pedal. He also uses Dunlop programmable Wah Wah effects and Rotovibe MIDI controllers which are rackmounted.

Kushner mostly uses Bogner amplifiers during live performances, specifically an Ecstasy 101B amplifier that runs Bogner straight cabs fitted with Vintage Celestion 30 watt and Celestion Greenbacks 25 watt speakers. He has used Mesa Boogie Stilletto Ace and Fender Super Sonic amplifiers.

== Discography ==
Title	Release	Label	Band
Black Daze	1988	Medusa	Wasted Youth
The Plague That Makes Your Booty Move...It's the Infectious Grooves	1991	Epic	Infectious Grooves
Electric Love Hogs	1992	London	Electric Love Hogs
Lost My Brain!	1996	Epic	Cyco Miko
Friends & Family, Vol. 1	1997	Suicidal	Various Artists (Cyco Miko)
Skyjin	2001	Avex Trax	Zilch
Sons of Anarchy: North Country – EP	2009	20th Century Fox TV Records	Various Artists (The Forest Rangers)
Sons of Anarchy: Shelter – EP	2009	20th Century Fox TV Records	Various Artists (The Forest Rangers)
Sons of Anarchy: The King is Gone	2010	20th Century Fox TV Records	Various Artists (The Forest Rangers)
Hisss Soundtrack	2010	Venus	Shruti Haasan (featuring DKFXP)
Songs of Anarchy: Music from Sons of Anarchy Seasons 1–4	2011	Columbia	Various Artists (The Forest Rangers)
Sons of Anarchy: Songs of Anarchy Vol. 2	2012	Columbia	Various Artists (The Forest Rangers)
Avengers Assemble: Music from and Inspired by the Motion Picture	2012	Hollywood / Marvel Music	Various Artists (PusherJones)
PusherJones	2013	Self-released	PusherJones

== Awards and nominations ==
Year	Nominee / work	Award	Result
2004	Velvet Revolver	Kerrang! Award for Best International Newcomer	Won
2005	Velvet Revolver	Billboard Music Award for Rock Artist of the Year	Nominated
2005	"Slither"	Grammy Award for Best Hard Rock Performance	Won
2005	"Fall to Pieces"	Grammy Award for Best Rock Song	Nominated
2005	"Contraband"	Grammy Award for Best Rock Album	Nominated
2005	"Fall to Pieces"	Radio Music Award for Song of the Year/Rock Radio	Nominated
2009	"This Life"	Primetime Emmy Award for Outstanding Main Title Theme Music	Nominated
2010	"This Life"	ASCAP Award	Won
