= Deadland Ritual =

British-American rock band

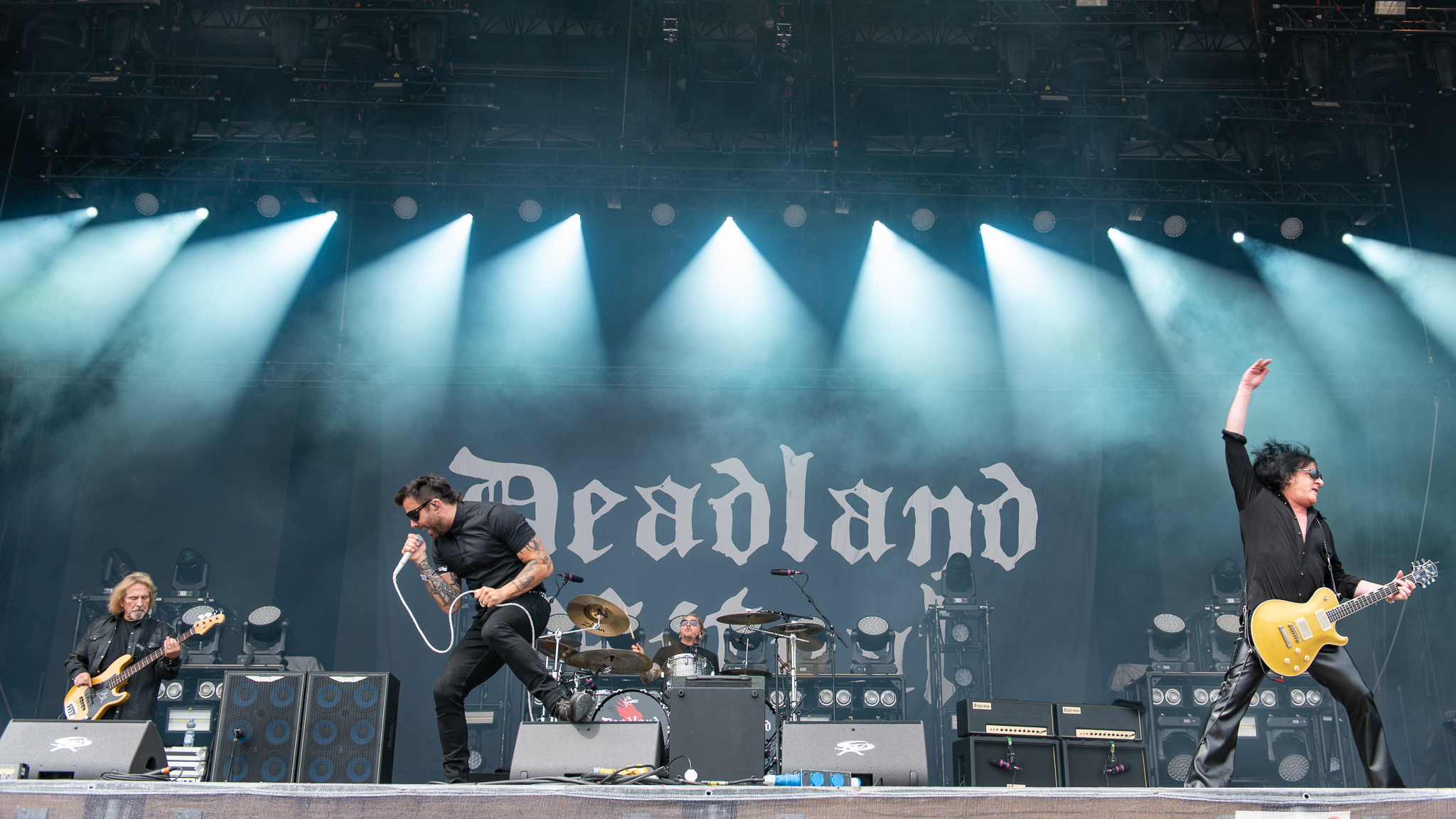
- Deadland Ritual performing at Rock im Park 2019

Background information
- Origin: Los Angeles, California, U.S.
- Genres: Hard rock; blues rock; heavy metal
- Years active: 2018–2019
- Labels: Sonik Riot; AWAL
- Past members: Franky Perez; Steve Stevens; Geezer Butler; Matt Sorum
- Website: deadlandritual.com

Deadland Ritual was a British–American hard rock supergroup band originally formed in Los Angeles in 2018, the band is a supergroup composed of vocalist Franky Perez (Apocalyptica), guitarist Steve Stevens (Billy Idol, Michael Jackson), bassist Geezer Butler (Black Sabbath, Heaven and Hell) and drummer Matt Sorum (the Cult, Guns N' Roses, Velvet Revolver and many others). Originally formed by Sorum, the group took shape with the addition of Perez and Stevens, and was finalised once Butler agreed to complete the lineup. Deadland Ritual released its first single, "Down in Flames", in December 2018.

== History ==
=== 2018–2019: formation, debut recordings and performances ===
The formation of Deadland Ritual was first announced on December 3, 2018, when the band's members began posting teasers of new music on their social media pages. Drummer Matt Sorum (formerly of Guns N' Roses, Velvet Revolver and more) initially conceived the band by enlisting vocalist Franky Perez (of Apocalyptica and formerly Scars on Broadway) and guitarist Steve Stevens (of Billy Idol), with former Black Sabbath bassist Geezer Butler brought in later. The drummer also came up with the name of the band, which is said to "reflect the idea of a ritualistic dead space". The band released its debut single and music video, "Down in Flames", a week later. The track was produced by Greg Fidelman. Revolver magazine's Kelsey Chapstick categorised the song as "heavy, bluesy rock", outlining that it "carries the sinister, devilish tones trademarked by Butler, but the exultant vocal performance by Perez and groove-laden syncopations of Sorum lend a distinctly contemporary hard-rock feel". Ryan Reed for Rolling Stone described the track as "a brooding blues-rock epic". Deadland Ritual played their first live shows in 2019, appearing at Download Festival in the UK and Hellfest in France, both in June. However, the band's debut was performed at The Troubadour in West Hollywood, California on May 28, 2019.

=== Future ===
In a March 2021 interview, Geezer Butler said that Matt Sorum had left the project and that he considers Deadland Ritual dead.

== Members ==
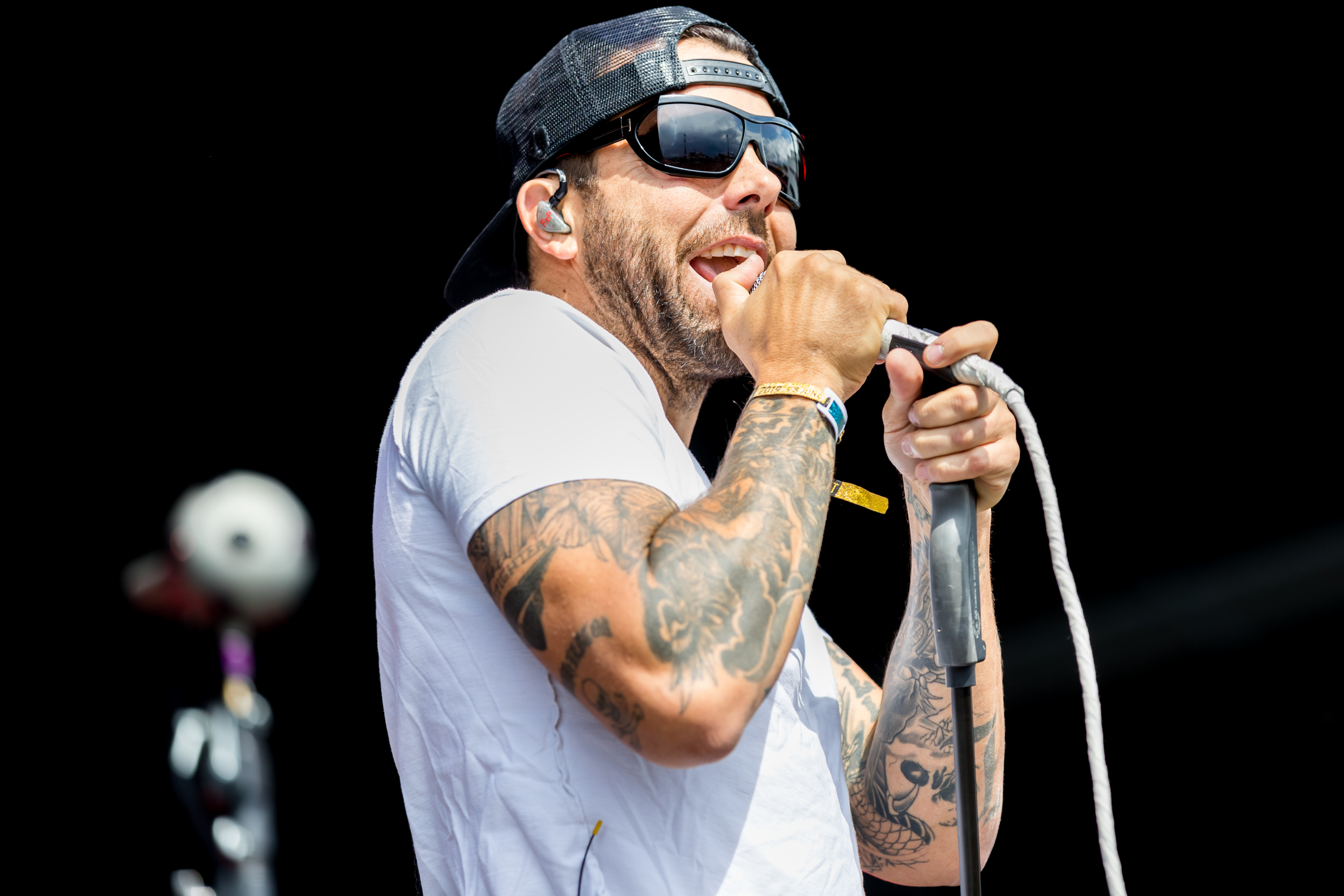
Perez

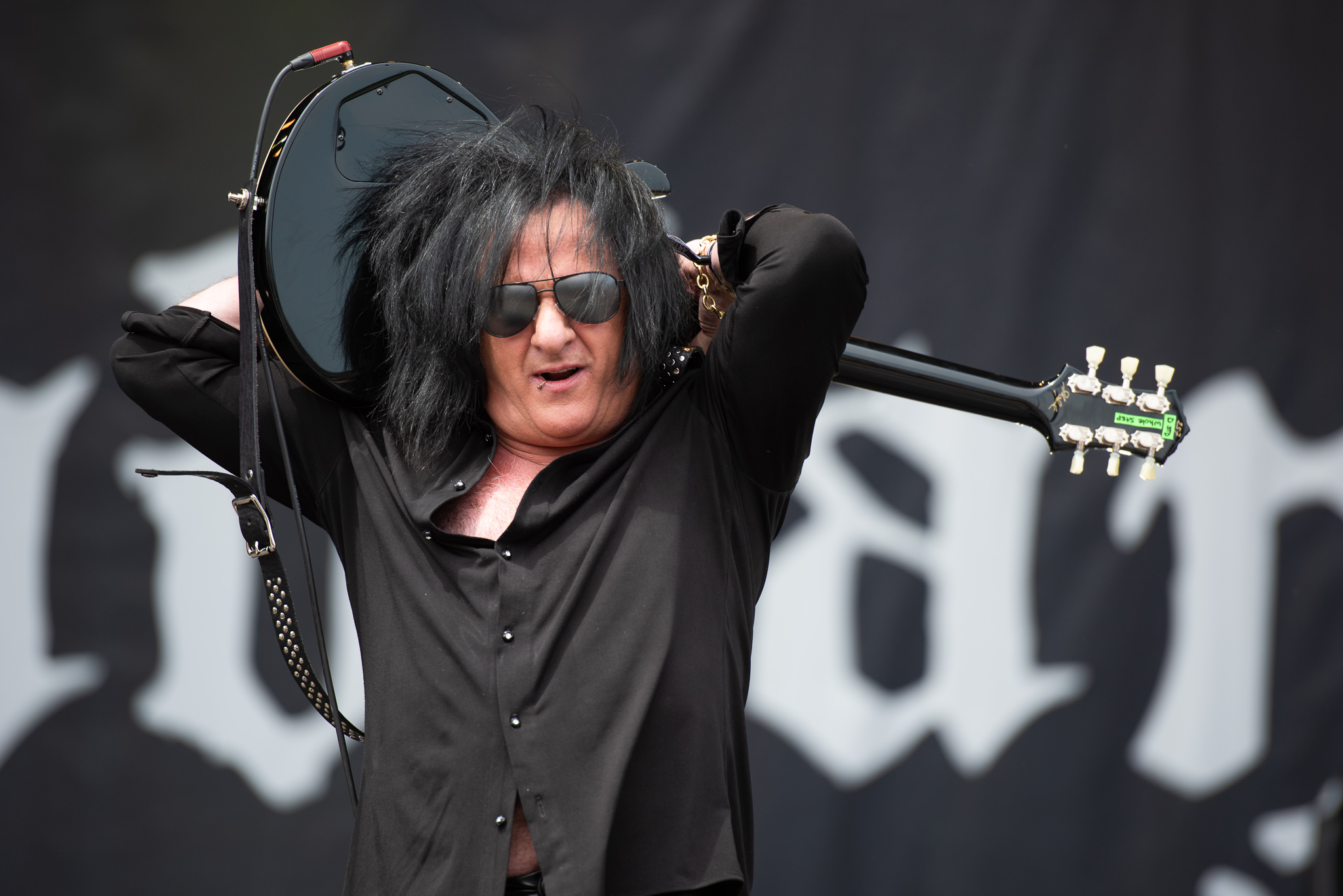
Stevens

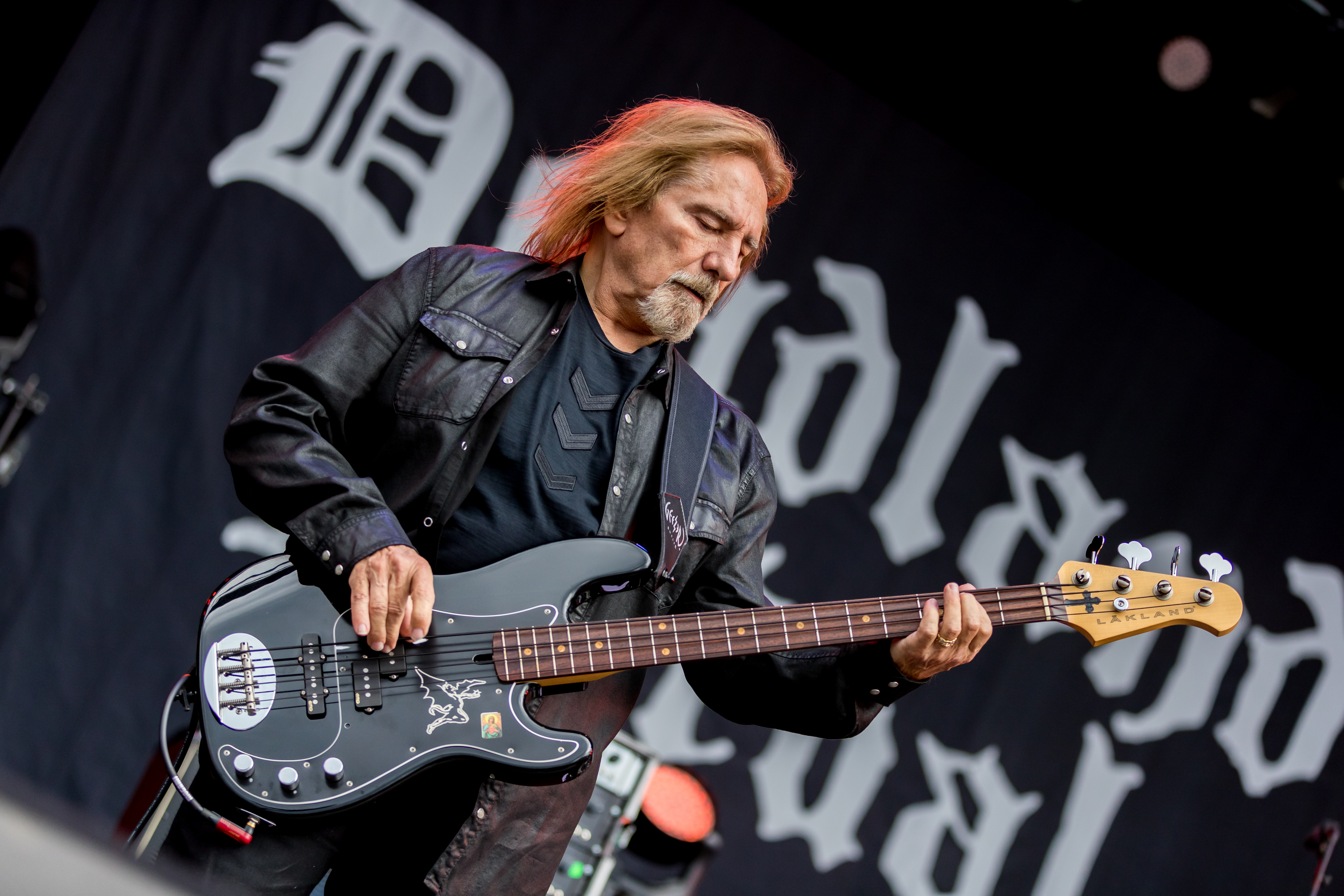
Butler

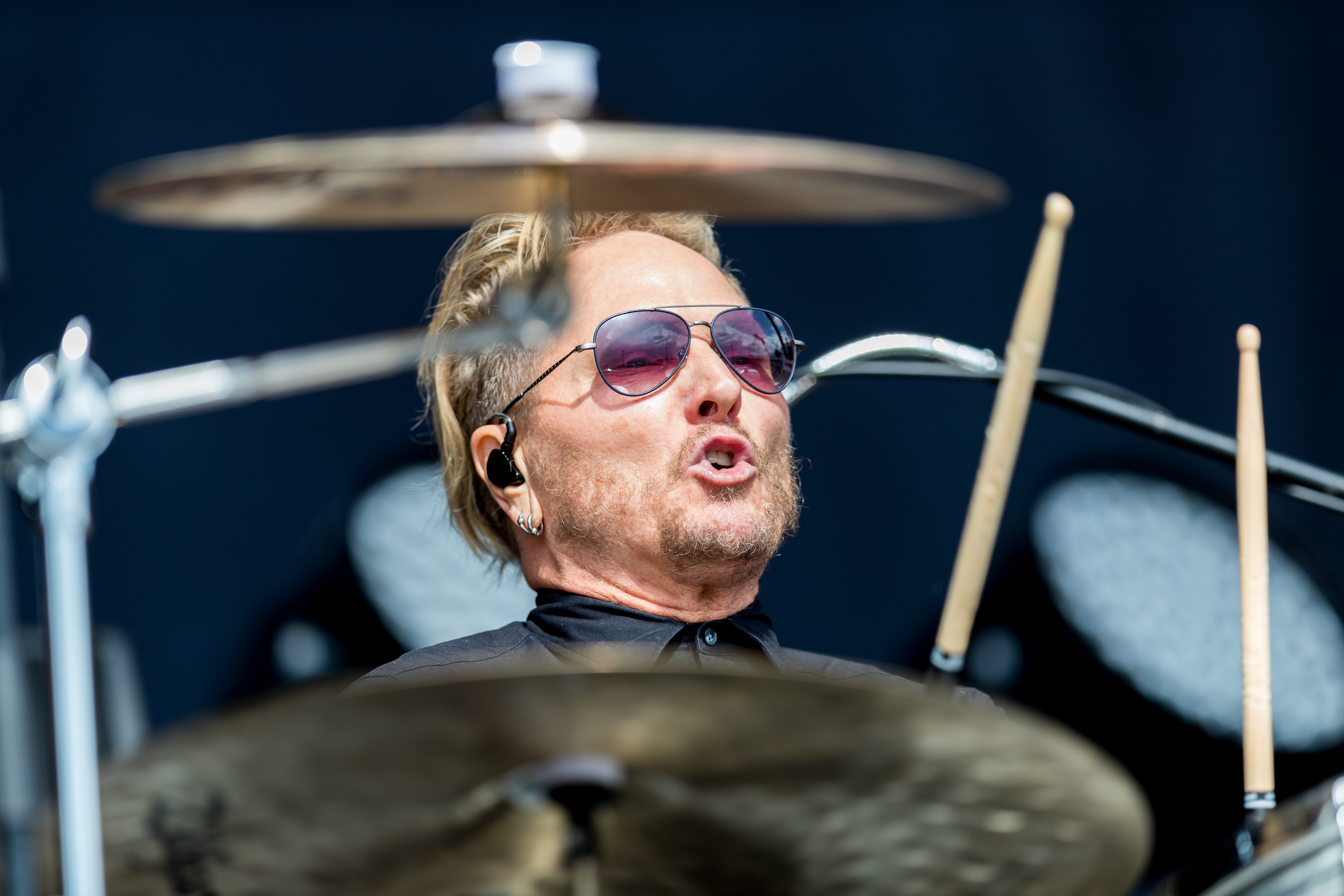
Sorum
- Franky Perez – lead vocals
- Steve Stevens – guitars
- Geezer Butler – bass guitar
- Matt Sorum – drums, backing vocals

== Discography ==
Singles

- "Down in Flames" (2018)
- "Broken and Bruised" (2019)
