= DKFXP =

US musical group

- Origin: Las Vegas, Nevada/Los Angeles, California, USA
- Genres: Rock, hard rock
- Years active: 2009–present
- Members: Franky Perez; Dave Kushner

DKFXP is an American musical collaboration between Franky Perez (FXP), of Scars on Broadway, and Dave Kushner (DK), of Velvet Revolver. To date, three songs by the duo have been released, for free download via the Franky Perez website, while one was reworked by Kushner and used for the film Hisss, featuring vocals and lyrics by Shruti Haasan.

== History ==
=== Formation (2009–present) ===
On June 20, 2009, Scars on Broadway guitarist and solo artist Franky Perez announced, via MySpace, that he was in the studio collaborating with Velvet Revolver guitarist Dave Kushner. On September 19, announced through his blog on Myspace, Franky released the song Party Of One, available to download from his website along with a code to use to download the song. In October, Franky stated on his Twitter account that he and Kushner were jamming with Weezer bassist Scott Shriner and Scars on Broadway bandmate and former System of a Down drummer John Dolmayan. On November 16, another songs, titled The Collapse, was made available to download. On December 1, Franky listed all the songs that had been released for free previously, as well as the codes to download them, including the song Beyond the Wire which was previously only available to US troops serving in the war.

In 2010, Kushner announced that he removed the vocals and "messed around" with the song "Beyond the Wire", giving it the new title of "Beyond the Snake". The song appears at the end credits of the film Hisss, as well as the film soundtrack, featuring vocals and lyrics by Shruti Haasan. Four tracks by both Perez and Kushner will also appear in the film Hamill.

== Songs ==
All tracks are written by Dave Kushner and Franky Perez.

No.	Title	Length
1.	"The Collapse"	3:22
2.	"Beyond the Wire"	3:25
3.	"Party of One"	3:47

Other appearances

Song	Album	Release
"Beyond the Snake" (featuring Shruti Haasan)	Hisss Soundtrack	2010

== Members ==
- Franky Perez
- Dave Kushner
