= Franky Perez =

American musician (born 1976)

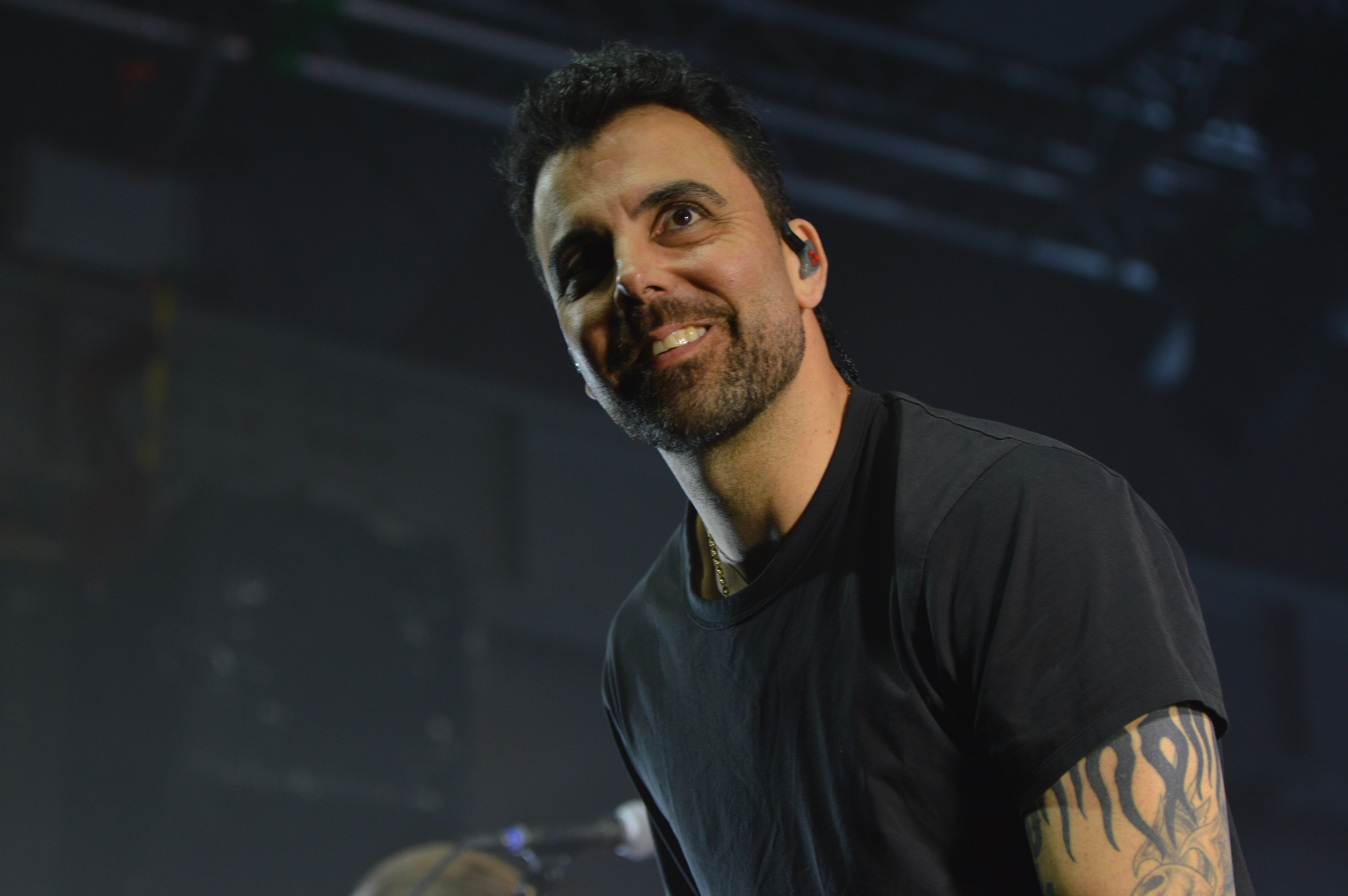
- Perez in 2023

Background information
- Born: February 24, 1976 (age 50); Las Vegas, Nevada, U.S.
- Genres: Alternative metal; hard rock; rock and roll; blues
- Occupations: Musician; entertainer; singer-songwriter
- Instruments: Vocals; guitar; drums; bass; percussion
- Years active: 1995–present
- Label: Lava
- Website: fxptheartist.com

Franky Perez is an American musician best known as a solo artist, touring vocalist of the Finnish metal band Apocalyptica, and as former guitarist for Scars on Broadway. He has also released three solo albums, Poor Man's Son, My 4th of July, and Addict, and performed with guitarist Slash in his live band before Slash assembled the touring band that backed him during his first full solo tour with Myles Kennedy. Perez has also collaborated with Slash's Velvet Revolver bandmate Dave Kushner, releasing songs under the pseudonym of DKFXP, as well as the virtual band Pusher Jones, contributing the song "Count Me Out" to The Avengers soundtrack.

Perez has performed with a number of all-star cover bands over the years including Camp Freddy, Ducati All-Stars, Royal Machines, and Kings of Chaos.

He sang for the supergroup Deadland Ritual, alongside guitarist Steve Stevens (Billy Idol), bassist Geezer Butler (Black Sabbath) and drummer Matt Sorum (the Cult, Guns N' Roses, Velvet Revolver and many others).

== Biography ==
=== Solo career (2002–present) ===
At the beginning of his career, Perez befriended conga player and Cuban exile Lazaro Valdez before moving to Miami, Florida although he initially planned on moving to New York City. After waiting tables in Miami, Perez was contacted by former Van Halen and The Black Crowes manager Pete Angelus who suggested that Perez move from Miami to Los Angeles. Perez also brought his band to L.A., named The Highway Saints, and signed a deal with Atlantic Records in 2002. He released his debut solo album, titled Poor Man's Son, on May 13, 2003 to some positive reviews, with Christina Fuoco of AllMusic stating that "with Cuban music as a base, he successfully experiments with a buffet of tastes including sultry blues, roots rock, inoffensive '80s rock, and anthemic pop." The album's single, "Something Crazy", peaked at number 22 on the Billboard Adult Top 40.

In 2005, Perez released My 4th of July and toured in support which included an appearance at the Rock Fest in Cadott, Wisconsin.

On March 14, 2010, Perez announced that he had signed with Sanctuary Artist Management intending to release a new solo album.

=== Scars on Broadway (2008–2012) ===
After recording an album and posting their first track online, titled "They Say", Scars on Broadway collaborators Daron Malakian and John Dolmayan (both of System of a Down) recruited new members to perform for upcoming live shows. Added to the lineup were Perez, on guitar, Dominic Cifarelli, on bass, and Danny Shamoun on keyboards and percussion. They played their first live show in April 2008, at the Whisky a Go Go, and played at the Coachella Festival in the same month. The group's debut album, Scars on Broadway, was released in July of the same year. In August they announced their first North American tour in support of their debut release, while also releasing a music video for the track "World Long Gone", however the tour was canceled by Malakian for "compelling reasons". Perez addressed the fans about the tour cancellation saying:

I know the news has been extremely shocking to all of you. However, I know that Daron has compelling reasons to not continue with the tour at this time. I wanted to take the time to thank him and John for giving me such an incredible opportunity to do what I love and to be a part of an amazing band with undeniable talent. They are like brothers to me and with time our band became like family which made the news even harder to swallow. I also want to thank the fans from all over the world for all of your support and for welcoming us with open arms. I hope you will continue supporting us no matter where this journey leads us. Each member of Scars has a deep love and passion for music that will never die. With that said, this is not a goodbye, but a see you later.

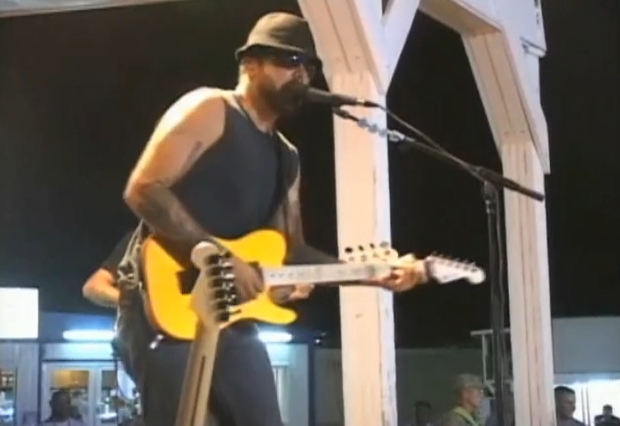
Perez performing with Scars on Broadway in 2008.

Almost a year after the tour cancellation, Scars on Broadway announced they were to tour U.S. Army bases in Iraq without Malakian. Perez stated that "We all wish that our brother D [Malakian] would come as well, but he has other commitments in the States. He has given us his blessing to go perform and supports the cause completely." In the same year, Malakian, Dolmayan, former System of a Down bassist Shavo Odadjian and Perez performed together at Odadjian's Halloween party at the Roxy Theatre in West Hollywood on October 31, 2009.

On April 13, 2010, Scars on Broadway announced that they were performing a comeback show at The Troubadour in West Hollywood on Sunday, May 2, 2010. During the show, they debuted a new song, reportedly titled "Talkin' Shit", and were joined on stage by Shavo Odadjian, on third guitar, for two songs.

On September 22, 2012, Scars on Broadway performed their first concert in over 2 years at the Epicenter Festival in Irvine, Ca. Franky Perez did not appear, and he confirmed on Facebook that he was no longer in the band.

=== Other work ===
In 2009, Slash announced that Perez was part of his live band, along with John 5, Chris Chaney, Jason Bonham and Teddy Andreadis, to perform at his headlining appearance at the Quart Festival on June 30 in Kristiansand, Norway. He was once again part of Slash's live band, this time on lead vocals, at his show in Las Vegas on October 2 the same year. On September 10, Perez performed at the Ozzy Osbourne tribute at the House of Blues in West Hollywood. Guests at the tribute included Henry Rollins, Tommy Lee, Slash, Billy Bob Thornton, Lemmy and Corey Taylor among others.

On June 20, 2009, Perez announced via his official Myspace that he was in the studio collaborating with Velvet Revolver guitarist Dave Kushner. Perez had briefly been hired as vocalist of Velvet Revolver in 2008 before the band changed their mind. The songs recorded were released under the pseudonym of DKFXP (a combination of both Perez and Kushner's initials), the first released on September 19 titled Party of One. On November 16, another song, titled The Collapse, was made available to download. On December 1, Perez listed all the songs that had been released for free previously, as well as the codes to download them, including the song Beyond the Wire which was previously only available to US troops serving in the war.

In October, Perez stated on his Twitter account that he and Kushner were jamming with Weezer bassist Scott Shriner and his Scars on Broadway bandmate, drummer John Dolmayan.

Also in 2009, Perez recorded a cover of The Who's Slip Kid with heavy metal group Anvil, released on Songs of Anarchy a 2011 album featuring music from the FX television series "Sons of Anarchy". In 2012, Perez performed a cover of Stevie Wonder's, "Higher Ground" for the fifth-season soundtrack of 'Sons of Anarchy', along with Sons of Anarchy house band, The Forest Rangers.

In 2010, a cover band of musicians and Ducati enthusiasts, called Ducati All-Stars, was announced featuring guitarists Billy Morrison (Camp Freddy, The Cult, Circus Diablo), Steve Jones (Sex Pistols), Steve Stevens (Billy Idol), Chris Wyse (The Cult) on bass, Jason Bonham (Led Zeppelin) on drums, and Donovan Leitch (Camp Freddy), Mark McGrath (Sugar Ray) and Perez on vocals. They played their first show at the Roxy Theatre, Saturday, January 2. The group plan on performing more shows, including a possible tour of the West Coast and overseas.

After performing together at the "Giving 2010" benefit event on May 3, 2010, Perez formed the cover band "Carnival of Dogs" with Matt Sorum (Velvet Revolver, Camp Freddy, formerly of Guns N' Roses and The Cult), Tracii Guns (L.A. Guns, Brides of Destruction) and Phil Soussan (formerly of Ozzy Osbourne, Billy Idol and Vince Neil).

Perez has performed with the cover band Camp Freddy on numerous occasions over the years.

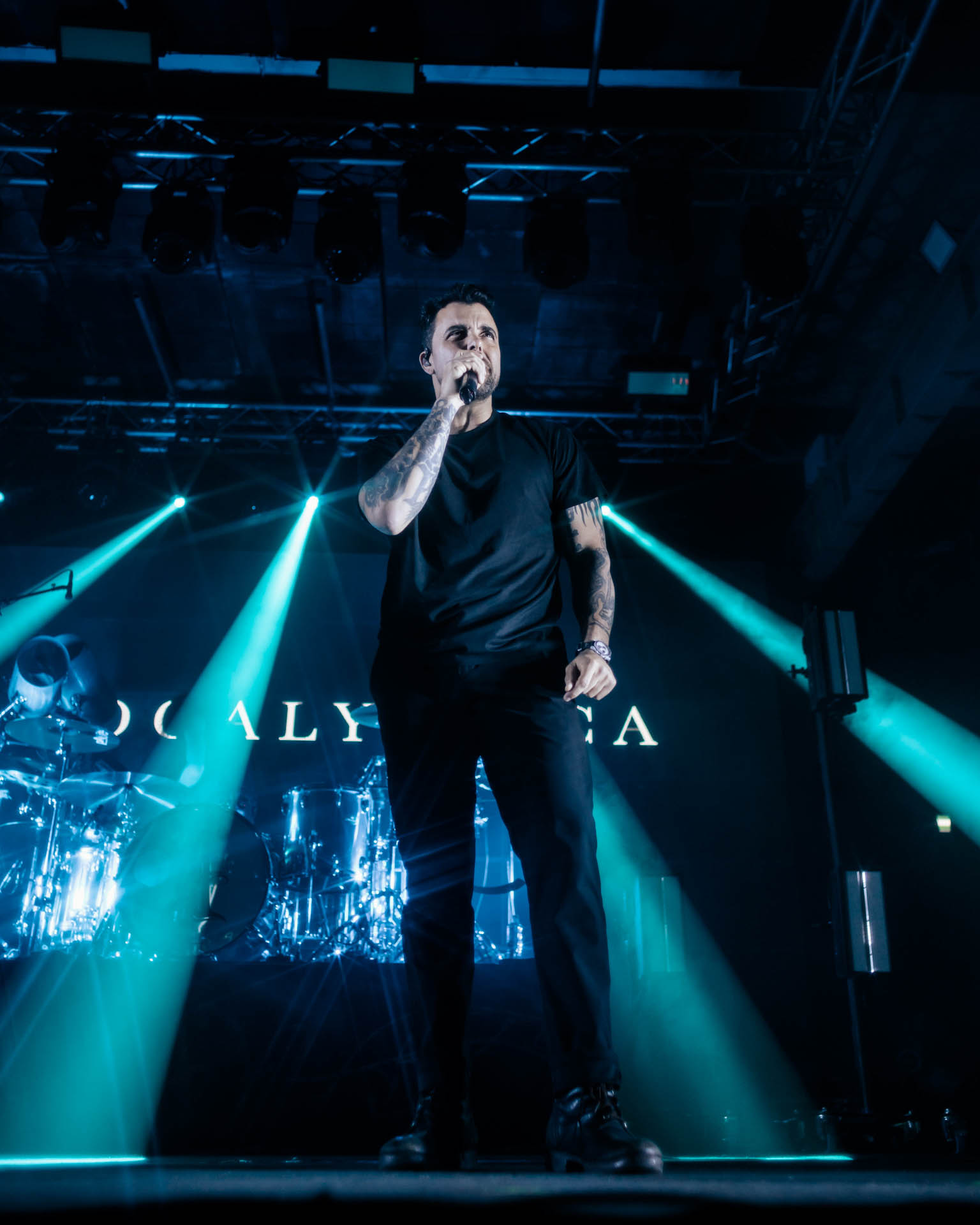
Franky Perez sings with Apocalyptica band in Poland, 2023

As of 2015, he is the exclusive singer on the vocal tracks for the new Apocalyptica album, Shadowmaker. He will also sing on the subsequent live shows. Regarding the possibility of having him as an official member, Apocalyptica co-founder Eicca Toppinen said "it's too early to think about it but nothing is decided! Now we got the record done and then we will have touring more or less for 2 years and at the end of that time or sometime during those 2 years we will know. But it wouldn't be an impossible option to have Franky [...]".

== Discography ==
Studio albums

- Poor Man's Son (2003)
- My 4th of July (2005)
- ADDICT (2014)
- Suddenly 44 (2020)
- Crossing The Great Divide (2022)

with Apocalyptica

- Shadowmaker (2015, album)
- I'll Get Through It (2022, single)
