= Stratosphere (Matt Sorum album) =

Statosphere

Studio album by Matt Sorum
- Released: 2014

Stratosphere is the second studio album by American singer-songwriter and drummer Matt Sorum. Credited to "Matt Sorum's Fierce Joy", it was released in 2014 and contains tracks in a variety of styles. AllMusic reviewer John Christopher Monger rated the album 4 stars out of 5 and described it as "a big, dusty, vintage blast of open-road classic rock, breezy singer/songwriter folk-pop, and occasionally lavish chamber/psych rock".

== Track listing ==
All lyrics written by Matt Sorum

No.	Title	Length
1.	"Intro (Stratosphere Part 1)"	0:22
2.	"The Sea"	3:07
3.	"What Ziggy Says"	3:23
4.	"For The Wild Ones"	3:35
5.	"Goodbye to You"	4:35
6.	"Gone"	4:17
7.	"Lady of the Stone"	4:12
8.	"Ode to Nick Drake"	3:21
9.	"Blue"	4:01
10.	"Josephine"	4:07
11.	"Land of the Pure"	5:37
12.	"Killers N Lovers"	5:49
13.	"The Lonely Teardrop"	3:22
14.	"Outro (Stratosphere Part 2)"	1:32
