= 2024 UCI Mountain Bike season =

Mountain Bike season

Details
- Dates: 13 January – 22 December
- Location: World

The 2024 UCI Mountain Bike season was the 19th season of the UCI Mountain Bike season. The 2024 season began on 13 January with the Israel Cup 1 Mishmar Haemek in Israel and ends on 22 December 2024 with the Helaz XCO Series 3 in Malaysia.

== Events ==
=== January ===
| Date | Race Name | Location | Class | Winner | Second | Third | Ref |
|---|---|---|---|---|---|---|---|
| 13 January | Israel Cup 1 Mishmar Haemek | (Israel) Mishmar HaEmek | 2 | Tomer Zaltsman (ISR); Na'ama Noyman (ISR) | Gil Ly Gonen (ISR); Naomi Luria (ISR) | Eitan Levi (ISR); Romi Veldnizki (ISR) | |
| 16–17 January | 2024 Thailand Mountain Bike Cup | (Thailand) Kanchanaburi | 1 | Gil Ly Gonen (ISR); Na'ama Noyman (ISR) | Feri Yudoyono (INA); Sayu Bella (INA) | Riyadh Hakim (SIN); Alina Sarkulova (KAZ) | |
| 20 January | Momentum Medical Scheme Attakwas Extreme | (South Africa) Oudtshoorn | 1 | Alex Miller (NAM); Samantha Sanders (RSA) | Matthew Beers (RSA); Greta Seiwald (ITA) | Marco Joubert (RSA); Sarah Hill (RSA) | |
| 25–28 January | Costa Blanca Bike Race - CBBR - XCMS | (Spain) Calpe | S1 | Krzysztof Łukasik (POL); Janika Lõiv (EST) | Mats Tubaas Glende (NOR); Terese Andersson (SWE) | Emil Hasund Eid (NOR); Cristina Morán Roza (ESP) | |
| 26–28 January | Copa Internacional UCI Specialized-Rio Cruces Valdivia 2024 | (Chile) Valdivia | 1 | Martín Vidaurre (CHI) (XCO); Catalina Vidaurre (CHI) (XCO); Martín Vidaurre (CHI) (XCC); Catalina Vidaurre (CHI) (XCC) | José Gabriel Marques (BRA) (XCO); Hercília Najara (BRA) (XCO); Gustavo Xavier de Oliveira (BRA) (XCC); Hercília Najara (BRA) (XCC) | Alex Malacarne (BRA) (XCO); Yarela Gonzalez (CHI) (XCO); Alex Malacarne (BRA) (XCC); Carolina Flores (MEX) (XCC) | |
| 27 January | Hellenic XCC Series #1 | (Greece) Larissa | 3 | Alexandros Athanasiadis (GRE); Eleftheria Giachou (GRE) | Dimitrios Antoniadis (GRE); Varvara Fasoi (GRE) | Charoun Molla (GRE); Alexandra Adam (GRE) | |
| 27–30 January | Club La Santa 4 Stage MTB Lanzarote - XCMS | (Spain) Lanzarote | S1 | Ismael Ventura (ESP); Tessa Kortekaas (NED) | Jorge Lamiel (ESP); Manuela Mureșan (ROU) | Periklis Ilias (GRE); Janka Keseg Števková (SVK) | |
| 28 January | SA Downhill Cup | (South Africa) Sabie | 2 | Théo Erlangsen (RSA); Frances Du Toit (RSA) | Rory Kirk (RSA); Arielle Behr (RSA) | Ross Kew (RSA); Sabine Thies (RSA) | |

=== February ===
| Date | Race Name | Location | Class | Winner | Second | Third | Ref |
|---|---|---|---|---|---|---|---|
| 1–4 February | III LA Leyenda de Tartessos - XCMS | (Spain) El Rompido | S2 | Alexey Medvedev; Mónica Calderón (COL) | Pablo Rodríguez (ESP); Tessa Kortekaas (NED) | Miguel Muñoz (ESP); Rosa van Doorn (NED) | |
| 2–4 February | Copa Internacional UCI Santiago 2024 | (Chile) Santiago | 1 | Martín Vidaurre (CHI) (XCO); Catalina Vidaurre (CHI) (XCO); Martín Vidaurre (CHI) (XCC); Catalina Vidaurre (CHI) (XCC) | Alex Malacarne (BRA) (XCO); Hercília Najara (BRA) (XCO); José Gabriel Marques (BRA) (XCC); Hercília Najara (BRA) (XCC) | José Gabriel Marques (BRA) (XCO); Carolina Flores (MEX) (XCO); Alex Malacarne (BRA) (XCC); Yarela Gonzalez (CHI) (XCC) | |
| 3 February | Volcat Platja D'aro E-1 | (Spain) Castell d'Aro | 3 | Sam Gaze (NZL); Savilia Blunk (USA) | Cole Paton (USA); Costanza Fasolis (ITA) | Peeter Pruus (EST); Alba Soles (ESP) | |
| 4 February | Volcat Platja D'aro E-2 | (Spain) Castell d'Aro | 3 | Sam Gaze (NZL); Savilia Blunk (USA) | Cole Paton (USA); Costanza Fasolis (ITA) | Xavier Ariza (ESP); Léa Brette (FRA) | |
| 8–11 February | Mediterranean Epic - XCMS | (Spain) Oropesa del Mar | SHC | Wout Alleman (BEL); Rosa van Doorn (NED) | Georg Egger (GER); Hannah Otto (USA) | Marc Stutzmann (SUI); Janina Wüst (SUI) | |
| 8–11 February | Momentum Medical Scheme Tankwa Trek | (South Africa) Ceres | S1 | Matthew Beers (RSA); Alex Miller (NAM); Candice Lill (RSA); Mona Mitterwallner (AUT) | Marco Joubert (RSA); Wessel Botha (RSA); Janika Lõiv (EST); Yana Belomoyna (UKR) | Simon Schneller (GER); Axel Roudil-Cortinat (FRA); Vera Looser (NAM); Danielle Strydom (RSA) | |
| 9 February | Israel Spring Round - Mishmar Haemek | (Israel) Mishmar HaEmek | 2 | Tomer Zaltsman (ISR); Na'ama Noyman (ISR) | Gil Ly Gonen (ISR); Naomi Luria (ISR) | Eitan Levi (ISR); Romi Veldnizki (ISR) | |
| 9–11 February | HERO Abu Dhabi | (United Arab Emirates) Abu Dhabi | 1 | Ben Oliver (NZL) (XCO); Rebecca Henderson (AUS) (XCO); Thomas Litscher (SUI) (XCC); Rebecca Henderson (AUS) (XCC) | Thomas Litscher (SUI) (XCO); Noëlle Buri (SUI) (XCO); Luca Braidot (ITA) (XCC); Martina Berta (ITA) (XCC) | David List (GER) (XCO); Martina Berta (ITA) (XCO); Ben Oliver (NZL) (XCC); Noëlle Buri (SUI) (XCC) | |
| 10–11 February | Shimano Supercup Massi La Nucía | (Spain) La Nucia | 1 | Tom Pidcock (GBR); Pauline Ferrand-Prévot (FRA) | Sam Gaze (NZL); Nicole Koller (SUI) | David Valero (ESP); Savilia Blunk (USA) | |
| 16 February | Israel Spring Round-3 - Lahav Forest-1 | (Israel) Lahav | 2 | Tomer Zaltsman (ISR); Na'ama Noyman (ISR) | Gil Ly Gonen (ISR); Romi Veldnizki (ISR) | Tomer Caspi (ISR); Renan Gilmore (ISR) | |
| 17 February | Kizilalan MTB Cup | (Turkey) Antalya | 2 | Dmytro Titarenko (UKR); Alina Sarkulova (KAZ) | Oleksandr Hudyma (UKR); Tatyana Geneleva (KAZ) | Amando Martínez (MEX); Iryna Slobodyan (UKR) | |
| 17–18 February | Internacionales Chelva Gsport Challenge | (Spain) Chelva | HC | Vlad Dascălu (ROU); Savilia Blunk (USA) | Sam Gaze (NZL); Evie Richards (GBR) | David Valero (ESP); Yana Belomoyna (UKR) | |
| 17–18 February | Costa Rican Open of Downhill | (Costa Rica) Cartago | 2 | Camilo Sánchez Salazar (COL); Rachel Pageau (CAN) | Tyler Ervin (USA) | Pablo Aguilar Omodeo (CRC) | |
| 18 February | Kizilalan MTB Cup | (Turkey) Antalya | 1 | Dmytro Titarenko (UKR); Alina Sarkulova (KAZ) | Denis Sergiyenko (KAZ); Eleftheria Giachou (GRE) | Amando Martínez (MEX); Tatyana Geneleva (KAZ) | |
| 21 February | Tropical MTB Challenge - 2 | (Puerto Rico) Salinas | 1 | Christopher Blevins (USA); Gwendalyn Gibson (USA) | Martín Vidaurre (CHI); Ella MacPhee (CAN) | Léandre Bouchard (CAN); Karen Olímpio (BRA) | |
| 21 February | Cyprus Sunshine Cup #1 | (Cyprus) Amathus | 1 | Gil Ly Gonen (ISR); Anne Terpstra (NED) | Oleksandr Hudyma (UKR); Jitka Čábelická (CZE) | Jan Sáska (CZE); Lotte Koopmans (NED) | |
| 23–25 February | Tropical Mountain Bike Challenge | (Puerto Rico) Salinas | HC | Martín Vidaurre (CHI) (XCO); Gwendalyn Gibson (USA) (XCO); Christopher Blevins (USA) (XCC); Gwendalyn Gibson (USA) (XCC); Jacob Morales (PUR) (Downhill) (Downhill) | Riley Amos (USA) (XCO); Ella MacPhee (CAN) (XCO); Martín Vidaurre (CHI) (XCC); Karen Olímpio (BRA) (XCC); Guillermo Sierra (PUR) (Downhill) (Downhill) | Ulan Bastos Galinski (BRA) (XCO); Karen Olímpio (BRA) (XCO); Riley Amos (USA) (XCC); Ella MacPhee (CAN) (XCC); Xavier Diaz (PUR) (Downhill) (Downhill) | |
| 23–25 February | Copa Internacional UCI Armada de Chile Talcahuano 2024 | (Chile) Talcahuano | 1 | Patricio Farías Díaz (CHI) (XCO); Catalina Vidaurre (CHI) (XCO); Nicolás Delich (CHI) (XCC); Catalina Vidaurre (CHI) (XCC) | Ignacio Gallo Florido (CHI) (XCO); Raiza Goulão (BRA) (XCO); Ignacio Gallo Florido (CHI) (XCC); Yarela González (CHI) (XCC) | Ángelo Zancan (ARG) (XCO); Yarela González (CHI) (XCO); Patricio Farías Díaz (CHI) (XCC); Raiza Goulão (BRA) (XCC) | |
| 24 February | Red Bull Hardline Australia | (Australia) Maydena | 3 | Ronan Dunne (IRL); Gracey Hemstreet (CAN) | Bernard Kerr (GBR); Louise Ferguson (GBR) | George Brannigan (NZL) | |
| 24 February | Cyprus Sunshine Cup #2 | (Cyprus) Tochni | 1 | Oleksandr Hudyma (UKR); Anne Terpstra (NED) | Gil Ly Gonen (ISR); Lotte Koopmans (NED) | Dmytro Titarenko (UKR); Jitka Čábelická (CZE) | |
| 24–25 February | Shimano Supercup Massi Banyoles | (Spain) Banyoles | HC | Victor Koretzky (FRA); Pauline Ferrand-Prévot (FRA) | Jordan Sarrou (FRA); Jolanda Neff (SUI) | Titouan Carod (FRA); Savilia Blunk (USA) | |
| 24–25 February | Downhill Internacional Serra do Caramulo - Santiago de Besteiros | (Portugal) Tondela | 2 | Jack Reading (GBR); Joana Nunes (POR) | Pau Menoyo Busquets (ESP); Patrícia Lourenço (POR) | José Borges (POR) | |
| 24–25 February | Circuito Nicolas Machado de XCO 2024 | (Brazil) Patrocínio | 2 | José Gabriel Marques (BRA); Isabella Lacerda (BRA) | Nicolas Rafhael Amancio (BRA); Carolina Ferreira (BRA) | Halysson Ferreira (BRA); Danielle Moraes (BRA) | |
| 25 February | Cyprus Sunshine Cup #3 | (Cyprus) Macheras | 1 | Dmytro Titarenko (UKR); Anne Terpstra (NED) | Oleksandr Hudyma (UKR); Lotte Koopmans (NED) | Jan Škarnitzl (CZE); Jitka Čábelická (CZE) | |
| 26 February – 2 March | Andalucía Bike Race | (Spain) Bedmar y Garcíez/Córdoba | SHC | Fabian Rabensteiner (ITA); Samuele Porro (ITA); Janina Wüst (SUI); Rosa van Doorn (NED) | Wout Alleman (BEL); Hans Becking (NED); Meritxell Figueras Garangou (ESP); Claudia Peretti (ITA) | Marc Stutzmann (SUI); Andreas Seewald (GER); Tessa Kortekaas (NED); Mónica Calderón (COL) | |
| 28 February | Greek MTB Series – Salamina Epic Race #1 | (Greece) Salamis Island | 1 | Filippo Colombo (SUI); Candice Lill (RSA) | Tomer Zaltsman (ISR); Kate Courtney (USA) | Mathis Azzaro (FRA); Greta Seiwald (ITA) | |
| 29 February | Greek MTB Series – Salamina Epic Race #2 | (Greece) Salamis Island | 1 | Filippo Colombo (SUI); Candice Lill (RSA) | Mathis Azzaro (FRA); Kate Courtney (USA) | Tomer Zaltsman (ISR); Greta Seiwald (ITA) | |

=== March ===
| Date | Race Name | Location | Class | Winner | Second | Third | Ref |
|---|---|---|---|---|---|---|---|
| 1–2 March | Paarl XCO | (South Africa) Paarl | 2 | Simon Andreassen (DEN); Mona Mitterwallner (AUT) | Alan Hatherly (RSA); Danielle Strydom (RSA) | Alex Miller (NAM); Faranak Partoazar (IRI) | |
| 1–3 March | Copa Internacional UCI CMPC-Angol 2024 | (Chile) Angol | 1 | Patricio Farías (CHI) (XCC); Catalina Vidaurre (CHI) (XCC); Patricio Farías (CHI) (XCO); Catalina Vidaurre (CHI) (XCO) | Nicolás Delich Pardo (CHI) (XCC); Raiza Goulão (BRA) (XCC); Ignacio Gallo Florido (CHI) (XCO); Raiza Goulão (BRA) (XCO) | Ignacio Gallo Florido (CHI) (XCC); Yarela González (CHI) (XCC); Nicolás Delich Pardo (CHI) (XCO); Yarela González (CHI) (XCO) | |
| 1–3 March | #1 Internacional MTB Series | (Brazil) Lavras | 1 | Luiz Cocuzzi (BRA) (XCC); Karen Olímpio (BRA) (XCC); Ulan Bastos Galinski (BRA) (XCO); Karen Olímpio (BRA) (XCO) | José Gabriel Marques (BRA) (XCC); Hercília Najara (BRA) (XCC); Diego Arias (COL) (XCO); Hercília Najara (BRA) (XCO) | Cainã Guimarães (BRA) (XCC); Sabrina Oliveira (BRA) (XCC); Nicolas Rafhael Machado (BRA) (XCO); Sabrina Oliveira (BRA) (XCO) | |
| 2–3 March | Greek MTB Series – Salamina Epic Race #3 | (Greece) Salamis Island | HC | Filippo Colombo (SUI); Candice Lill (RSA) | Sebastian Fini Carstensen (DEN); Kate Courtney (USA) | Max Foidl (AUT); Greta Seiwald (ITA) | |
| 2–3 March | VTT Chabrieres | (France) Guéret | 1 | Luca Schwarzbauer (GER); Noémie Garnier (FRA) | Jens Schuermans (BEL); Léna Gérault (FRA) | Loan Cheneval (FRA); Flavie Guille (FRA) | |
| 2–3 March | Puerto Rico MTB Cup | (Puerto Rico) Rincón | 1 | Zorak Paille (CAN) (XCC); Gwendalyn Gibson (USA) (XCC); Riley Amos (USA) (XCO); Gwendalyn Gibson (USA) (XCO) | Riley Amos (USA) (XCC); Carolina Flores (MEX) (XCC); Alex Malacarne (BRA) (XCO); Carolina Flores (MEX) (XCO) | Alex Malacarne (BRA) (XCC); Madison Maloney (USA) (XCC); Tyler Orschel (CAN) (XCO); Ella MacPhee (CAN) (XCO) | |
| 2–3 March | Portugal Cup XCO - Melgaço International XCO | (Portugal) Melgaço | 1 | Vlad Dascălu (ROU); Chiara Teocchi (ITA) | Mário Costa (POR); Raquel Queirós (POR) | Alberto Barroso (ESP); Ana Santos (POR) | |
| 2–3 March | Gran Premio Internacional Candeleda-Gredos | (Spain) Candeleda | 1 | David Valero (ESP); Janika Lõiv (EST) | Jofre Cullell (ESP); Estíbaliz Sagardoy (ESP) | Cristofer Bosque Ruano (ESP); Merili Sirvel (EST) | |
| 3 March | Verona MTB International | (Italy) Verona | 2 | Juri Zanotti (ITA); Laura Stigger (AUT) | Luca Braidot (ITA); Giorgia Marchet (ITA) | Gregor Raggl (AUT); Vita Movrin (SVN) | |
| 3 March | AusCycling MTB National Series | (Australia) Canberra | 2 | Jack Ward (AUS); Rebecca Henderson (AUS) | Daniel McConnell (AUS); Zoe Cuthbert (AUS) | Reece Tucknott (AUS); Katherine Hosking (AUS) | |
| 3 March | Valparaiso Cerro Abajo | (Chile) Valparaíso | 3 | Lucas Borba (BRA) | Felipe Agurto Galleguillos (CHI) | Adrien Loron (FRA) | |
| 3 March | Reino De Los Mallos Enduro Bike Race | (Spain) Las Peñas de Riglos | 3 | Juan Gabriel Torralba Garasa (ESP); Cristina Menéndez (ESP) | Marco Veiga (ESP); Nastasia Giménez (FRA) | Borja Pérez Esteban (ESP); Sara Yusto (ESP) | |
| 5–9 March | TransAndes Challenge - Décimo Quinta Edición - XCMS | (Chile) Araucanía Region | S2 | Luiz Miguel Honório (BRA); Naima Diesner (GER) | Ignacio Gallo Florido (CHI) | Carlos Fernandes Olímpio (BRA) | |
| 7 March | Greek MTB Series - Sparta MTB Race #1 | (Greece) Sparta | 1 | Leon Kaiser (GER); Kate Courtney (USA) | Bradyn Lange (USA); Candice Lill (RSA) | Andri Frischknecht (SUI); Kelsey Urban (USA) | |
| 8–9 March | XCO Coppa Città di Albenga | (Italy) Albenga | 1 | Victor Koretzky (FRA); Chiara Teocchi (ITA) | Titouan Carod (FRA); Giada Specia (ITA) | Juri Zanotti (ITA); Martina Berta (ITA) | |
| 8–10 March | Internacional Chaoyang Estrada Real | (Brazil) Arcos | 1 | Luiz Cocuzzi (BRA) (XCC); Iara Caetano (BRA) (XCC); Ulan Bastos Galinski (BRA) (XCO); Hercília Najara (BRA) (XCO) | Ulan Bastos Galinski (BRA) (XCC); Hercília Najara (BRA) (XCC); Luiz Cocuzzi (BRA) (XCO); Isabella Lacerda (BRA) (XCO) | Alex Malacarne (BRA) (XCC); Ana Laura Oliveira Moraes (BRA) (XCC); Diego Arias (COL) (XCO); Liege Walter (BRA) (XCO) | |
| 9 March | Far West Race - XCM | (Spain) Calatayud | 2 | Sergio Mantecón Gutiérrez (ESP); Meritxell Figueras Garangou (ESP) | Marek Rauchfuss (CZE); Karla Löffelmann (CZE) | Tiago Ferreira (POR); Marta Torà Milà (ESP) | |
| 9–10 March | Greek MTB Series - Sparta MTB Race #2 | (Greece) Sparta | 1 | Emil Hasund Eid (NOR); Kate Courtney (USA) | Andri Frischknecht (SUI); Kelsey Urban (USA) | Leon Kaiser (GER); Candice Lill (RSA) | |
| 9–10 March | Fullgaz Race int. MTB Bundesliga | (Germany) Obergessertshausen | 1 | Niklas Schehl (GER) (XCC); Lia Schrievers (GER) (XCC); Luca Schwarzbauer (GER) (XCO); Nina Benz (GER) (XCO) | Maximilian Brandl (GER) (XCC); Andrea Kravanja (GER) (XCC); Mario Bair (AUT) (XCO); Lia Schrievers (GER) (XCO) | Julian Schelb (GER) (XCC); Nina Benz (GER) (XCC); David List (GER) (XCO); Kira Böhm (GER) (XCO) | |
| 10 March | Gran Premio Ciudad de Valladolid BTT XCO | (Spain) Valladolid | 2 | Didac Carvacho (ESP); Estíbaliz Sagardoy (ESP) | Cristofer Bosque (ESP); Núria Bosch (ESP) | Jaume Bosch (ESP); Lucía Macho (ESP) | |
| 10 March | Green Series XCO Bilbao 2024 | (Spain) Bilbao | 2 | Francesc Barber (ESP); Janika Lõiv (EST) | Miguel Ramírez de Arellano (ESP); Olivia Onesti (FRA) | Unai Mateos (ESP); Merili Sirvel (EST) | |
| 10 March | Argovia Vittoria-Fischer Cup: Capriasca Challenge | (Switzerland) Tesserete | 2 | Filippo Colombo (SUI); Paula Gorycka (POL) | Simon Walter (SUI); Jana Glaus (SUI) | Nick Bürki (SUI); Chrystelle Baumann (SUI) | |
| 15–17 March | MTB French Cup - XCO/XCC/XCE | (France) Marseille | HC | Victor Koretzky (FRA) (XCO); Pauline Ferrand-Prévot (FRA) (XCO); Victor Koretzky (FRA) (XCC); Loana Lecomte (FRA) (XCC); Titouan Perrin-Ganier (FRA) (XCE); Didi de Vries (NED) (XCE) | Joshua Dubau (FRA) (XCO); Savilia Blunk (USA) (XCO); Adrien Boichis (FRA) (XCC); Pauline Ferrand-Prévot (FRA) (XCC); Antoine Tran Van (FRA) (XCE); Amandine Vidon (FRA) (XCE) | Jordan Sarrou (FRA) (XCO); Laura Stigger (AUT) (XCO); Mathis Azzaro (FRA) (XCC); Laura Stigger (AUT) (XCC); Lorenzo Serres (FRA) (XCE); Coline Clauzure (FRA) (XCE) | |
| 16 March | #1 – CIMTB – Nova Lima – XCC Class 3 – Elite | (Brazil) Nova Lima | 3 | Luiz Cocuzzi (BRA); Raiza Goulão (BRA) | Alex Malacarne (BRA); Iara Caetano (BRA) | Diego Arias (COL); Isabella Lacerda (BRA) | |
| 16 March | Hellenic XCC Series #2 | (Greece) Kilkis | 3 | Alexandros Athanasiadis (GRE); Eleftheria Giachou (GRE) | Dimitrios Antoniadis (GRE); Eirini Maria Karousou (GRE) | Charoun Molla (GRE); Alexandra Adam (GRE) | |
| 16 March | Copa Catalana Internacional BTT Biking Point Gavà | (Spain) Gavà | 2 | Jofre Cullell (ESP); Karla Löffelmann (CZE) | Marek Rauchfuss (CZE); Núria Bosch (ESP) | Didac Carvacho (ESP); Alice Pirard (BEL) | |
| 16–17 March | #1 Internazionali d'Italia Series | (Italy) San Zeno di Montagna | 1 | Luca Braidot (ITA); Martina Berta (ITA) | Simone Avondetto (ITA); Chiara Teocchi (ITA) | Filippo Fontana (ITA); Giada Specia (ITA) | |
| 16–17 March | CIC On Swiss Bike Cup - Gränichen | (Switzerland) Gränichen | 1 | Lars Forster (SUI); Alessandra Keller (SUI) | Vital Albin (SUI); Jolanda Neff (SUI) | Luca Schätti (SUI); Monique Halter (SUI) | |
| 16–17 March | Portugal Cup DHI | (Portugal) Seia | 1 | Ethan Craik (GBR); Marine Cabirou (FRA) | Loïc Bruni (FRA); Lisa Baumann (SUI) | Loris Vergier (FRA); Phoebe Gale (GBR) | |
| 16–24 March | Crankworx Rotorua Downhill | (New Zealand) Rotorua | 1 | Lachlan Stevens-McNab (NZL); Eliana Hulsebosch (NZL) | Jakob Jewett (CAN); Jessica Blewitt (NZL) | Samuel Blenkinsop (NZL); Shania Rawson (NZL) | |
| 17 March | Aydın MTB Cup | (Turkey) Aydın | 2 | Oleksandr Hudyma (UKR); Alina Sarkulova (KAZ) | Ede-Károly Molnár (ROU); Tatyana Geneleva (KAZ) | Dmytro Titarenko (UKR); Ana Ruth Clark (MEX) | |
| 17 March | XCO Internacional Torrenueva Costa-Miranda Bike | (Spain) Torrenueva Costa | 2 | David Valero (ESP); Raquel Queirós (POR) | Maciej Jeziorski (POL); Barbara Borowiecka (POL) | Adrián Plaza Jarque (ESP); Paula Martín Varo (ESP) | |
| 17 March | Superprestigio MTB | (Spain) Ancín – Antzin | 1 | David Campos (ESP); Janika Lõiv (EST) | Jofre Cullell (ESP); Estíbaliz Sagardoy (ESP) | Mário Costa (POR); Joana Monteiro (POR) | |
| 17 March | Hellenic XCOMountain Bike #1 | (Greece) Kilkis | 3 | Dimitrios Antoniadis (GRE); Eleftheria Giachou (GRE) | Alexandros Athanasiadis (GRE); Eirini Maria Karousou (GRE) | Charoun Molla (GRE); Alexandra Adam (GRE) | |
| 17 March | XCO Losinj | (Croatia) Mali Lošinj | 1 | Rok Naglič (SVN); Gabriela Wojtyła (POL) | Tomáš Ševců (CZE); Vita Movrin (SVN) | Lukas Malezsewski (BEL); Isla Short (GBR) | |
| 17 March | #1 – CIMTB – Nova Lima – XCO Class 1 – Elite | (Brazil) Nova Lima | 1 | Luiz Cocuzzi (BRA); Raiza Goulão (BRA) | José Gabriel Marques (BRA); Hercília Najara (BRA) | Alex Malacarne (BRA); Giuliana Salvini (BRA) | |
| 17–24 March | Absa Cape Epic - XCMS | (South Africa) Cape Town | SHC | Matthew Beers (RSA); Howard Grotts (USA); Anne Terpstra (NED); Nicole Koller (SUI) | Nino Schurter (SUI); Sebastian Fini Carstensen (DEN); Mona Mitterwallner (AUT); Candice Lill (RSA) | Hans Becking (NED); Wout Alleman (BEL); Sofía Gómez Villafañe (ARG); Samara Sheppard (NZL) | |
| 22 March | Serbia Epic Series – Andrevlje XCO C1 | (Serbia) Novi Sad | 1 | Jens Schuermans (BEL); Isla Short (GBR) | Pierre de Froidmont (BEL); Emeline Detilleux (BEL) | Dmytro Titarenko (UKR); Julie Lillelund (DEN) | |
| 23 March | USA MTB Cup – Orange Seal Pro Cup | (United States) Temecula | 1 | Christopher Blevins (USA); Haley Batten (USA) | Adair Prieto (MEX); Jennifer Jackson (CAN) | Bradyn Lange (USA); Gwendalyn Gibson (USA) | |
| 23 March | Tennessee National DHI | (United States) Oliver Springs | 1 | Dakotah Norton (USA); Frida Rønning (NOR) | Dane Jewett (CAN); Kailey Skelton (USA) | Austin Dooley (USA); Matilda Melton (USA) | |
| 23 March | Serbia Epic Series – Andrevlje XCO C1 | (Serbia) Novi Sad | 1 | Jens Schuermans (BEL); Emeline Detilleux (BEL) | Pierre de Froidmont (BEL); Julie Lillelund (DEN) | Martin Farstadvoll (NOR); Szonja Greman (HUN) | |
| 23 March | Tennessee National XCC | (United States) Oliver Springs | 1 | Noah Ramsay (CAN); Madison Maloney (USA) | Jack Spranger (USA); Nicole Bradbury (CAN) | Owen Clark (CAN); Chloe Fraser (USA) | |
| 23–24 March | Portugal Cup DHI | (Portugal) Carvoeiro | 2 | Max Hartenstern (GER); Lisa Baumann (SUI) | Antoine Vidal (FRA); Mikayla Parton (GBR) | Simon Chapelet (FRA); Lisa Bouladou (FRA) | |
| 24 March | CIC On Swiss Bike Cup - Tamaro Trophy | (Switzerland) Rivera | HC | Jordan Sarrou (FRA); Pauline Ferrand-Prévot (FRA) | Joshua Dubau (FRA); Jolanda Neff (SUI) | Adrien Boichis (FRA); Alessandra Keller (SUI) | |
| 24 March | Tennessee National XCO | (United States) Oliver Springs | 1 | Cole Punchard (CAN); Ana Maria Roa (COL) | Tyler Orschel (CAN); Chloe Fraser (USA) | Raphael Auclair (CAN); Tessa Greep (USA) | |
| 24 March | Copa Catalana Internacional BTT Biking Point Corró D'Amunt | (Spain) Corró d'Amunt | 2 | Jofre Cullell (ESP); Marta Cano (ESP) | Didac Carvacho (ESP); Karla Löffelmann (CZE) | Marek Rauchfuss (CZE); Núria Bosch Picó (ESP) | |
| 24 March | Serbia Epic Series – Andrevlje XCO C2 | (Serbia) Novi Sad | 1 | Fabian Eder (GER); Isla Short (GBR) | Benjamin Krüger (GER); Antonia Weeger (GER) | Emanuele Huez (ITA); Julie Lillelund (DEN) | |
| 24 March | 32. KTM Kamptal Trophy | (Austria) Langenlois | 1 | Mario Bair (AUT); Leonie Daubermann (GER) | Ondřej Cink (CZE); Aleksandra Podgórska (POL) | Krzysztof Łukasik (POL); Ronja Eibl (GER) | |
| 24 March | XCO Vrtojba | (Slovenia) Vrtojba | 1 | Daniele Braidot (ITA); Anne Tauber (NED) | Rok Naglič (SVN); Yana Belomoyna (UKR) | Tommaso Ferri (ITA); Giorgia Marchet (ITA) | |
| 24 March | XVI GP Ayto Erandio - Green Series XCO - Akarlanda | (Spain) Erandio | 2 | David Valero (ESP); Olivia Onesti (FRA) | Raúl Villar Blanco (ESP); Estíbaliz Sagardoy (ESP) | Miguel Rámirez de Arellano (ESP); Ainara Elbusto (ESP) | |
| 29 March | Israel Cup Kule | (Israel) Kule | 1 | Tomer Zaltsman (ISR); Na'ama Noyman (ISR) | Gil Ly Gonen (ISR); Naomi Luria (ISR) | Ede-Károly Molnár (ROU); Zohar Bar Joseph (ISR) | |
| 29–31 March | SA XCO Cup Series | (South Africa) Gauteng | 1 | Luke Moir (RSA) (XCC); Tyler Jacobs (RSA) (XCC); Alan Hatherly (RSA) (XCO); Tyler Jacobs (RSA) (XCO) | Alan Hatherly (RSA) (XCC); Lilian Baber (RSA) (XCC); Ernest Roets (RSA) (XCO); Lilian Baber (RSA) (XCO) | Daniel Van Der Watt (RSA) (XCC); Karlise Scheepers (RSA) (XCC); Luke Moir (RSA) (XCO); Karlise Scheepers (RSA) (XCO) | |
| 30 March | AC Heating Cup Stupno - Horská kola Stupno | (Czech Republic) Břasy | 2 | Ondřej Cink (CZE); Patricie Srnská (CZE) | Jan Zatloukal (CZE); Gabriela Wojtyła (POL) | Filip Helta (POL); Adéla Holubová (CZE) | |
| 30–31 March | Internacional Chaoyang Estrada Real | (Brazil) Itabirito | 1 | Sam Fox (AUS) (XCC); Sabrina Oliveira (BRA) (XCC); Ulan Bastos Galinski (BRA) (XCO); Hercília Najara (BRA) (XCO) | Ulan Bastos Galinski (BRA) (XCC); Letícia Cândido (BRA) (XCC); José Gabriel Marques (BRA) (XCO); Liege Walter (BRA) (XCO) | Cainã Guimarães (BRA) (XCC); Ana Laura Oliveira (BRA) (XCC); Luiz Cocuzzi (BRA) (XCO); Ana Laura Oliveira (BRA) (XCO) | |
| 30–31 March | #2 Internazionali d'Italia Series | (Italy) Esanatoglia | 1 | Cameron Orr (GBR); Sofie Heby Pedersen (DEN) | Simon Andreassen (DEN); Giorgia Marchet (ITA) | Charlie Aldridge (GBR); Lucia Bramati (ITA) | |
| 30 March | Volcat BTT Igualada - XCO E1 | (Spain) Igualada | 3 | Marek Rauchfuss (CZE); Karla Löffelmann (CZE) | Hugo Drechou (FRA); Melissa Maia (POR) | Diego Arias (COL); Cristina Morán (ESP) | |
| 30 March | Bikerennen Arbon | (Switzerland) Arbon | 3 | Simon Vitzthum (SUI); Jolanda Neff (SUI) | Andrin Walter (SUI); Vera Schmid (SUI) | Livio Stefani (SUI); Jana Pallweber (ITA) | |
| 31 March | 3 Nations Cup: Zwiep Scott Cup - XCO | (Netherlands) Oldenzaal | 2 | Rens Teunissen Van Manen (NED); Grace Inglis (GBR) | Jarne Vandersteen (BEL); Lotte Koopmans (NED) | Berden de Vries (NED); Femke Mossinkoff (NED) | |
| 31 March | Serbia EPIC ŠKODA Požarevac XCO #2 | (Serbia) Požarevac | 1 | Dmytro Titarenko (UKR); Virág Buzsáki (HUN) | Volodymyr Obukhivskyi (UKR); Alina Sarkulova (KAZ) | Amando Martínez (MEX); Maria Sherstiuk (UKR) | |
| 31 March | Volcat BTT Igualada - XCO E2 | (Spain) Igualada | 3 | Marek Rauchfuss (CZE); Karla Löffelmann (CZE) | Hugo Drechou (FRA); Melissa Maia (POR) | Diego Arias (COL); Cristina Morán (ESP) | |

=== April ===
| Date | Race Name | Location | Class | Winner | Second | Third | Ref |
|---|---|---|---|---|---|---|---|
| 3 April | US Pro Cup | (United States) Fayetteville | 1 | Christopher Blevins (USA); Jennifer Jackson (CAN) | Riley Amos (USA); Ella MacPhee (CAN) | Carter Woods (CAN); Makena Kellerman (USA) | |
| 4–7 April | MTB Festival | (Brazil) Mairiporã | 1 | Ulan Bastos Galinski (BRA) (XCC); Karen Olímpio (BRA) (XCC); Joshua Dubau (FRA) (XCO); Savilia Blunk (USA) (XCO) | Adrien Boichis (FRA) (XCC); Giuliana Salvini Morgen (BRA) (XCC); Filippo Colombo (SUI) (XCO); Haley Batten (USA) (XCO) | Sam Fox (AUS) (XCC); Zoe Cuthbert (AUS) (XCC); Mathias Flückiger (SUI) (XCO); Jenny Rissveds (SWE) | |
| 4–7 April | Monster Energy Pro Downhill Series - Rock Creek | (United States) Zirconia | 2 | Dakotah Norton (USA); Aletha Ostgaard (USA) | Austin Dooley (USA); Frida Helena Rønning (USA) | Luca Shaw (USA); Erice van Leuven (NZL) | |
| 5–6 April | Marlene Südtirol Sunshine Race | (Italy) Nals | HC | Mathis Azzaro (FRA) (XCC); Pauline Ferrand-Prévot (FRA) (XCC); Simone Avondetto (ITA) (XCO); Pauline Ferrand-Prévot (FRA) (XCO) | Filippo Fontana (ITA) (XCC); Nina Benz (GER) (XCC); Luca Schätti (SUI) (XCO); Giada Specia (ITA) (XCO) | Emil Hasund Eid (NOR) (XCC); Elisabeth Brandau (GER) (XCC); Filippo Fontana (ITA) (XCO); Nina Benz (GER) (XCO) | |
| 5–6 April | US Pro Cup | (United States) Fayetteville | HC | Christopher Blevins (USA) (XCC); Jennifer Jackson (CAN) (XCC); Riley Amos (USA) (XCO); Jennifer Jackson (CAN) (XCO) | Carter Woods (CAN) (XCC); Bailey Cioppa (USA) (XCC); Carter Woods (CAN) (XCO); Ella MacPhee (CAN) (XCO) | Jens Schuermans (BEL) (XCC); Makena Kellerman (USA) (XCC); Cole Punchard (COL) (XCO); Makena Kellerman (USA) (XCO) | |
| 6 April | 11ª Jamón Bike - XCM | (Spain) Calamocha | 2 | Martin Frey (GER); Mónica Calderón (COL) | Pau Marzà Bedòs (ESP); Pilar Fernández (ESP) | Jorge Lamiel Repullés (ESP); Joana Puig Caralt (ESP) | |
| 6–7 April | Abrantes - XCO | (Portugal) Abrantes | 1 | Mário Costa (POR); Joana Monteiro (POR) | Diogo Neves (POR); Raquel Queirós (POR) | Roberto Ferreira (POR); Ana Santos (POR) | |
| 6–7 April | CIC On Swiss Bike Cup - Lugano XCO | (Switzerland) Lugano | 1 | Thomas Griot (FRA); Paula Gorycka (POL) | Marcel Guerrini (SUI); Elina Benoit (SUI) | Fabio Püntener (SUI); Seraina Leugger (SUI) | |
| 6–7 April | Copa Colombia MTB GW Shimano 1 | (Colombia) Ibagué | 2 | Jonathan David Cantor (COL) (XCC); Gloria Garzón (COL) (XCC); Juan Fernando Monroy (COL) (XCO); Gloria Garzón (COL) (XCO) | Juan Fernando Monroy (COL) (XCC); Camila Cagua (COL) (XCC); Jonathan David Cantor (COL) (XCO); Camila Cagua (COL) (XCO) | Jhonnatan Botero Villegas (COL) (XCC); Diana Pinilla (COL) (XCC); Hilvar Malaver Calderón (COL) (XCO); Diana Pinilla (COL) (XCO) | |
| 7 April | Watersley XCO Challenge | (Netherlands) Sittard | 1 | Chris van Dijk (NED); Lotte Koopmans (NED) | Oscar Lind (SWE); Flavie Guille (FRA) | Rens Teunissen van Manen (NED); Romana Carfora (NED) | |
| 7 April | Izmir MTB Cup | (Turkey) İzmir | 2 | Dmytro Titarenko (UKR); Iryna Slobodyan (UKR) | Amando Martínez (MEX); Maria Sherstiuk (UKR) | Emre Yavuz (TUR); Azize Bekar (TUR) | |
| 7 April | Shimano Supercup Massi Santa Susanna | (Spain) Santa Susanna | 1 | Jofre Cullell (ESP); Linn Gustafsson (SWE) | David Valero (ESP); Marta Cano Espinosa (ESP) | Loan Cheneval (FRA); Isaure Medde (FRA) | |
| 12 April | Israel Cup3 Kule | (Israel) Mishmar HaEmek | 2 | Amando Martínez (MEX); Ana Ruth Clark (MEX) | Tomer Caspi (ISR); Naomi Luria (ISR) | Nir Tchwella (ISR); Zohar Bar Joseph (ISR) | |
| 12 April | Piney Hills Classic | (United States) Ruston | 2 | Tyler Orschel (CAN); Fátima Híjar Marín (MEX) | Jack Spranger (USA); Katherine Wood (USA) | Lasse Konecny (USA); Isabella Robles (USA) | |
| 13 April | XCO Premantura Rocky Trails | (Croatia) Premantura | 1 | Sven Strähle (GER); Emeline Detilleux (BEL) | Rok Naglič (SVN); Giorgia Marchet (ITA) | Fabian Eder (GER); Gabriela Wojtyła (POL) | |
| 13 April | Piney Hills Classic | (United States) Ruston | 2 | Jack Spranger (USA); Fátima Híjar Marín (MEX) | Tyler Orschel (CAN); Katherine Wood (USA) | Lasse Konecny (USA); Emma Calvert (USA) | |
| 13 April | AC Heating Cup Stříbro - Velká cena KION Group | (Czech Republic) Stříbro | 3 | Jan Škarnitzl (CZE); Aneta Novotná (CZE) | Patrik Černý (CZE); Milena Drelak (POL) | Lukáš Kobes (CZE); Gabriela Janowicz (POL) | |
| 13–14 April | National Downhill Series - Round 1 | (United Kingdom) Rheola | 2 | Charlie Hatton (GBR); Phoebe Gale (GBR) | Joe Breeden (GBR); Heather Wilson (GBR) | Jordan Williams (GBR); Jessica Stone (GBR) | |
| 13–14 April | Garda MTB Marathon International | (Italy) Garda | 2 | Gioele De Cosmo (ITA); Adelheid Morath (GER) | Simon Stiebjahn (GER); Debora Piana (ITA) | Héctor Leonardo Páez (COL); Simona Mazzucotelli (ITA) | |
| 13–14 April | Internacional Super Cup XCO Ansião | (Portugal) Ansião | 2 | Mário Costa (POR); Joana Monteiro (POR) | Roberto Ferreira (POR); Maria Sherstiuk (UKR) | Valentin Remondet (FRA); Maaris Meier (EST) | |
| 14 April | Superprestigio MTB | (Spain) Caparroso | 1 | Ricardo Marinheiro (POR); Marta Cano Espinosa (ESP) | Felipe Orts (ESP); Estíbaliz Sagardoy (ESP) | Anthony Zaragoza (FRA); Ainara Elbusto (ESP) | |
| 16–20 April | 4 Islands MTB Croatia - XCMS | (Croatia) Baška/Cres/Mali Lošinj/Rab | S1 | Nicola Taffarel (ITA); Massimo Rosa (ITA); Janina Wüst (SUI); Rosa van Doorn (NED) | Georg Egger (GER); Lukas Baum (GER); Mónica Calderon (COL); Meritxell Figueras Garangou (ESP) | Miguel Muñoz Moreno (ESP); Luis Francisco Pérez (ESP); Janka Keseg Števková (SVK); Martina Krahulcová (SVK) | |
| 19–20 April | Namibia XC 1 | (Namibia) Windhoek | 1 | Alex Miller (NAM); Lilian Baber (RSA) | Kevin Lowe (NAM); Stacey Hyslop (ZIM) | Michael Foster (RSA); Jean-Marie Mostert (NAM) | |
| 20 April | XCO Drozdovo | (Slovakia) Nová Baňa | 1 | Filip Helta (POL); Gabriela Wojtyła (POL) | Matej Ulík (SVK); Jana Czeczinkarová (CZE) | Clément Horny (BEL); Aneta Novotná (CZE) | |
| 20 April | Templarios UCI MTB Race Jerez De Los Caballeros - XCM | (Spain) Jerez de los Caballeros | 1 | Simon Stiebjahn (GER); Cristina Morán Roza (ESP) | Jakob Hartmann (GER); Pilar Fernández (ESP) | Victor Fernández Grande (ESP); Jessica Cruz (AND) | |
| 20 April | Helaz XCO Series 1 | (Malaysia) Dungun District | 2 | Zaenal Fanani (INA); Nur Fitrah Shaari (MAS) | Muhammad Syawal Mazlin (MAS); Shagne Paula Yaoyao (PHI) | Zulfikri Zulkifli (MAS); Nur Deena Safia Nor Effandy (MAS) | |
| 20 April | Hellenic XCC Series #3 | (Greece) Mandra | 3 | Dmytro Titarenko (UKR); Emeline Detilleux (BEL) | Patrick Pescaru (ROU); Eleftheria Giachou (GRE) | Amando Martínez (MEX); Monserrat Rodríguez (MEX) | |
| 20 April | XXI MTB "Rusza Peloton" Puchar Polski II Memoriał im. Wiesława Grabka | (Poland) Ogrodniczki | 3 | Krzysztof Łukasik (POL); Matylda Szczecińska (POL) | Filip Surdyk (POL); Antonina Białek (POL) | Maciej Jeziorski (POL); Zuzanna Krzystała (POL) | |
| 20–21 April | Portugal Cup DHI | (Portugal) Ponta Delgada | 2 | Nuno Reis (POR); Joana dos Santos Nunes (POR) | Jack Reading (GBR) | Pedro Câmara (POR) | |
| 21 April | British Cycling National Cross Country Series Round 1 | (United Kingdom) Kirroughtree | 1 | Thomas Mein (GBR); Ella Maclean-Howell (GBR) | Corran Carrick-Anderson (GBR); Grace Inglis (GBR) | Max Greensill (GBR); Elena McGorum (GBR) | |
| 21 April | G. P. X-Sauce / Super Cuper MTB / Copa de Madrid MTB | (Spain) Alpedrete | 1 | Roberto Ferreira (POR); Barbara Borowiecka (POL) | Cristofer Bosque (ESP); Núria Bosch Picó (ESP) | Joan Mir Mascaró (ESP); Estíbaliz Sagardoy (ESP) | |
| 21 April | Hellenic XCO Mountain Bike #2 | (Greece) Mandra | 2 | Dmytro Titarenko (UKR); Emeline Detilleux (BEL) | Alexandros Athanasiadis (GRE); Eleftheria Giachou (GRE) | Patrick Pescaru (ROU); Maria Sherstiuk (UKR) | |
| 21 April | Marathon Cup Cambrils | (Spain) Cambrils | 2 | Ray Sanz (ESP); Claudia Arboix (ESP) | Eduardo Gómez Rojas (ESP) | Arnau Masip (ESP) | |
| 21 April | Green Series XCO Ispaster 2024 | (Spain) Ispaster | 2 | Julien Hémon (FRA); Faranak Partoazar (IRI) | Miguel Rámirez de Arellano (ESP); Sayu Bella Sukma Dewi (INA) | Nathan Célié (FRA); Ainara Elbusto (ESP) | |
| 24–27 April | sani2c Race | (South Africa) Underberg/Scottburgh | S2 | Michael Foster (RSA); Danielle Strydom (RSA) | Jaedon Terlouw (RSA); Samantha Sanders (RSA) | Arno du Toit (RSA); Bianca Haw (RSA) | |
| 25 April | XVIII BTT XCO de Vila Franca | (Portugal) Viana do Castelo | 1 | Roberto Ferreira (POR); Ana Santos (POR) | Mário Costa (POR); Joana Monteiro (POR) | Valentin Remondet (FRA); Mari-Liis Mõttus (EST) | |
| 26 April | CIMTB Araxá 20 Years: XCC Class 3 - Araxá | (Brazil) Araxá | 3 | Luiz Cocuzzi (BRA); Karen Olímpio (BRA) | Gustavo Xavier de Oliveira (BRA); Isabella Lacerda (BRA) | Nicolas Rafhael Machado (BRA); Na'ama Noyman (ISR) | |
| 26 April | City Mountainbike - XCC | (Spain) Barcelona | 3 | Ede-Károly Molnár (ROU); Gaia Tormena (ITA) | Theo Hauser (AUT); Line Mygdam (DEN) | Titouan Perrin-Ganier (FRA); Merili Sirvel (EST) | |
| 27 April | MTB Caneva Trophy | (Italy) Caneva | 1 | Gioele Bertolini (ITA); Sara Cortinovis (ITA) | Filippo Fontana (ITA); Giorgia Marchet (ITA) | Andreas Emanuele Vittone (ITA); Nicole Pesse (ITA) | |
| 27 April | Petrovaradin Fortress – BIKE FEST 2024 XCO C1 | (Serbia) Novi Sad | 1 | Andrin Gees (SUI); Janka Keseg Števková (SVK) | Matej Ulík (SVK); Monserrat Rodríguez (MEX) | Christopher Dawson (IRL); Iryna Shymanska (UKR) | |
| 27 April | Klippingracet | (Sweden) Säter | 2 | Edvin Elofsson (SWE); Linn Gustafsson (SWE) | Viktor Lindqvist (SWE); Ida Ossiansson (SWE) | Axel Lindh (SWE); Moa Gustafsson (SWE) | |
| 27–28 April | International MTB Bundesliga - Heubacher Mountainbikefestival Bike the Rock | (Germany) Heubach | HC | David List (GER); Nina Benz (GER) | Julian Schelb (GER); Lia Schrievers (GER) | Maximilian Brandl (GER); Elisabeth Brandau (GER) | |
| 27–28 April | Soon Bike days | (Norway) Son | 1 | Knut Røhme (NOR) (XCO); Sondre Rokke (NOR) (XCC); Oda Laforce (NOR) (XCO); Oda Laforce (NOR) (XCC) | Ole Sigurd Rekdahl (NOR) (XCO); Emil Hasund Eid (NOR) (XCC); Hedda Brenningen Bjørklund (NOR) (XCO); Hedda Brenningen Bjørklund (NOR) (XCC) | Emil Hasund Eid (NOR) (XCO); Martin Farstadvoll (NOR) (XCC); Thea Siggerud (NOR) (XCO); Thea Siggerud (NOR) (XCC) | |
| 27–28 April | Taça Portugal XCO | (Portugal) Lousada | 1 | Roberto Ferreira (POR); Ana Santos (POR) | Mário Costa (POR); Joana Monteiro (POR) | Diogo Neves (POR); Lara Lois García (ESP) | |
| 27–28 April | Yambol Bike Cup | (Bulgaria) Yambol | 2 | Oleksandr Koniaiev (UKR); Maria Sherstiuk (UKR) | Dmytro Titarenko (UKR); Mariia Sukhopalova (UKR) | Charoun Molla (GRE); Iryna Slobodyan (UKR) | |
| 27–28 April | Shimano MTB Liga #1 | (Denmark) Holte | 2 | Sebastian Fini (DEN); Caroline Bohé (DEN) | Oliver Sølvhøj (DEN); Malene Degn (DEN) | Mikkel Lose (DEN); Emma Lyngholm (DEN) | |
| 27–28 April | Festival Mezuena Chía | (Colombia) Chía | 3 | Juan Sebastián Castro (COL); Angie Milena Lara (COL) | Luciano Esquivias (MEX); Zharick Sandrit Madariaga (COL) | Rafael David Martínez (COL); Paula Alejandra Beltrán (COL) | |
| 28 April | #2 CIMTB - Araxá 21 Years XCO Class HC - Elite/U23 | (Brazil) Araxá | HC | Alex Malacarne (BRA); Raiza Goulão (BRA) | Ulan Bastos Galinski (BRA); Isabella Lacerda (BRA) | Diego Arias (COL); Karen Olímpio (BRA) | |
| 28 April | Roc d'Ardenne - XCM | (Belgium) Houffalize | 1 | Wout Alleman (BEL); Amanda Bohlin (SWE) | Hans Becking (NED); Romana Carfora (NED) | Jakob Hartmann (GER); Julia Grégoire (BEL) | |
| 28 April | IXS European Downhill Cup | (Croatia) Lošinj | 1 | Denis Kohút (SVK); Abigail Hogie (USA) | Simon Maurer (GER); Delphine Bulliard (SUI) | Luka Berginc (SVN); Karolína Kadlecová (CZE) | |
| 28 April | MTB Croatia Cup - Vodice | (Croatia) Vodice | 1 | Rok Naglič (SVN); Lejla Njemčević (BIH) | Lukas Hatz (AUT); Csenge Anna Bokros (HUN) | Alessio Agostinelli (ITA); Karla Kustura (BIH) | |
| 28 April | Petrovaradin Fortress – BIKE FEST 2024 XCO C1 | (Serbia) Novi Sad | 1 | Matej Ulík (SVK); Janka Keseg Števková (SVK) | Christopher Dawson (IRL); Ladina Gees (SUI) | Filip Lepka (CZE); Monserrat Rodríguez (MEX) | |
| 28 April | Shimano Supercup Massi Sabiñánigo | (Spain) Sabiñánigo | 1 | Jofre Cullell (ESP); Isabella Holmgren (CAN) | Luis Francisco Pérez (ESP); Ava Holmgren (CAN) | Léo Bartoletti (FRA); Marta Cano Espinosa (ESP) | |
| 28 April | DHI Pozo Do Demo | (Spain) Verín | 2 | Yelco Romero (ESP); Sara Yusto (ESP) | Daniel Castellanos (ESP); Kira Zamora (ESP) | Fynn Brands (NED); Marta Perxachs (ESP) | |
| 28 April | Argovia Vittoria-Fischer Cup: Lostorf | (Switzerland) Lostorf | 2 | Nick Burki (SUI); Seraina Leugger (SUI) | Fabio Püntener (SUI); Fiona Schibler (SUI) | Joris Ryf (SUI); Anina Hutter (SUI) | |
| 28 April | Gebze MTB Cup | (Turkey) Izmit | 3 | Emre Yavuz (TUR); Azize Bekar (TUR) | Ufuk Taş (TUR); Sevim Gerçek (TUR) | Okan Aydoğan (TUR); Ekin Ereke (TUR) | |

=== May ===
| Date | Race Name | Location | Class | Winner | Second | Third | Ref |
|---|---|---|---|---|---|---|---|
| 1 May | Paredes de Coura Internacional XCO | (Portugal) Paredes de Coura | 2 | (Portugal) Mário Costa (Portugal) Raquel Queirós | (Portugal) Roberto Ferreira (Portugal) Joana Monteiro | (Spain) Saúl López Álvarez (Estonia) Mari-Liis Mõttus | |
| 3–4 May | Rye bike festival / Rye terrengsykkelfestival XCO-XCC | (Norway) Oslo | 3 | (Norway) Ole Sigurd Rekdahl (XCC) (Norway) Oda Laforce (XCC) (Norway) Martin Farstadvoll (XCO) (Norway) Hedda Brenningen Bjørklund (XCO) | (Norway) Sondre Rokke (XCC) (Norway) Hedda Brenningen Bjørklund (XCC) (Norway) Sondre Rokke (XCO) (Norway) Oda Laforce (XCO) | (Norway) Martin Farstadvoll (XCC) (Denmark) Line Mygdam (XCC) (Norway) Erik Hægstad (XCO) (Denmark) Line Mygdam (XCO) | |
| 4 May | XCO del Montello - Rive degli Angeli | (Italy) Nervesa della Battaglia | 1 | (Italy) Gioele Bertolini (Italy) Martina Berta | (Italy) Filippo Fontana (Italy) Greta Seiwald | (Italy) Daniele Braidot (Italy) Giada Specia | |
| 4 May | Scott Bike Marathon - XCM | (Italy) Riva del Garda | 1 | (Italy) Fabian Rabensteiner (Italy) Sandra Mairhofer | (Switzerland) Marc Stutzmann (Italy) Mara Fumagalli | (Germany) Simon Stiebjahn (Italy) Claudia Peretti | |
| 4 May | Maja Włoszczowska MTB Race | (Poland) Jelenia Góra | 1 | (Poland) Krzysztof Łukasik (Poland) Paula Gorycka | (Poland) Karol Ostaszewski (Poland) Matylda Szczecińska | (Poland) Filip Helta (Poland) Gabriela Wojtyła | |
| 4 May | VII Gigante Small | (Spain) Sant Joan de Moró | 2 | (Spain) Roberto Bou Martín (Spain) Laia Alborch Benavent | (Spain) Alex Sempere Jover (Spain) María Mercedes Villanueva | (Spain) Marçal Mercadal Cereza | |
| 4 May | 1. XCC Wilder Kaiser MTB Race | (Austria) Scheffau am Wilden Kaiser | 3 | (Germany) Tobias König (Germany) Andrea Kravanja | (Germany) Sven Strähle (Austria) Tamara Wiedmann | (Austria) Kilian Feurstein (Austria) Clara Sommer | |
| 4–5 May | ÖKK BIKE REVOLUTION Chur | (Switzerland) Chur | HC | (Switzerland) Lars Forster (France) Pauline Ferrand-Prévot | (Switzerland) Luca Schätti (Switzerland) Alessandra Keller | (Switzerland) Fabio Püntener (Switzerland) Seraina Leugger | |
| 4–5 May | Czech MTB Cup | (Czech Republic) Město Touškov | 1 | (Austria) Mario Bair (Czech Republic) Adéla Holubová | (Germany) Tobias Steinhart (Czech Republic) Jitka Čábelická | (Austria) Gregor Raggl (Czech Republic) Simona Spěšná | |
| 4–5 May | XCO Super Cup | (Portugal) Mortágua | 2 | (Portugal) Mário Costa (Portugal) Ana Santos | (Portugal) Rafael Sousa (Estonia) Mari-Liis Mõttus | (Portugal) Ricardo Marinheiro (Portugal) Joana Monteiro | |
| 5 May | Rye bike festival / Rye terrengsykkelfestival - XCO | (Norway) Oslo | 1 | (Norway) Knut Røhme (Norway) Oda Laforce | (Norway) Erik Hægstad (Norway) Hedda Brenningen Bjørklund | (Norway) Petter Fagerhaug (Denmark) Line Mygdam | |
| 5 May | Shimano Supercup Massi Baza | (Spain) Baza | 1 | (Spain) David Valero (Portugal) Raquel Queirós | (Spain) David Campos (Israel) Na'ama Noyman | (Spain) Juan Luis Pérez Rodríguez (Spain) Núria Bosch Picó | |
| 5 May | Mendoza Race Rally Marathon | (Argentina) Luján de Cuyo | 2 | (Argentina) Juan Goudailliez (Argentina) Lucía Miralles | (Argentina) Bruno Contreras (Uruguay) Ana Laura Fontes | (Argentina) Bruno Ciambella (Argentina) Costanza Pezzotti | |
| 5 May | Wilder Kaiser MTB Race | (Austria) Scheffau am Wilden Kaiser | 2 | (Germany) Sven Strähle (Austria) Tamara Wiedmann | (Germany) Tobias König (Austria) Clara Sommer | (Austria) Lukas Hatz (Austria) Katja Neuner | |
| 5 May | MTB Weekend Eupen | (Belgium) Eupen | 2 | (Belgium) Pierre de Froidmont (Netherlands) Puck Pieterse | (Belgium) Arne Janssens (Belgium) Emeline Detilleux | (Netherlands) Kas van Geest (Netherlands) Lotte Koopmans | |
| 5 May | Abadiño Green Series XCO 2024 | (Spain) Abadiño | 2 | (Spain) Ismael Esteban Agüero (Spain) Estíbaliz Sagardoy | (Spain) Miguel Rámirez de Arellano (Spain) Blanca Vallès Mejías | (Spain) Jaume Bosch Picó (Spain) Sara Cueto Vega | |
| 5 May | Zachodnia Liga MTB - XCM | (Poland) Luboradza | 3 | (Poland) Jakub Żurek (Poland) Barbara Borowiecka | (Poland) Benedykt Długosz (Poland) Adrianna Broda | (Poland) Tomasz Bal (Poland) Ewelina Cywińska | |
| 10 May | Israel Cup 4 Shfaram | (Israel) Shefa-Amr | 2 | (Israel) Nir Tchwella (Israel) Na'ama Noyman | (Israel) Eitan Levi (Israel) Naomi Luria | (Israel) Ron Ben Efraim (Israel) Romi Veldnizki | |
| 10–11 May | BCA Racet 2024 | (Sweden) Borås | 3 | (Sweden) André Eriksson (XCC) (Sweden) Tilda Hylén (XCC) (Sweden) André Eriksson (XCO) (Sweden) Emma Belforth (XCO) | (Sweden) Leo Lounela (XCC) (Sweden) Elin Karlsson (XCC) (Sweden) Edvin Elofsson (XCO) (Sweden) Tilda Hylén (XCO) | (Sweden) Hugo Sandin (XCC) (Sweden) Moa Gustafzzon (XCC) (Sweden) Leo Lounela (XCO) (Sweden) Tove Dandenell (XCO) | |
| 12 May | British Cycling National Cross Country Series Round 2 | (United Kingdom) Margam Country Park | 2 | (United Kingdom) Thomas Mein (United Kingdom) Grace Inglis | (United Kingdom) Jason Bouttell (United Kingdom) Holly MacMahon | (United Kingdom) Simon Wyllie (United Kingdom) Eilish Gilbert | |
| 12 May | Costa degli Etruschi Epic 2024 - XCM | (Italy) Marina di Bibbona | 2 | (Italy) Gioele De Cosmo (Italy) Claudia Peretti | (Norway) Ole Hem (Italy) Maria Zarantonello | (Italy) Stefano Goria | |
| 16 May | Sakarya MTB Cup | (Turkey) Sakarya | 1 | (Belgium) Pierre de Froidmont (Belgium) Emeline Detilleux | (Australia) Sam Fox (Mexico) Monserrath Rodríguez | (Belgium) Jarne Vandersteen (Ukraine) Maria Sherstiuk | |
| 16–19 May | Transgrancanaria Bike - XCMS | (Spain) Las Palmas | S2 | (Netherlands) Hans Becking (Netherlands) Rosa van Doorn | (Spain) Miguel Muñoz Moreno (Netherlands) Tessa Kortekaas | (Spain) Enrique Morcillo (Spain) Natalia Fischer | |
| 17–18 May | Englewood Open | (United States) Fall River | 1 | (United States) Brayden Johnson (XCC) (United States) Greta Kilburn (XCC) (Mexico) Esteban Herrera Ochoa (XCO) (United States) Greta Kilburn (XCO) | (United States) Landen Stovall (XCC) (United States) Lauren Aggeler (XCC) (United States) Carter Hall (XCO) (United States) Kellie Harrington (XCO) | (United States) Brian Matter (XCC) (United States) Bayli McSpadden (XCC) (United States) Caleb Swartz (XCO) (United States) Natasha Visnack (XCO) | |
| 17–19 May | Copa Colombia MTB GW Shimano 3 | (Colombia) Popayán | 2 | (Colombia) Jonathan David Cantor (XCC) (Colombia) Gloria Garzón (XCC) (Colombia) Juan Fernando Monroy (XCO) (Colombia) Gloria Garzón (XCO) | (Colombia) Juan Fernando Monroy (XCC) (Colombia) Zharick Madariaga González (XCC) (Colombia) Jonathan David Cantor (XCO) (Colombia) Camila Cagua (XCO) | (Colombia) Iván Felipe López (XCC) (Colombia) Camila Cagua (XCC) (Colombia) Iván Felipe López (XCO) (Colombia) Angie Milena Lara (XCO) | |
| 18 May | MTB Balkan Championship 2024 | (Serbia) Fruška Gora | JR | (Romania) Roberto Dumitru Burța (Cyprus) Constantina Georgiou | (Romania) Patrick Pescaru (Bosnia and Herzegovina) Karla Kustura | (Greece) Alexandros Athanasiadis (Greece) Eirini Maria Karousou | |
| 18 May | Shimano MTB Liga #2 | (Denmark) Silkeborg | 1 | (Denmark) Sebastian Fini Carstensen (Denmark) Malene Degn | (Denmark) Oliver Vedersø Sølvhøj (Denmark) Julie Lillelund | (Denmark) Tobias Lillelund (Denmark) Emma Lyngholm | |
| 18 May | Courmayeur MTB Event | (Italy) Courmayeur | 1 | (Italy) Gioele Bertolini (Italy) Martina Berta | (France) Maxime Marotte (Italy) Sara Cortinovis | (France) Antoine Philipp (Italy) Giorgia Marchet | |
| 18 May | JBG 2 Pressingowa Petarda MTB XCO Jastrzębie-Zdrój | (Poland) Jastrzębie-Zdrój | 1 | (Poland) Krzysztof Łukasik (Poland) Matylda Szczecińska | (Poland) Karol Ostaszewski (Poland) Gabriela Wojtyła | (Poland) Filip Helta (Poland) Zuzanna Krzystała | |
| 18 May | Sakarya MTB Cup Night Race | (Turkey) Sakarya | 1 | (Belgium) Pierre de Froidmont (Belgium) Emeline Detilleux | (Belgium) Jarne Vandersteen (Mexico) Monserrath Rodríguez | (Australia) Sam Fox (Ukraine) Maria Sherstiuk | |
| 18 May | Csömör Cup | (Hungary) Csömör | 2 | (Hungary) Zsombor Palumby (Hungary) Csenge Anna Bokros | (Ukraine) Oleksandr Hudyma (Hungary) Szonja Greman | (Hungary) Benedek Borsos (Kazakhstan) Alina Sarkulova | |
| 18–19 May | Internacional Chaoyang Estrada Real | (Brazil) Ouro Branco | 1 | (Brazil) Gustavo Xavier de Oliveira Pereira (XCC) (Brazil) Iara Caetano Leite (XCC) (Brazil) Luiz Cocuzzi (XCO) (Brazil) Iara Caetano Leite (XCO) | (Brazil) Luiz Cocuzzi (XCC) (Brazil) Sabrina Oliveira da Silva (XCC) (Brazil) Sherman Trezza de Paiva (XCO) (Brazil) Sabrina Oliveira da Silva (XCO) | (Chile) Patricio Farías Díaz (XCC) (Brazil) Luiza Cocuzzi (XCC) (Brazil) Gustavo Xavier de Oliveira Pereira (XCO) (Brazil) Letícia Cândido (XCO) | |
| 18–19 May | Subterra Grand Prix Zadov - Czech MTB Cup XCO | (Czech Republic) Zadov | 1 | (Canada) Gunnar Holmgren (Canada) Isabella Holmgren | (Czech Republic) Ondřej Cink (Czech Republic) Patricie Srnská | (Czech Republic) Jan Sáska (Canada) Ava Holmgren | |
| 18–19 May | Vulkan-Race Gedern - Internationale MTB Bundesliga | (Germany) Gedern | 1 | (Germany) Maximilian Brandl (Germany) Nina Benz | (Germany) Tobias Steinhart (Germany) Ronja Eibl | (Germany) Alex Bregenzer (Germany) Andrea Kravanja | |
| 18–19 May | XCO Super Cup | (Portugal) Vila do Conde | 2 | (Portugal) Mário Costa (Portugal) Joana Monteiro | (Portugal) Roberto Ferreira (Spain) Lara Lois García | (Portugal) Rafael Sousa (Estonia) Maaris Meier | |
| 18–20 May | IXS Dirt Masters Festival | (Germany) Winterberg | 2 | (New Zealand) Sam Gale (Norway) Kine Haugom | (Germany) Nils Klasen (Belgium) Roos Op de Beeck | (United Kingdom) Josh Lowe (Germany) Lea Kumpf | |
| 19 May | Gothenburg MTB Race | (Sweden) Gothenburg | 1 | (Norway) Emil Hasund Eid (Sweden) Emma Belforth | (Norway) Petter Fagerhaug (Norway) Lisa Kristine Jorde | (Norway) Eskil Evensen-Lie (Norway) Ingrid Bøe Jacobsen | |
| 19 May | 26. XCO Kamnik, UCI C1 | (Slovenia) Kamnik | 1 | (Italy) Luca Braidot (Ukraine) Yana Belomoyna | (Italy) Daniele Braidot (Slovenia) Tanja Žakelj | (Italy) Filippo Fontana (Slovenia) Vita Movrin | |
| 19 May | Jura Bike Marathon | (Switzerland) Vallorbe | 1 | (Switzerland) Alexandre Balmer (Netherlands) Sophie von Berswordt | (Germany) Simon Stiebjahn (Namibia) Vera Looser | (Germany) Jakob Hartmann (France) Juliette Trombini | |
| 19 May | MTB Festival Vlaanderen Genk | (Belgium) Genk | 2 | (Belgium) Clément Horny (Netherlands) Lotte Koopmans | (Netherlands) Morris Gruiters (Netherlands) Romana Carfora | (Belgium) Théo Demarcin (Netherlands) Femke Mossinkoff | |
| 19 May | Hardwood Canada Cup | (Canada) Oro-Medonte | 2 | (Canada) Tyler Orschel (Canada) Jocelyn Stel | (Canada) Owen Clark (Canada) Anabelle Drouin | (Canada) Quinton Disera (Canada) Marie-Fay St-Onge | |
| 19 May | 27 Genoa Cup - Marathon dell'Appennino - XCM | (Italy) Casella | 2 | (Colombia) Héctor Leonardo Páez (Italy) Mara Fumagalli | (Italy) Gioele De Cosmo (Germany) Adelheid Morath | (Italy) Dario Cherchi (Italy) Giulia Alberti | |
| 19 May | Green Series XCO Lezama 2024 | (Spain) Lezama | 2 | (Spain) Kevin Suárez (Spain) Estíbaliz Sagardoy | (Spain) Darío Silvestre (Spain) Lucía González | (Spain) Iñigo Gómez (Spain) Ainara Elbusto | |
| 19–20 May | Ötztaler Mountainbike Festival | (Austria) Haiming | HC | (Germany) Luca Schwarzbauer (Austria) Mona Mitterwallner | (United Kingdom) Charlie Aldridge (Sweden) Jenny Rissveds | (Denmark) Simon Andreassen (Austria) Laura Stigger | |
| 20 May | Shimano MTB Liga #3 | (Denmark) Rold Skov | 1 | (Denmark) Sebastian Fini Carstensen (Denmark) Sofie Heby Pedersen | (Denmark) Oliver Vedersø Sølvhøj (Denmark) Julie Lillelund | (Denmark) Gustav Heby Pedersen (Denmark) Line Mygdam | |
| 23–26 May | Monster Energy Pro Downhill Series - Mountain Creek | (United States) Mountain Creek | 2 | (United States) Asa Vermette (New Zealand) Erice van Leuven | (United States) Dante Silva (Canada) Rachel Pageau | (United States) Cole Suetos (United States) Sara Ligman | |
| 24 May | Crankworx Cairns | (Australia) Cairns | 1 | (Australia) Connor Fearon (Australia) Tracey Hannah | (Australia) Joel Sutherland (Australia) Ellie Smith | (Australia) Jackson Frew (United Kingdom) Martha Gill | |
| 25–26 May | #2 Internacional MTB Series | (Brazil) Caxambu | 2 | (Brazil) José Gabriel Marques (XCC) (Brazil) Danielle Moraes (XCC) (Brazil) José Gabriel Marques (XCO) (Brazil) Danielle Moraes (XCO) | (Brazil) Gabriel Vieira Gaspar (XCC) (Brazil) Larissa Cristina da Silva (XCC) (Chile) Javier Ignacio Díaz Gajardo (XCO) (Brazil) Larissa Cristina da Silva (XCO) | (Brazil) Flávio de Jesus Lobo Neto (XCC) (XCC) (Brazil) Edson Gilmar De Rezende Junior (XCO) (XCO) | |
| 24–26 May | Willingen Bike Festival - DHI | (Germany) Willingen | 2 | (France) Léo Grisel (Germany) Lea Stornebel | (New Zealand) Bryn Dickerson (Belgium) Roos Op de Beeck | (Australia) Jed Stanton (Germany) Lea Kumpf | |
| 25 May | Willingen Bike Festival - XCM | (Germany) Willingen | 2 | (Switzerland) Urs Huber (Germany) Friderike Schnatz | (Netherlands) Teus Ruijter (Germany) Theresia Schwenk | (Germany) Aaron Wilhelmi (Germany) Carolin Zinn | |
| 25 May | Huskvarna MTB Tour | (Sweden) Huskvarna | 2 | (Sweden) Hugo Sandin (Sweden) Emma Belforth | (Sweden) Noel Olsson (Mexico) Monserrath Rodríguez | (Sweden) Måns Eliasson (Sweden) Tove Dandenell | |
| 25–26 May | National Downhill Series - Round 2 | (United Kingdom) Fort William | 1 | (United Kingdom) Joe Breeden (United Kingdom) Jessica Stone | (United Kingdom) George Madley (United Kingdom) Nina-Yves Cameron | (United Kingdom) Luke Mumford (United Kingdom) Bethany McCully | |
| 25–26 May | Coupe de Japon MTB Yawatahama International MTB Race 2024 + Asian Series | (Japan) Yawatahama | 1 | (Japan) Toki Sawada (Japan) Urara Kawaguchi | (Japan) Ryo Takeuchi (Indonesia) Sayu Bella Sukma Dewi | (Japan) Asahi Miyazu (Japan) Yui Ishida | |
| 25–26 May | Copa Aguavista XCO-XCC | (Paraguay) San Juan del Paraná | 1 | (Chile) Ignacio Gallo Florido (XCC) (Argentina) Agustina Quirós (XCC) (Chile) Ignacio Gallo Florido (XCO) (Argentina) Agustina Quirós (XCO) | (Argentina) Juan Goudailliez (XCC) (Germany) Jule Michaelis (XCC) (Argentina) Juan Goudailliez (XCO) (Germany) Jule Michaelis (XCO) | (Colombia) Juan Camilo Echeverri Durango (XCC) (Brazil) Jacksiane Polidorio (XCC) (Paraguay) Esteban Fleitas (XCO) (Paraguay) Nancy Insaurralde Gómez (XCO) | |
| 25–26 May | Portugal Cup DHI | (Portugal) Boticas | 1 | (United Kingdom) Jack Reading (Spain) Mireia Pi Madrenas | (Spain) Yelco Romero (Spain) Zoe Zamora | (Portugal) Vasco Vasconcelos (Portugal) Margarida Bandeira | |
| 26 May | Copa Catalana Internacional BTT Biking Point Barcelona | (Spain) Barcelona | 2 | (Spain) Cristofer Bosque Ruano (Mexico) Monserrath Rodríguez | (Spain) Felipe Orts (Spain) Eva González Mogollón | (Spain) Mario Sinués Micó (Spain) Esther Villaret | |
| 26 May | Argovia Vittoria-Fischer Cup: Seon | (Switzerland) Seon | 3 | (Switzerland) Gian Bütikofer (France) Laura Lavry | (Switzerland) Simon Vitzthum (Austria) Fiona Klien | (Switzerland) Sven Olivetti (Switzerland) Naïka Racheter | |
| 31 May | Desafio Internacional do Cerrado de XCC | (Brazil) Goiânia | 3 | (Brazil) José Gabriel Marques (Brazil) Raiza Goulão | (Brazil) Gustavo Roma de Oliveira Filho (Brazil) Hercília Najara | (Peru) Frank Farfan Palomino (Brazil) Ana Carla Cruciol | |
| 31 May – 2 June | The Showdown @Angler's Ridge | (United States) Danville | 1 | (United States) Devon Feehan (XCC) (United States) Kellie Harrington (XCC) (United States) Devon Feehan (XCO) (United States) Kellie Harrington (XCO) | (United States) Cayden Parker (XCC) (United States) Crystal Peña (XCC) (United States) Carson Beckett (XCO) (United States) Crystal Peña (XCO) | (United States) Owen Deale (XCC) (United States) Hayley Bates (XCC) (United States) Kyan Olshove (XCO) (United States) Melissa Seek (XCO) | |

=== June ===
| Date | Race Name | Location | Class | Winner | Second | Third | Ref |
|---|---|---|---|---|---|---|---|
| 1 June | International MTB Marathon Malevil Cup - XCM | (Czech Republic) Jablonné v Podještědí | 1 | (Czech Republic) Martin Stošek (Germany) Stefanie Dohrn | (Switzerland) Marc Stutzmann (Slovakia) Janka Keseg Števková | (Germany) Simon Stiebjahn (Poland) Aleksandra Andrzejewska | |
| 1 June | Puchar Polski MTB XCO - Muszynianka Poland Cup | (Poland) Krynica Morska | 1 | (Poland) Paweł Bernas (Poland) Gabriela Wojtyła | (Poland) Filip Helta (Poland) Natalia Grzegorzewska | (Poland) Maciej Jeziorski (Poland) Aleksandra Podgórska | |
| 1 June | Reto Hacienda Sabanera | (Puerto Rico) Salinas | 1 | (Mexico) Esteban Herrera Ochoa (Colombia) Ana Maria Roa | (Puerto Rico) Georwill Pérez (Puerto Rico) Suheily Rodríguez | (Puerto Rico) José Fuentes | |
| 1 June | AC Heating Cup AŠ - Velká cena Smrčin | (Czech Republic) Aš | 3 | (Czech Republic) Jan Škarnitzl (Czech Republic) Simona Spěšná | (Czech Republic) Jan Rajchart (Czech Republic) Katerina Uhmanová | (Australia) Jack Ward (Czech Republic) Blanka Vaněčková | |
| 1–2 June | ÖKK BIKE REVOLUTION Engelberg | (Switzerland) Engelberg | HC | (Switzerland) Marcel Guerrini (Switzerland) Alessandra Keller | (Switzerland) Nino Schurter (Switzerland) Seraina Leugger | (Switzerland) Timon Rüegg (Switzerland) Linda Indergand | |
| 1–2 June | Taça Brasil de Cross Country | (Brazil) Goiânia | 1 | (Brazil) José Gabriel Marques (Brazil) Raiza Goulão | (Brazil) Gustavo Roma (Brazil) Hercília Najara | (Brazil) Luiz Henrique Rodrigues (Brazil) Ana Carla Cruciol | |
| 1–2 June | British Cycling National Cross Country Series Round 3 | (United Kingdom) Cannock Chase | 2 | (United Kingdom) Charlie Aldridge (United Kingdom) Harriet Harnden | (United Kingdom) Corran Carrick-Anderson (United Kingdom) Anna Flynn | (United Kingdom) Thomas Mein (United Kingdom) Nicky Healy | |
| 1–2 June | Lugnet XCO | (Sweden) Falun | 2 | (Sweden) Leo Lounela (XCC) (Sweden) Elin Karlsson (XCC) (Sweden) Leo Lounela (XCO) (Sweden) Emma Belforth (XCO) | (Sweden) Edvin Elofsson (XCC) (Sweden) Tilda Hylén (XCC) (Sweden) Oscar Lind (XCO) (Sweden) Ida Ossiansson (XCO) | (Sweden) David Risberg (XCC) (Sweden) Ida Ossiansson (XCC) (Norway) Eskil Evensen-Lie (XCO) (Sweden) Tilda Hylén (XCO) | |
| 1–2 June | Red Bull Hardline | (United Kingdom) Dinas Mawddwy | 3 | (Republic of Ireland) Rónán Dunne | (United Kingdom) Bernard Kerr | (Colombia) Juan Muñoz | |
| 2 June | Roc Laissagais - XCM | (France) Laissac | HC | (Belgium) Wout Alleman (Netherlands) Rosa van Doorn | (Switzerland) Martin Fanger (Spain) Meritxell Figueras | (Germany) Simon Schneller (Netherlands) Tessa Kortekaas | |
| 2 June | Zanzenbergrennen | (Austria) Dornbirn | 1 | (Switzerland) Thomas Litscher (Austria) Laura Stigger | (Austria) Mario Bair (Austria) Tamara Wiedmann | (Austria) Gregor Raggl (Austria) Katrin Embacher | |
| 2 June | Vittoria 3 Nations Cup - TorQ Trophy VAM berg | (Netherlands) Drijber | 1 | (Netherlands) Rens Teunissen van Manen (Netherlands) Lotte Koopmans | (Belgium) Daan Soete (Netherlands) Romana Carfora | (Netherlands) Kas van Geest (Netherlands) Femke Mossinkoff | |
| 2 June | Tremblant Coupe Canada XCO | (Canada) Mont-Tremblant | 2 | (Canada) Tyler Orschel (Canada) Marin Lowe | (Canada) Mika Comaniuk (Canada) Laurie Arseneault | (Canada) Maxime St-Onge (United States) Greta Kilburn | |
| 2 June | Green Series XCO Barakaldo 2024 | (Spain) Barakaldo | 2 | (Spain) Aniol Morell (Spain) Lara Lois | (Spain) Kevin Suárez (Spain) Lucía González | (Spain) Gexan Albisu Etxebeste (Spain) Ainara Elbusto | |
| 2 June | City Mountainbike - XCC | (Belgium) Leuven | 3 | (Romania) Ede Molnár (Italy) Gaia Tormena | (Netherlands) Yaël Plas (Denmark) Line Mygdam | (Estonia) Kirill Tarassov (Estonia) Merili Sirvel | |
| 2 June | Zachodnia Liga MTB ATF Maraton - XCM | (Poland) Połczyn-Zdrój | 3 | (Poland) Benedykt Długosz (Poland) Barbara Borowiecka | (Poland) Paweł Garczyk (Poland) Wiktoria Klawitter | (Poland) Michał Gehrke | |
| 7–9 June | MTB French Cup XCO/XCC | (France) Ussel | HC | (France) Titouan Carod (XCC) (France) Léna Gérault (XCC) (France) Titouan Carod (XCO) (France) Loana Lecomte (XCO) | (France) Maxime Loret (XCC) (France) Constance Valentin (XCC) (France) Antoine Philipp (XCO) (France) Olivia Onesti (XCO) | (France) Antoine Philipp (XCC) (France) Isaure Medde (XCC) (France) Yannis Musy (XCO) (France) Léna Gérault (XCO) | |
| 8 June | Missoula XC | (United States) Missoula | 1 | (United States) Cayden Parker (United States) Chelsea Bolton | (United States) Landen Stovall (United States) Evelyn Dong | (United States) Caleb Swartz (United States) Kaysee Armstrong | |
| 8 June | XCO Samobor | (Croatia) Samobor | 1 | (Italy) Filippo Fontana (Ukraine) Yana Belomoyna | (Australia) Sam Fox (Slovenia) Tanja Žakelj | (Italy) Alessio Agostinelli (Slovenia) Vita Movrin | |
| 8 June | Prima Cup - Skoda Auto Dolní Morava - XCM | (Czech Republic) Dolní Morava | 2 | (Czech Republic) Filip Adel (Czech Republic) Milena Kalašová | (Slovakia) Tomaš Višňovský (Poland) Aleksandra Andrzejewska | (Poland) Karol Rożek (Poland) Michalina Ziółkowska | |
| 8 June | Baie-Saint-Paul Canada Cup XCC | (Canada) Baie-Saint-Paul | 3 | (Canada) Léandre Bouchard (Canada) Laurie Arsenault | (Canada) Simon Ruelland (Canada) Marin Lowe | (Canada) Victor Verreault (Canada) Jocelyn Stel | |
| 8 June | Tekno Point Klima MTB XCO | (Hungary) Alsóörs | 3 | (Hungary) Zsombor Palumby (Hungary) Csenge Anna Bokros | (Hungary) András Parti (Hungary) Lora Oravecz | (Hungary) András Szatmáry | |
| 8–9 June | ASVÖ Raiffeisen Österreich Grand Prix | (Austria) Windhaag bei Perg | 1 | (Austria) Max Foidl (Germany) Leonie Daubermann | (Austria) Mario Bair (Austria) Katharina Sadnik | (Austria) Julius Scherrer (Austria) Clara Sommer | |
| 8–9 June | Czech MTB Cup | (Czech Republic) Bedřichov | 1 | (Czech Republic) Jan Sáska (Czech Republic) Adéla Holubová | (Poland) Filip Helta (Poland) Aleksandra Podgórska | (Czech Republic) Lukáš Kobes (Czech Republic) Simona Spěšná | |
| 8–9 June | Oslo Terrengsykkelfestival | (Norway) Oslo | 1 | (Norway) Sondre Rokke (XCC) (Norway) Ingrid Bøe Jacobsen (XCC) (Norway) Mats Tubaas Glende (XCO) (Norway) Helene Marie Fossesholm (XCO) | (Norway) Erik Hægstad (XCC) (Norway) Lisa Kristine Jorde (XCC) (Norway) Knut Røhme (XCO) (Norway) Lisa Kristine Jorde (XCO) | (Norway) Ole Sigurd Rekdahl (XCC) (Norway) Hedda Brenningen Bjørklund (XCC) (Norway) Erik Hægstad (XCO) (Norway) Ingrid Bøe Jacobsen (XCO) | |
| 8–9 June | XC Kočevje UCI C1 | (Slovenia) Kočevje | 1 | (Italy) Filippo Fontana (Ukraine) Yana Belomoyna | (Australia) Sam Fox (Slovenia) Vita Movrin | (Slovenia) Rok Naglič (Slovenia) Tanja Žakelj | |
| 8–9 June | CIC On Swiss Bike Cup - Leysin | (Switzerland) Leysin | 1 | (Switzerland) Timon Rüegg (New Zealand) Sammie Maxwell | (France) Loan Cheneval (Switzerland) Seraina Leugger | (Switzerland) Ursin Spescha (Switzerland) Rebekka Estermann | |
| 8–9 June | Copa Colombia MTB GW Shimano 3 | (Colombia) Cota | 2 | (Colombia) Juan Fernando Monroy (XCC) (Colombia) Angie Milena Lara (XCC) (Colombia) Iván Felipe López (XCO) (Colombia) Diana Pinilla (XCO) | (Colombia) Iván Felipe López (XCC) (Colombia) Ana María Roa (XCC) (Colombia) Jhonnatan Botero Villegas (XCO) (Colombia) Salomé Cortés (XCO) | (Colombia) Jonathan David Cantor (XCC) (Colombia) Diana Pinilla (XCC) (Colombia) Jonathan David Cantor (XCO) (Colombia) Ana María Roa (XCO) | |
| 8–9 June | Portugal Cup XCO Fundão | (Portugal) Fundão | 2 | (Portugal) Roberto Ferreira (Portugal) Raquel Queirós | (Portugal) Diogo Neves (Portugal) Ana Santos | (Portugal) João Cruz (Portugal) Joana Monteiro | |
| 8–9 June | Borlänge Tour | (Sweden) Borlänge | 2 | (Sweden) Edvin Elofsson (XCC) (Sweden) Linn Gustafsson (XCC) (Sweden) Edvin Elofsson (XCO) (Sweden) Linn Gustafsson (XCO) | (Sweden) Matthias Wengelin (XCC) (Sweden) Ida Ossiansson (XCC) (Sweden) Matthias Wengelin (XCO) (Sweden) Elin Karlsson (XCO) | (Sweden) Viktor Lindqvist (XCC) (Sweden) Moa Gustafsson (XCC) (Sweden) Viktor Lindqvist (XCO) (Sweden) Ida Ossiansson (XCO) | |
| 9 June | Baie-Saint-Paul Canada Cup XCO | (Canada) Baie-Saint-Paul | 1 | (Canada) Léandre Bouchard (Canada) Marin Lowe | (Canada) Tyler Orschel (United States) Greta Kilburn | (Canada) Victor Verreault (Canada) Roxane Vermette | |
| 9 June | Gran Premio Zaragoza XCO | (Spain) Zaragoza | 1 | (Spain) Felipe Orts (Spain) Estíbaliz Sagardoy | (Spain) Juan Luis Pérez Rodríguez (Spain) Núria Bosch Picó | (Spain) Cristofer Bosque Ruano (Spain) Lucía Macho Jiménez | |
| 9 June | British Cycling National Cross Country Series Round 4 | (United Kingdom) Fowey | 2 | (United Kingdom) Cameron Orr (United Kingdom) Evie Richards | (United Kingdom) Max Greensill (United Kingdom) Isla Short | (United Kingdom) Luke Peyton (United Kingdom) Grace Inglis | |
| 9 June | Sivas MTB Cup | (Turkey) Sivas | 2 | (Turkey) Samet Bulut (Turkey) Ekin Ereke | (Turkey) Zeki Kaygısız (Turkey) Sevim Gerçek | (Turkey) Emre Yavuz (Turkey) Semanur Kiriş | |
| 9 June | Coupe du Japon Hakusan-Ichirino | (Japan) Hakusan | 3 | (Japan) Toki Sawada (Indonesia) Sayu Bella Sukma Dewi | (Japan) Ryo Takeuchi (Japan) Maiha Takemura | (Japan) Asahi Miyazu (Japan) Sumie Aoki | |
| 12 June | Canmore Canada Cup XCO | (Canada) Canmore | 1 | (Canada) Logan Sadesky (Canada) Sidney McGill | (Canada) Simon Ruelland (Canada) Ella Myers | (New Zealand) Cameron Jones (Canada) Jocelyn Stel | |
| 13 June | Canmore Canada Cup XCC | (Canada) Canmore | 3 | (New Zealand) Cameron Jones (Canada) Sidney McGill | (Canada) Tyler Clark (Canada) Jocelyn Stel | (Canada) Simon Ruelland (Canada) Ella Myers | |
| 14 June | 4X Pro Tour | (Italy) Val di Sole | 3 | (Czech Republic) Tomáš Slavík (United Kingdom) Morgan Haslam | (Italy) Stefano Dolfin (United States) Abigail Hogie | (Netherlands) Tristan Botteram (Australia) Georgia Henness | |
| 15 June | Hero Südtirol Dolomites - XCM | (Italy) Selva Val Gardena | HC | (Germany) Andreas Seewald (Namibia) Vera Looser | (Czech Republic) Martin Stošek (Italy) Sandra Mairhofer | (Colombia) Héctor Leonardo Páez (Italy) Debora Piana | |
| 15 June | Canmore Canada Cup XCO | (Canada) Canmore | 1 | (Canada) Logan Sadesky (Canada) Jocelyn Stel | (Canada) Maxime St-Onge (Canada) Anabelle Drouin | (United States) Toby Hassett (Canada) Marie-Fay St-Onge | |
| 15 June | SA Enduro Cup | (South Africa) Vaalwater | 3 | (South Africa) Jason Boulle (South Africa) Frances du Toit | (South Africa) Matthew Lombardi (South Africa) Arielle Behr | (South Africa) Luca Zietsman (South Africa) Tashané Ehlers | |
| 15–16 June | Campeonato Centroamericano de MTB | (Costa Rica) San José | 2 | (Honduras) Luis López (XCC) (Costa Rica) Adriana Rojas Cubero (XCC) (Honduras) Luis López (XCO) (Costa Rica) Adriana Rojas Cubero (XCO) | (Costa Rica) Jonathan Quesada (XCC) (Costa Rica) Cristel Espinoza (XCC) (Costa Rica) Jonathan Quesada (XCO) (Costa Rica) Cristel Espinoza (XCO) | (Costa Rica) Raymond González (XCC) (Costa Rica) Marisol García Quirós (XCC) (Costa Rica) Raymond González (XCO) (Costa Rica) Marisol García Quirós (XCO) | |
| 15–16 June | Shimano MTB Liga #4 | (Denmark) Varde | 2 | (Denmark) Mathias Dahl Pedersen (Denmark) Line Mygdam | (Denmark) Frederik Hviid Borning (Denmark) Emma Lyngholm | (Denmark) Kristoffer Eide Andersen (Denmark) Janni Spangsberg | |
| 15–16 June | IXS Downhill Cup | (Germany) Steinach | 2 | (Germany) Nico Lamm (Germany) Lea Stornebel | (Republic of Ireland) Niall Clerkin (Germany) Lea Kumpf | (Germany) Elias Heil (Belgium) Roos Op de Beeck | |
| 15–16 June | Taça Brasil de XCO-RJ | (Brazil) Rio Bonito | 2 | (Chile) Nicolás Delich Pardo (XCC) (Chile) Yarela González (XCC) (Brazil) Cainã Guimarães de Oliveira (XCO) (Chile) Yarela González (XCO) | (Peru) Frank Farfan Palomino (XCC) (XCC) (Chile) Nicolás Delich Pardo (XCO) (Brazil) Rosiana Farias (XCO) | (Brazil) Robson Ferreira (XCC) (XCC) (Peru) Frank Farfan Palomino (XCO) (Brazil) Renata Magalhães (XCO) | |
| 16 June | Shark Attack Bike-Festival | (Germany) Saalhausen Hills | 2 | (Germany) Tobias Steinhart (Netherlands) Romana Carfora | (Germany) Tobias König (Netherlands) Femke Mossinkoff | (Netherlands) Kas van Geest (Netherlands) Annemijn van Limpt | |
| 16 June | Bilbao Bizkaia Green Series XCO 2024 | (Spain) Bilbao | 2 | (France) Hugo Lorentz (France) Amélie Laquebe | (Spain) Eneit Vertiz (Spain) Sara Cueto Vega | (Spain) Ugaitz Arrieta Ugalde (Spain) Cristina Rico Arechaederra | |
| 16 June | Shimano Supercup Massi Naturland | (Andorra) Sant Julià de Lòria | 2 | (United Kingdom) Lewis Askey (Spain) Lucía Macho | (France) Clément Auvin (Spain) Noemí Moreno Casta Eda | (Bolivia) Ever Alejandro Gómez (France) Margaux Borrelly | |
| 16 June | Argovia Vittoria-Fischer Cup: Biasca | (Switzerland) Biasca | 2 | (Namibia) Alex Miller (Switzerland) Lorena Cadalbert | (Switzerland) Gian Andri Schmid (Switzerland) Jana Glaus | (Italy) Stefano Navoni (Austria) Fiona Klien | |
| 20–23 June | Alpentour Trophy - XCMS | (Austria) Schladming | S1 | (Colombia) Héctor Leonardo Páez (Germany) Adelheid Morath | (Czech Republic) Filip Rydval (Czech Republic) Milena Kalašová | (Colombia) Diego Arias (Czech Republic) Karla Löffelmann | |
| 21–23 June | Siol International Mountain Bike Challenge | (Malaysia) Kuching | 2 | (Indonesia) Ihza Muhammad (XCO) (Indonesia) Sayu Bella Sukma Dewi (XCO) (Malaysia) Azizul Azli (XCC) (XCC) (Indonesia) Ihza Muhammad (XCE) (XCE) (Thailand) Methasit Boonsane (DHI) (Thailand) Vipavee Deekaballes (DHI) | (Indonesia) Zaenal Fanani (XCO) (Malaysia) Phi Kun Pan (XCO) (Malaysia) Shahrin Amir (XCC) (XCC) (Singapore) Riyadh Hakim Bin Lukman (XCE) (XCE) (Malaysia) Faris Nashari (DHI) (Thailand) Kanokrat Ritthidet (DHI) | (Indonesia) Feri Yudoyono (XCO) (Malaysia) Nur Assyira Zainal Abidin (XCO) (Malaysia) Mohd Zukri Tahir (XCC) (XCC) (Philippines) John Andre Aguja (XCE) (XCE) (Malaysia) Amer Akbar (DHI) (Malaysia) Eddyna Nasuhar (DHI) | |
| 21 June | Race XCM Arica - XCM | (Chile) Arica | 2 | (Peru) Alonso Gamero (Peru) Odeth Grados Salazar | (Peru) André Alexander Gonzales | (Chile) René Muñoz Pérez | |
| 21 June | #3 CiMTB – Poços de Caldas XCO Classe 1 Elite | (Brazil) Poços de Caldas | 3 | (Brazil) José Gabriel Marques (Brazil) Karen Olímpio | (Brazil) Luiz Cocuzzi (Brazil) Luiza Cocuzzi | (Chile) Nicolás Delich Pardo (Chile) Yarela González | |
| 21–23 June | iXS European Downhill Cup | (Switzerland) Lenzerheide | 1 | (United States) Christopher Grice (Switzerland) Lisa Baumann | (United States) Bode Burke (United States) Abigail Hogie | (New Zealand) Oliver Jenkins Jablonski (Switzerland) Delphine Bulliard | |
| 22 June | Whistler XCO Canada Cup | (Canada) Whistler | 2 | (South Africa) Matthew Scott (Canada) Jocelyn Stel | (Canada) Cam McCallum (Canada) Helena Coney | (United States) Cal Skilsky | |
| 22–23 June | National Downhill Series - Round 3 | (United Kingdom) Antur Stiniog | 2 | (United Kingdom) Adam Brayton (United Kingdom) Stacey Fisher | (Brazil) Roger Vieira (United Kingdom) Jessica Stone | (United Kingdom) Michael Jones (Czech Republic) Monika Mixová | |
| 23 June | #3 CiMTB – Poços de Caldas XCO Classe 1 Elite | (Brazil) Poços de Caldas | 1 | (Brazil) José Gabriel Marques (Brazil) Karen Olímpio | (Brazil) Luiz Cocuzzi (Brazil) Isabella Lacerda | (Brazil) Fernando Nunes de Souza (Chile) Yarela González | |
| 23 June | Górale na Start | (Poland) Wałbrzych | 2 | (Poland) Filip Helta (Poland) Aleksandra Podgórska | (Czech Republic) František Hojka (Poland) Gabriela Wojtyła | (Poland) Mateusz Nieboras (Poland) Antonina Białek | |
| 23 June | Superprestigio MTB | (Spain) Estella-Lizarra | 2 | (Spain) Vicent Zaragoza (Spain) Edurne Izcue Ros | (Spain) Raúl Villar Blanco (Spain) Blanca Vallès Mejías | (Portugal) Ricardo Marinheiro (Spain) Amparo Chapa | |
| 28–29 June | SA XCO Cup Series | (South Africa) Cascades MTB Park | 1 | (South Africa) Michael Foster (XCO) (South Africa) Riley Smith (XCO) (South Africa) Johann van Zyl (XCC) (South Africa) Riley Smith (XCC) | (South Africa) Johann van Zyl (XCO) (Zimbabwe) Stacey Hyslop (XCO) (South Africa) Michael Foster (XCC) (Zimbabwe) Stacey Hyslop (XCC) | (South Africa) Massimiliano Ambrosi (XCO) (South Africa) Lehane Oosthuizen (XCO) (South Africa) Ernest Roets (XCC) (South Africa) Julia Marx (XCC) | |
| 29 June | Grand Prix Prijedor | (Bosnia and Herzegovina) Prijedor | 1 | (Slovenia) Rok Naglič (Slovenia) Maruša Naglič | (Slovenia) Matic Kranjec Žagar (Ukraine) Mariia Sukhopalova | (Czech Republic) Patrik Černý (Bosnia and Herzegovina) Sara Srabović | |
| 29 June | Alpago Bike Funtastic - Internazionali d'Italia Series | (Italy) Lamosano | 1 | Anton Sintsov (Slovenia) Tanja Žakelj | (Italy) Nadir Colledani (Italy) Nicole Pesse | (Italy) Gioele Bertolini (Italy) Lucrezia Braida | |
| 29–30 June | ÖKK BIKE REVOLUTION Davos | (Switzerland) Davos | HC | (Switzerland) Mathias Flückiger (Switzerland) Alessandra Keller | (Switzerland) Lars Forster (Switzerland) Seraina Leugger | (Switzerland) Luca Schätti (Switzerland) Ramona Forchini | |
| 29–30 June | MTB French Cup DHI | (France) Bourg-Saint-Maurice | 1 | (France) Nathan Pontvianne (France) Mélanie Chappaz | (France) Mylann Falquet (Belgium) Siel van der Velden | (France) Léo Grisel (France) Vicky Clavel | |
| 29–30 June | Copa Colombia MTB GW Shimano 4 | (Colombia) Manizales | 2 | (Colombia) Jhonnatan Botero Villegas (XCO) (Colombia) Diana Pinilla (XCO) (Colombia) Jonathan David Cantor (XCC) (Colombia) Ana Sofía Villegas Noreña (XCC) | (Colombia) Jonathan David Cantor (XCO) (Colombia) Ana María Roa (XCO) (Colombia) Iván Felipe López Castañeda (XCC) (Colombia) Camila Cagua González (XCC) | (Colombia) Iván Felipe López Castañeda (XCO) (Colombia) Ana Sofía Villegas Noreña (XCO) (Colombia) Jhonnatan Botero Villegas (XCC) (Colombia) Diana Pinilla (XCC) | |
| 30 June | Grand Prix Bihać | (Bosnia and Herzegovina) Bihać | 1 | (Slovenia) Rok Naglič (Ukraine) Mariia Sukhopalova | (Czech Republic) František Hojka (Slovenia) Maruša Naglič | (Germany) Peat Weinberg (Croatia) Dora Čičin-Šain | |
| 30 June | 3 Nations Cup - Vayamundo MTB Cup | (Belgium) Houffalize | 2 | (Belgium) Antoine Jamin (Netherlands) Lotte Koopmans | (Belgium) Clément Horny (Netherlands) Romana Carfora | (Belgium) Jarne Vandersteen (France) Anaëlle Henry | |
| 30 June | British Cycling National Cross Country Series Round 5 | (United Kingdom) Tong | 2 | (United Kingdom) Joseph Blackmore (United Kingdom) Anna Flynn | (United Kingdom) Cameron Orr (Republic of Ireland) Caoimhe May | (United Kingdom) Max Greensill (United Kingdom) Eilish Gilbert | |
| 30 June | Dirt Heroes International Downhill | (Philippines) Negros Oriental | 2 | (Philippines) Mileochim Catalbas (Philippines) Lea Denise Belgira | (Philippines) Eleazar Barba Jr. (Philippines) Samantha Rem Yuson | (Philippines) Simon Peter Servillon | |
| 30 June | SP XCO C2 PoráčPark | (Slovakia) Poráč | 2 | (Slovakia) Matej Ulík (Hungary) Csenge Anna Bokros | (Czech Republic) Tomáš Ševců (Slovakia) Tereza Kurnická | (Czech Republic) Tomáš Morávek (Slovakia) Linda Paulechová | |
| 30 June | V - Ortuella Green Series XCO - Las Balsas XC | (Spain) Ortuella | 2 | (Spain) Ismael Esteban Agüero (France) Amélie Laquebe | (France) Lucas Grieco (Spain) Edurne Izcue Ros | (Spain) José Miguel Ramírez de Arellano (Spain) Sara Cueto Vega | |
| 30 June | Gran Premio Ciudad del Ciclismo BTT XCO | (Spain) Cervera del Maestre | 2 | (Spain) Felipe Orts (Spain) Estíbaliz Sagardoy | (Spain) Cristofer Bosque Ruano (Spain) Núria Bosch Picó | (Spain) Juan Luis Pérez Rodríguez (Spain) Eva González Mogollón | |

=== July ===
| Date | Race Name | Location | Class | Winner | Second | Third | Ref |
|---|---|---|---|---|---|---|---|
| 3–6 July | Andorra Epic - Pyrenees | (Andorra) La Massana | S2 | (Netherlands) Hans Becking (Belgium) Wout Alleman (Colombia) Mónica Calderon (Netherlands) Tessa Kortekaas | (Spain) Sergio Mantecón Gutiérrez (Spain) José María Sánchez Ruiz (Spain) Meritxell Figueras (Italy) Claudia Peretti | (Germany) Georg Egger (Germany) Lukas Baum (Spain) Almudena Rodríguez López de Armentía (Spain) Sara Caballero | |
| 3–6 July | Kupkolo MTBTrilogy - XCMS | (Czech Republic) Teplice nad Metují | S2 | (Czech Republic) Marek Rauchfuss (Czech Republic) Karla Löffelmann | (Czech Republic) Filip Adel (Poland) Michalina Ziółkowska | (Czech Republic) Marek Bartůněk (Czech Republic) Lenka Štolbová Fridrichová | |
| 5 July | Picos Pro Race Mundo - XCC | (Brazil) Picos | 3 | (Brazil) Kennedi Sampaio (Brazil) Genielle Moura | (Brazil) Francisco Matheus Martins da Silva (Brazil) Eleonete Gadelha Vieira | (Brazil) Renato Rezende (Brazil) Deusilane de Carvalho Silva | |
| 5–7 July | iXS Downhill Cup | (Czech Republic) Velký Špičák | 2 | (Germany) Jannik Abbou (Czech Republic) Sabina Košárková | (Germany) Elias Heil (Austria) Emma Bindhammer | (Germany) Nils Klasen (Germany) Lea Stornebel | |
| 6–7 July | Desafio dos Gigantes XCO & XCC | (Brazil) Ouro Preto | 1 | | | | |
| 6–7 July | Fernie Canada Cup DH | (Canada) Fernie | 2 | (Australia) Jackson Frew (Canada) Vaea Verbeeck | (Canada) Johnathan Helly (Canada) Bailey Goldstone | (Canada) Max Halchuk (Canada) Natasha Miller | |
| 6–7 July | Banyuwangi Ijen Geopark Downhill | (India) Banyuwangi | 1 | (Indonesia) Andy Prayoga (Indonesia) Milatul Khaqimah | (Indonesia) Pahraz Salman Al Parisi (India) Nilna Murni Ningtias | (Indonesia) Agung Priyo Apriliano (Indonesia) Ayu Triya Andriana | |
| 7 July | Hangony XCO | (Hungary) Hangony | 3 | (Hungary) András Szatmáry (Hungary) Virág Buzsáki | (Hungary) Márton Blazsó (Slovakia) Martina Krahulcová | (Slovakia) Juraj Vrbik (Hungary) Lora Oravecz | |
| 7 July | Copa Catalana Internacional BTT Biking Point Vall de Boí | (Spain) La Vall de Boí | 2 | (Bolivia) Ever Alejandro Gómez (Spain) Núria Bosch Picó | (Spain) Alex Alaman Mier (Spain) Noemi Moreno Castañeda | (Spain) Xavier Ariza (Spain) Esther Villaret | |
| 8–13 July | Brasil Ride Espinhaço - XCMS | (Brazil) Conceição do Mato Dentro | S1 | (Portugal) Tiago Ferreira (Brazil) Isabella Lacerda | (Brazil) Edson Rezende (Brazil) Luiza Euzebio de Souza | (Brazil) Sherman Trezza (Brazil) Gabriela Pereira Ferolla | |
| 9–10 July | Panorama Canada Cup DHI | (Canada) Panorama Mountain Resort | 2 | (Canada) Johnathan Helly (Canada) Bailey Goldstone | (Australia) Jackson Frew (Canada) Sophi Lawrence | (Canada) Patrick Laffey (Spain) Ainhoa Ijurco | |
| 12 July | Dieppe Canada Cup XCC | (Canada) Dieppe | 3 | (Canada) Logan Sadesky (Canada) Ava Holmgren | (Canada) Carter Woods (Canada) Jocelyn Stel | (Canada) Ian Ackert (Canada) Marin Lowe | |
| 12–13 July | 4X Pro Tour - JBC 4X Revelations 2024 | (Czech Republic) Jablonec nad Nisou | 3 | (Czech Republic) Tomáš Slavík (United States) Abigail Hogie | (Czech Republic) Pavel Reinl (Czech Republic) Karla Bobková | (Poland) Gustaw Dadela (United Kingdom) Katherine Oldfield | |
| 12–14 July | MTB French Cup XCO & XCC | (France) Puy-Saint-Vincent | HC | (France) Jordan Sarrou (XCO) (France) Olivia Onesti (XCO) (France) Jordan Sarrou (XCC) (France) Olivia Onesti (XCC) | (France) Antoine Philipp (XCO) (France) Noémie Medina (XCO) (France) Antoine Philipp (XCC) (France) Flavie Guille (XCC) | (Norway) Mats Tubaas Glende (XCO) (France) Flavie Guille (XCO) (France) Loan Cheneval (XCC) (Italy) Lucia Bramati | |
| 12–14 July | #3 Internacional MTB Series | (Brazil) Machado | 1 | (Brazil) José Gabriel Marques (XCO) (Brazil) Karen Olímpio (XCO) (Brazil) José Gabriel Marques (XCC) (Brazil) Karen Olímpio (XCC) | (Brazil) Gustavo Xavier de Oliveira Pereira (XCO) (Brazil) Sabrina Oliveira (XCO) (Brazil) Luiz Cocuzzi (XCC) (Brazil) Sabrina Oliveira (XCC) | (Brazil) Cainã Guimarães (XCO) (Chile) María Castro González (XCO) (Brazil) Nicolas Raphael Amancio Romão Machado (XCC) (Brazil) Luiza Cocuzzi | |
| 13 July | 29. Südtirol Dolomiti Superbike - XCM | (Italy) Niederdorf | HC | (Italy) Samuele Porro (Italy) Sandra Mairhofer | (Italy) Fabian Rabensteiner (Italy) Mara Fumagalli | (Italy) Gioele De Cosmo (Italy) Agnes Tschurtschenthaler | |
| 13–14 July | Kicking Horse Canada Cup DH | (Canada) Golden | 2 | (Canada) Patrick Laffey (Canada) Bailey Goldstone | (Canada) Johnathan Helly (Spain) Ainhoa Ijurco | (Canada) Brock Hawes (Canada) Sophi Lawrence | |
| 14 July | XCM Herzegovina - XCM | (Bosnia and Herzegovina) Blidinje plateau | 1 | (Czech Republic) Lubomír Petruš (Slovakia) Martina Krahulcová | (Czech Republic) Karel Hník (Romania) Manuela Mureșan | (Czech Republic) Jakub Zemene (Czech Republic) Zuzana Šafářová | |
| 14 July | Vamos International XCO Challenge | (Philippines) San Carlos | 2 | (Philippines) Emmanuel Dave Montemayor (Philippines) Shagne Paula Yaoyao | (Philippines) Quinn Alegria Moñasque (Philippines) Adel Pia Sendrijas | (Philippines) James Carl Dela Cruz (Philippines) Dianna Marie Costes | |
| 14 July | Black Forest Ultra Bike Marathon - XCM | (Germany) Kirchzarten | 1 | (Switzerland) Casey South (Switzerland) Irina Lützelschwab | (Germany) Sascha Weber (Namibia) Vera Looser | (Estonia) Peeter Pruus (Germany) Stefanie Walter Dorhn | |
| 14 July | Hellenic XCO Mountain Bike #3 | (Greece) Argithea | 2 | (Greece) Charoun Molla (Greece) Aikaterini Eleftheriadou | (Greece) Alexandros Karousos (Greece) Eirini Maria Karousou | (Greece) Nikolaos Georgiadis (Greece) Lydia Moutsiou | |
| 14 July | Grazer Bike-Festival Stattegg | (Austria) Stattegg | 1 | (Austria) Lukas Hatz (Austria) Mona Mitterwallner | (Slovenia) Rok Naglič (Austria) Tamara Wiedmann | (Austria) Julius Scherrer (Austria) Katharina Sadnik | |
| 14 July | Dieppe Canada Cup XCO | (Canada) Dieppe | 1 | (Canada) Ian Ackert (Canada) Ava Holmgren | (Canada) Tyler Orschel (Canada) Marin Lowe | (Canada) Logan Sadesky (Canada) Roxane Vermette | |
| 14–20 July | Bike Transalp | (Austria) Ehrwald/ (Italy) Arco | S1 | (Switzerland) Marc Stutzmann (Czech Republic) Martin Stošek (Germany) Nina Gunther (Germany) Daniela Höfler | (Germany) Simon Stiebjahn (Germany) Jakob Hartmann (Germany) Naima Diesner (Estonia) Greete Steinburg | (Austria) Manuel Pliem (Belgium) Frans Claes (Italy) Lorenza Menapace (France) Danièle Troesch | |
| 15–19 July | Transmaurienne Vanoise | (France) Val-Cenis | S1 | (Switzerland) Micha Klötzli (France) Margot Moschetti | (Cyprus) Andreas Miltiadis (Italy) Costanza Fasolis | (France) Pierre Billaud (France) Sophie Giovane | |
| 18–21 July | Colina Triste - XCMS | (Spain) Santo Domingo de Silos | S1 | (Spain) Luis Francisco Pérez (Spain) Roberto Bou Martín (Netherlands) Rosa van Doorn (Switzerland) Janina Wüst | (Spain) Miguel Muñoz Moreno (Chile) Sebastian Gesche (Spain) Sofia Rodríguez (Estonia) Greete Steinburg | (Spain) Juan Luis Pérez Rodríguez (Spain) Marcos García (Spain) Lucía González Blanco (Spain) Pilar Fernández | |
| 20–21 July | IXS European Downhill Cup Panticosa | (Spain) Panticosa | 1 | (Spain) Pau Menoyo Busquets (Australia) Sacha Mills | (Switzerland) Yannick Baechler (Spain) Mireia Pi Madrenas | (Spain) Ignasi Jorba (Switzerland) Delphine Bulliard | |
| 21 July | Crankworx Canadian Open DH | (Canada) Whistler | 1 | (Canada) Jakob Jewett (New Zealand) Jenna Hastings | (United States) Dakotah Norton (Canada) Emmy Lan | (United States) Luca Shaw (United States) Matilda Melton | |
| 27 July | M3 Montafon Mountainbike - XCM | (Austria) Schruns | 1 | (Austria) Daniel Geismayr (Austria) Sabine Sommer | (Austria) Michael Holland (Czech Republic) Milena Kalašová | (Germany) Matthias Alberti (Austria) Clara Sommer | |
| 27–28 July | Pamporovo Bike Fest | (Bulgaria) Pamporovo | 1 | (Italy) Jan Laner (Bulgaria) Denitsa Tosheva | (Italy) Hannes Alber | (Bulgaria) Dimitar Mazneykov | |
| 27–28 July | iXS DH Cup | (France) Les Deux Alpes | 1 | (France) Antoine Vidal (France) Mélanie Chappaz | (France) Dylan Levesque (France) Lisa Bouladou | (South Africa) Ross Kew (Australia) Sacha Mills | |

=== August ===
| Date | Race Name | Location | Class | Winner | Second | Third | Ref |
|---|---|---|---|---|---|---|---|
| 2–3 August | 4X Pro Tour Bike Festival 2024 | (Czech Republic) Dobřany | 3 | (Czech Republic) Tomáš Slavík (United Kingdom) Katherine Oldfield | (Austria) Hannes Slavik | (United Kingdom) Scott Beaumont | |
| 3–4 August | Silver Star Canada Cup DH | (Canada) Silver Star Mountain Resort | 1 | (Canada) Johnathan Helly (Canada) Sophi Lawrence | (Canada) Patrick Laffey (Spain) Ainhoa Ijurko | (Canada) Hugo Langevin (Canada) Bailey Goldstone | |
| 3–4 August | Caribbean Mountain Bike Cycling Championships | (Dominican Republic) Santiago de los Caballeros | 2 | (Puerto Rico) Georwill Pérez Román (XCC) (Puerto Rico) Suheily Rodríguez (XCC) (Puerto Rico) Georwill Pérez Román (XCO) (Puerto Rico) Suheily Rodríguez (XCO) | (Bermuda) Robin Horsfield (XCC) (Dominican Republic) Gabriella Tejada (XCC) (Dominican Republic) Jeudy Liranzo (XCO) (Dominican Republic) Gabriella Tejada (XCO) | (Dominican Republic) Joel García Peña (XCC) (Dominican Republic) Flor Espiritusanto (XCC) (Dominican Republic) Joel García Peña (XCO) (Dominican Republic) Mary Elba García Pichardo | |
| 10 August | Górale na Start | (Poland) Boguszów-Gorce | 2 | (Poland) Filip Helta (Poland) Matylda Szczecińska | (Denmark) Kristian Andersen (Poland) Klaudia Czabok | (Poland) Brajan Świder (Poland) Antonina Białek | |
| 10–11 August | Czech MTB Cup | (Czech Republic) Ostrava | 1 | (Czech Republic) Jan Sáska (Hungary) Virág Buzsáki | (Czech Republic) Jan Zatloukal (Czech Republic) Simona Spěšná | (Poland) Krzysztof Łukasik (Poland) Aleksandra Podgórska | |
| 11 August | Argovia Vittoria-Fischer Cup | (Switzerland) Langendorf | 2 | (Switzerland) Vital Albin (Australia) Zoe Cuthbert | (Switzerland) Fabio Püntener (Switzerland) Steffi Häberlin | (Switzerland) Luca Schatti (Switzerland) Lea Huber | |
| 11 August | MTB Eliminator Geleen | (Netherlands) Geleen | 3 | (Netherlands) Ruben Nederveen (XCC) (Denmark) Line Mygdam (XCC) (Netherlands) Ruben Nederveen (XCE) (Netherlands) Didi de Vries (XCE) | (Germany) Julian Huber (XCC) (France) Coline Clauzure (XCC) (Japan) Kota Furue (XCE) (Netherlands) Annemoon van Dienst (XCE) | (Germany) Felix Klausmann (XCC) (France) Margaux Borrelly (XCC) (Germany) Felix Klausmann (XCE) (Denmark) Line Mygdam | |
| 11 August | 76 Indonesian Downhill #1 | (Indonesia) Yogyakarta | 2 | (Indonesia) Andy Prayoga (Indonesia) Ayu Triya Andriana | (Indonesia) Putra Arozak (Indonesia) Karisha Alvinita R | (Indonesia) Mohammad Abdul Hakim (Indonesia) Regina Panie | |
| 16 August | Grand Prix Banja Luka - XCC | (Bosnia and Herzegovina) Banja Luka | 3 | (Germany) Benjamin Krüger (Italy) Lucrezia Braida | (Italy) Emanuele Huez (Austria) Katharina Sadnik | (Germany) Lars Gräter (Austria) Valentina Gruber | |
| 16–18 August | IXS Downhill Cup | (Germany) Ilmenau | 2 | (Germany) Henri Kiefer (Germany) Raphaela Richter | (Germany) Hannes Lehmann (Germany) Helen Weber | (Germany) Julian Steiner (Germany) Hanna Blochberger | |
| 17–18 August | Monster Energy Pro Downhill Series - Snow Summit | (United States) Snow Summit | 3 | (United States) Austin Dooley (New Zealand) Erice van Leuven | (United States) Kenneth Pinkerton (United States) Isabella Naughton | (United States) Nathan Kitchen (United States) Pella Ward | |
| 17–18 August | MTB French Cup - XCO & DHI | (France) Les Menuires | 1 | (France) Kimi Viardot (DHI) (France) Elise Porta (DHI) (South Africa) Alan Hatherly (XCO) (New Zealand) Sammie Maxwell (XCO) | (France) Baptiste Pierron (DHI) (Australia) Sacha Mills (DHI) (France) Luca Martin (XCO) (France) Olivia Onesti (XCO) | (France) Alexandre Fayolle (DHI) (France) Mélanie Chappaz (DHI) (France) Mathis Azzaro (XCO) (Italy) Chiara Teocchi (XCO) | |
| 18 August | Argovia Vittoria-Fischer Cup | (Switzerland) Hägglingen | 3 | (Switzerland) Nick Burki (Switzerland) Jolanda Neff | (Switzerland) Sven Olivetti (Switzerland) Seraina Leugger | (Germany) Fabian Eder (Switzerland) Chrystelle Baumann | |
| 18 August | Grand Prix Banja Luka - XCO | (Bosnia and Herzegovina) Banja Luka | 1 | (Germany) Benjamin Krüger (Austria) Katharina Sadnik | (Slovakia) Matej Ulík (Italy) Lucrezia Braida | (Germany) Lars Gräter (Austria) Valentina Gruber | |
| 18 August | Hakkari MTB Cup | (Turkey) Hakkâri | 2 | (Turkey) Ufuk Taș (Turkey) Ekin Ereke | (Turkey) Ayberk Güngör (Turkey) Melike Yiğit | (Turkey) Burak Başer (Turkey) Selcan Bahar Karabal | |
| 18 August | City Mountainbike - XCC | (Brazil) São Paulo | 3 | (Brazil) Mário Couto Grego Santos (Brazil) Ana Laura Oliveira Moraes | (Brazil) Rubens Donizete (Brazil) Iara Caetano Leite | (Romania) Ede-Károly Molnár (Brazil) Luiza Cocuzzi | |
| 20–24 August | SPAR Swiss Epic - XCMS | (Switzerland) Davos | S1 | (Switzerland) Gian Andri Schmid (Switzerland) Lukas Flückiger (Colombia) Mónica Calderon (Netherlands) Tessa Kortekaas | (Italy) Lorenzo Samparisi (Italy) Nicolas Samparisi (Namibia) Vera Looser (South Africa) Danielle Strydom | (Switzerland) Ursin Spescha (Switzerland) Simon Walter (Italy) Costanza Fasolis (Italy) Chiara Burato | |
| 24 August | AC Heating Cup Ústí Nad Labem | (Czech Republic) Ústí nad Labem | 3 | (Czech Republic) Jan Rajchart (Czech Republic) Aneta Novotná | (Czech Republic) Václav Naxera (Czech Republic) Kateřina Uhmanová | (Czech Republic) Patrik Černý (Ukraine) Mariia Orekhova | |
| 24 August | St. Félicien Canada Cup XCC | (Canada) Saint-Félicien | 1 | (Canada) Carter Woods (Canada) Laurie Arsenault | (Canada) Logan Sadesky (Canada) Jocelyn Stel | (Canada) Soren Weselake (Canada) Juliette Tétreault | |
| 24 August | Grand Raid BCVS - MTB Alpine Cup - XCM | (Switzerland) Grimentz | HC | (Germany) Andreas Seewald (Switzerland) Irina Lützelschwab | (Switzerland) Alexandre Balmer (Switzerland) Alessia Nay | (Spain) Roberto Bou Martín (Switzerland) Janina Wüst | |
| 24–25 August | Swiss Bike Cup Basel | (Switzerland) Basel | HC | (Switzerland) Vital Albin (Switzerland) Steffi Häberlin | (Switzerland) Filippo Colombo (Italy) Giada Specia | (Switzerland) Fabio Püntener (Germany) Leonie Daubermann | |
| 24–25 August | Copa Paraguay K6 Naranjal Mountain Bike | (Paraguay) Naranjal District | 2 | (Paraguay) Lucas Bogado Hermann (XCC) (Paraguay) Carine Dreher Ciriaco (XCC) (Paraguay) Walter Adhemar Oberladstatter (XCO) (Paraguay) Carine Dreher Ciriaco (XCO) | (Paraguay) Walter Adhemar Oberladstatter (XCC) (Paraguay) Sindy Dahiana Servín Gauto (XCC) (Paraguay) Abel Cristaldo (XCO) (Brazil) Marciele Musskopf (XCO) | (Brazil) Elvis Felisberto de Miranda (XCC) (Brazil) Marciele Musskopf (XCC) (Paraguay) Lucas Bogado Hermann (XCO) (Germany) Jule Michaelis (XCO) | |
| 24–25 August | Dalatråkken MTB 2024 | (Norway) Brumunddal | 1 | (Norway) Ole Sigurd Rekdahl (XCC) (Norway) Lisa Kristine Jorde (XCC) (Norway) Petter Fagerhaug (XCO) (Norway) Lisa Kristine Jorde (XCO) | (Norway) Erik Hægstad (XCC) (Norway) Sigrid Andrea Fløgstad (XCC) (Norway) William Handley (XCO) (Norway) Berit Nordsæter Resell (XCO) | (Norway) Petter Fagerhaug (XCC) (Norway) Hedda Steine Gulholm (XCC) (Norway) Emil Hasund Eid (XCO) (Norway) Hedda Steine Gulholm (XCO) | |
| 24–25 August | Stevie Smith Memorial Canada Cup DH | (Canada) Mount Washington | 2 | (Canada) Patrick Laffey (Spain) Ainhoa Ijurco | (Canada) Henry Sherry (Canada) Kayley Sherlock | (Canada) Seth Sherlock (Canada) Mhairi Smart | |
| 24–25 August | Shimano MTB Liga #5 | (Denmark) Sorø | 2 | (Denmark) Sebastian Fini Carstensen (Denmark) Line Mygdam | (Denmark) Gustav Heby Pedersen (Denmark) Emma Lyngholm | (France) Raphaël Pottier (Denmark) Janni Spangsberg | |
| 25 August | Kayseri MTB Cup | (Turkey) Kayseri | 1 | (Turkey) Emre Yavuz (Turkey) Ekin Ereke | (Turkey) Furkan Akçam (Turkey) Melike Yiğit | (Turkey) Ufuk Taș | |
| 25 August | Ibero-Americano MTB-XCM | (Costa Rica) Juan Viñas District | 2 | (Spain) Sergio Mantecón Gutiérrez (Spain) Natalia Fischer Egusquiza | (Brazil) Luiz Miguel Honório (Costa Rica) Cristel Espinoza | (Colombia) Luis Anderson Mejía (Costa Rica) Krissia Araya | |
| 25 August | St. Félicien Canada Cup XCO | (Canada) Saint-Félicien | 1 | (Canada) Carter Woods (Canada) Laurie Arsenault | (Canada) Logan Sadesky (Canada) Juliette Tétreault | (Canada) Raphaël Auclair (Canada) Léa Bouchard | |
| 25 August | Serbia EPIC ŠKODA Stara Planina - XCM | (Serbia) Balkan Mountains | 1 | (Germany) Martin Frey (North Macedonia) Dunja Ivanova | (Serbia) Milan Nešić (Serbia) Bojana Jovanović | (Serbia) Aleksa Rajković (Bulgaria) Asia Borisova | |
| 27–31 August | 10° Rally di Sardegna 2024 | (Italy) Aritzo | S2 | (Italy) Davide Foccoli (Netherlands) Tessa Kortekaas | (Greece) Periklis Ilias (Italy) Claudia Peretti | (Italy) Riccardo Chiarini (Colombia) Mónica Calderon | |

=== September ===
| Date | Race Name | Location | Class | Winner | Second | Third | Ref |
|---|---|---|---|---|---|---|---|
| 6–8 September | #4 Internacional MTB Series | (Brazil) Pará de Minas | 2 | (Brazil) José Gabriel Marques (XCC) (Brazil) Karen Olímpio (XCC) (Brazil) José Gabriel Marques (XCO) (Brazil) Karen Olímpio (XCO) | (Brazil) Ulan Bastos Galinski (XCC) (Brazil) Sabrina Oliveira (XCC) (Brazil) Ulan Bastos Galinski (XCO) (Brazil) Raiza Goulão (XCO) | (Brazil) Nicolas Rafhael Amancio (XCC) (Brazil) Danielle Moraes (XCC) (Brazil) Mario Couto Grego Santos (XCO) (Brazil) Sabrina Oliveira (XCO) | |
| 7 September | CykloOpawy MTB XCO Głuchołazy | (Poland) Głuchołazy | 3 | (Poland) Krzysztof Łukasik (Poland) Aleksandra Podgórska | (Poland) Filip Helta (Poland) Gabriela Wojtyła | (Poland) Karol Ostaszewski (Poland) Matylda Szczecińska | |
| 7 September | Mythos Primiero Dolomiti - XCM | (Italy) Primiero San Martino di Castrozza | 2 | (Italy) Samuele Porro (Italy) Claudia Peretti | (Italy) Nicola Taffarel (Italy) Debora Piana | (Italy) Nicolas Samparisi (Italy) Giada Specia | |
| 7 September | Val D'arda Bike | (Italy) Lugagnano Val d'Arda | 2 | (Italy) Andreas Emanuele Vittone (Italy) Nicole Pesse | (Austria) Mario Bair (Switzerland) Tina Züger | (Italy) Nadir Colledani (Italy) Lucrezia Braida | |
| 7–8 September | Sande MTB Weekend | (Norway) Sande | 1 | (Norway) Ole Sigurd Rekdahl (XCC) (Norway) Oda Laforce (XCC) (Norway) Knut Røhme (XCO) (Norway) Lisa Kristine Jorde (XCO) | (Norway) Erik Hægstad (XCC) (Sweden) Linn Gustafsson (XCC) (Norway) Mats Tubaas Glende (XCO) (Norway) Oda Laforce (XCO) | (Norway) Sivert Ekroll (XCC) (Norway) Thea Siggerud (XCC) (Norway) Sivert Ekroll (XCO) (Norway) Thea Siggerud (XCO) | |
| 7–8 September | Shimano MTB Liga #6 | (Denmark) Slangerup | 2 | (Denmark) Oliver Vedersø Sølvhøj (Denmark) Sofie Heby Pedersen | (Denmark) Mikkel Lose (Denmark) Julie Lillelund | (Denmark) Hector Hjorth (Denmark) Emma Lyngholm | |
| 8 September | Majlen Sunshine Race N°2 | (Germany) Winterberg | 2 | (Belgium) Jens Schuermans (Germany) Nina Benz | (Belgium) Arne Janssens (Netherlands) Lotte Koopmans | (Germany) Lennart Krayer (Germany) Kaya Pfau | |
| 13–15 September | iXS European Downhill Cup | (Switzerland) Verbier | 1 | (Norway) Simen Smestad (Australia) Elise Empey | (France) Gaëtan Vigé (Belgium) Siel van der Velden | (United Kingdom) Dom Platt (Norway) Kine Haugom | |
| 14–15 September | Borovets Open Cup | (Bulgaria) Borovets | 1 | (Greece) Alexandros Topkaroglou (Bulgaria) Denitsa Tosheva | (Bulgaria) Kristiyan Dimitrov | (France) Thomas Guibal | |
| 14–15 September | Hallbyrundan | (Sweden) Jönköping | 1 | (Sweden) Edvin Elofsson (XCC) (Sweden) Linn Gustafsson (XCC) (Sweden) Leo Lounela (XCO) (Sweden) Linn Gustafsson (XCO) | (Sweden) Viktor Lindqvist (XCC) (Sweden) Elin Karlsson (XCC) (Sweden) Edvin Elofsson (XCO) (Sweden) Elin Karlsson (XCO) | (Sweden) André Eriksson (XCC) (Sweden) Moa Gustafsson (XCO) (Sweden) André Eriksson (XCO) (Sweden) Tove Dandenell (XCO) | |
| 15 September | ÖKK Bike Revolution #5 | (Switzerland) Huttwil | HC | (Switzerland) Mathias Flückiger (Switzerland) Alessandra Keller | (Switzerland) Marcel Guerrini (Switzerland) Sina Frei | (France) Jordan Sarrou (Switzerland) Nicole Koller | |
| 15 September | La Forestiere - XCM | (France) Arbent | HC | (Germany) Simon Schneller (Switzerland) Alessia Nay | (Germany) Martin Frey (France) Margot Moschetti | (France) Axel Roudil (Switzerland) Mallory Barth | |
| 15 September | MTB French Cup - DHI | (France) Les Orres | 1 | (France) Antoine Pierron (France) Mélanie Chappaz | (France) Nathan Pontvianne (France) Vicky Clavel | (France) Antoine Vidal (France) Lisa Bouladou | |
| 15 September | Rouvy Velká Cena Vimperka | (Czech Republic) Vimperk | 2 | (Czech Republic) Ondřej Cink (Switzerland) Tina Züger | (Germany) Benjamin Krüger (Czech Republic) Kateřina Uhmanová | (Czech Republic) Jan Rajchart (Czech Republic) Blanka Vaněčková | |
| 20–22 September | MTB French Cup - XCO/XCE | (France) Agde | 1 | (France) Athys Bedini (XCO) (France) Léna Gérault (XCO) (France) Thibaut Kahlhoven (XCE) (France) Isaure Medde (XCE) | (France) Léo Bartoletti (XCO) (France) Noémie Garnier (XCO) (France) Ludovic Delpech (XCE) (France) Coline Clauzure (XCE) | (France) Yannis Musy (XCO) (France) Constance Valentin (XCO) (France) Athys Bedini (XCE) (France) Flavie Guille (XCE) | |
| 21 September | Nockstein Trophy | (Austria) Koppl | 2 | (Austria) Max Foidl (Austria) Tamara Wiedmann | (Austria) Mario Bair (Germany) Leonie Daubermann | (Germany) Sven Strähle (Slovenia) Vita Movrin | |
| 21 September | MTB Eliminator Turieckap - XCE | (Slovakia) Turčianske Teplice | 3 | (Slovakia) Matúš Mazan (Czech Republic) Adéla Pernická | (Slovakia) Matej Švoňava (Slovakia) Vanesa Šatková | (Slovakia) Lukáš Vranák (Slovakia) Kristína Tichá | |
| 21 September | MTB Eliminator Girona - XCE | (Spain) Girona | 3 | (Belgium) Jarne Vandersteen (Italy) Gaia Tormena | (France) Lorenzo Serres (Spain) Marta Cano Espinosa | (Netherlands) Lehvi Braam (Netherlands) Annemoon van Dienst | |
| 21–22 September | Wombacher Bike Tage | (Germany) Lohr am Main | 2 | (Germany) Maximilian Brandl (Netherlands) Anne Terpstra | (Germany) Leon Kaiser (Germany) Nina Benz | (Germany) Tobias König (Germany) Lia Schrievers | |
| 21–22 September | Homemountain Bike Cup | (Bulgaria) Sofia | 2 | (Bulgaria) Valentin Tenev (Bulgaria) Denitsa Tosheva | (Bulgaria) Dimitar Mazneykov (Bulgaria) Doroteya Borisova | (United Kingdom) Elliot Lees | |
| 21–22 September | Portugal Cup XCO - Avis International XCO | (Portugal) Avis | 2 | (Portugal) Roberto Ferreira (Portugal) Ana Santos | (Portugal) João Cruz (Portugal) Leandra Gomes | (Portugal) Ricardo Marinheiro (Portugal) Laura Simão | |
| 21–22 September | Swiss Bike Cup Lenzerheide | (Switzerland) Lenzerheide | 1 | (Switzerland) Luke Wiedmann (Switzerland) Ramona Forchini | (Switzerland) Filippo Colombo (Switzerland) Lea Huber | (Switzerland) Fabio Püntener (Switzerland) Seraina Leugger | |
| 21–22 September | Karl XII Rittet | (Norway) Halden | 1 | (Norway) Sondre Rokke (XCC) (Norway) Hedda Brenningen Bjørklund (XCC) (Norway) Mats Tubaas Glende (XCO) (Denmark) Caroline Bohé (XCO) | (Sweden) Edvin Elofsson (XCC) (Norway) Oda Laforce (XCC) (Norway) Knut Røhme (XCO) (Norway) Lisa Kristine Jorde (XCO) | (Norway) Marius Aune (XCC) (Norway) Sigrid Andrea Fløgstad (XCC) (Norway) Ole Sigurd Rekdahl (XCO) (Norway) Hedda Brenningen Bjørklund (XCO) | |
| 22 September | Shimano Supercup Massi Girona | (Spain) Girona | 1 | (New Zealand) Sam Gaze (Italy) Chiara Teocchi | (Spain) David Campos (Australia) Rebecca Henderson | (Belgium) Jens Schuermans (Netherlands) Anne Tauber | |
| 22 September | Rize MTB Cup | (Turkey) Rize | 1 | (Turkey) Emre Yavuz; Tatiana Saitarova | (Turkey) Ufuk Taş (Iran) Fatemeh Abbasi | (Turkey) Furkan Akçam (Turkey) Eki̇n Ereke | |
| 27 September | Aras Geopark MTB Race | (Iran) Aras Free Zone | 2 | (Iran) Farshid Salahian | (Iran) Faraz Shokri | (Iran) Benyamin Fanaei Bonakdar | |
| 27 September | #4 CIMTB - Congonhas 20 Years - XCC Class 3 - Elite | (Brazil) Congonhas | 3 | (Brazil) Ulan Bastos Galinski (Brazil) Karen Olímpio | (Brazil) José Gabriel Marques (Brazil) Iara Caetano | (Brazil) Gustavo Xavier de Oliveira (Brazil) Ana Laura Oliveira Moraes | |
| 28–29 September | Coupe du Japon Misaka International | (Japan) Shimonoseki | 3 | (Japan) Tatsuumi Soejima (Australia) Isabella Flint | (Japan) Sho Takahashi (Chinese Taipei) Tsai Ya-yu | (Japan) Riki Kitabayashi (Japan) Yui Ishida | |
| 29 September | #4 CIMTB - Congonhas 20 Years - XCO Class 1 - Elite | (Brazil) Congonhas | 1 | (Brazil) Gustavo Xavier de Oliveira (Brazil) Karen Olímpio | (Brazil) José Gabriel Marques (Brazil) Isabella Lacerda | (Brazil) Ulan Bastos Galinski (Brazil) Letícia Cândido | |
| 29 September | Hellenic XCO Mountain Bike #4 | (Greece) Kos | 2 | (Greece) Alexandros Athanasiadis (Greece) Eleftheria Giachou | Yaroslav Shvedov (Greece) Athina Tzoulaki | (Czech Republic) Zdeněk Vobecký | |
| 29 September | Bike Marathon Pulmón de Acero - XCM | (Spain) Barakaldo | 2 | (Spain) Sergio Mantecón Gutiérrez (Spain) Pilar Fernández | (Spain) Miguel Muñoz Moreno (Spain) Cristina Rico | (Spain) Martín Mata (Spain) María Reyes Murillo | |
| 29 September | VII. Kanizsa Kupa | (Hungary) Nagykanizsa | 3 | (Hungary) Zsombor Palumby (Hungary) Virág Buzsáki | (Hungary) Bálint Feldhoffer (Ukraine) Mariia Sukhopalova | (Hungary) András Szatmáry (Hungary) Csenge Bokros | |
| 29 September | 23° La Dario Acquaroli Internazionale | (Italy) Iseo | 3 | (Italy) Gioele De Cosmo (Italy) Mara Fumagalli | (Italy) Jacopo Billi (Italy) Giorgia Marchet | (Italy) Nicola Taffarel (Italy) Debora Piana | |

=== October ===
| Date | Race Name | Location | Class | Winner | Second | Third | Ref |
|---|---|---|---|---|---|---|---|
| 1–5 October | Momentum Medical Scheme Cape Pioneer Trek | (South Africa) Oudtshoorn | S1 | (South Africa) Arno Du Toit (South Africa) Keagan Bontekoning (South Africa) Danielle Strydom (South Africa) Samantha Sanders | (South Africa) Jaedon Terlouw (South Africa) Pieter Du Toit (South Africa) Steph Wohlters (South Africa) Kelsey Van Schoor | (South Africa) Cronje Beukes (South Africa) Rossouw Bekker (South Africa) Katie Lennard (South Africa) Ila Stow | |
| 4–6 October | iXS Downhill Cup | (Switzerland) — | 2 | (Switzerland) Nicolas Baechler (Norway) Kine Haugom | (Switzerland) Basil Weber (Belgium) Siel van der Velden | (Switzerland) Lutz Weber (Switzerland) Ramona Kupferschmied | |
| 5 October | Tierra Estella Epic - XCM | (Spain) Ayegui – Aiegi | 1 | (Spain) Pablo Rodríguez (Spain) Ainara Elbusto | (Spain) Roberto Bou Martín (Spain) Estíbaliz Sagardoy | (Spain) Miguel Muñoz Moreno (Spain) Anjara Andueza | |
| 6 October | Extreme sur loue - XCM | (France) Ornans | HC | (Switzerland) Hansueli Stauffer (Switzerland) Alessia Nay | (Germany) Simon Schneller (Italy) Costanza Fasolis | (Germany) Jakob Hartmann (France) Laura Lavry | |
| 6 October | Mardin MTB Cup | (Turkey) Mardin | 2 | (Turkey) Ömer Boyraz (Turkey) Sevim Gerçek | (Turkey) Ufuk Taș (Turkey) Melike Yigit | (Turkey) Ibrahim Gülmez (Turkey) Buse Yücel | |
| 11 October | Roc d'Azur - XCM | (France) Fréjus | HC | (Switzerland) Casey South (France) Loana Lecomte | (Italy) Fabian Rabensteiner (Italy) Sandra Mairhofer | (Belgium) Wout Alleman (Switzerland) Chrystelle Baumann | |
| 12–13 October | Campeonato Suramericano de MTB | (Argentina) Balcarce | 2 | (Argentina) Agustín Durán (Chile) Yarela González | (Argentina) Fernando Contreras (Argentina) Agustina Quirós | (Argentina) Juan Ignacio Goudailliez (Argentina) Lucia Miralles | |
| 12–13 October | Taça Brasil de XCO SP | (Brazil) Araçoiaba da Serra | 2 | (Brazil) Gustavo Xavier de Oliveira (XCC) (Brazil) Luiza Cocuzzi (XCC) (Brazil) Gustavo Xavier de Oliveira (XCO) (Brazil) Carolina Ferreira (XCO) | (Brazil) Luiz Cocuzzi (XCC) (Brazil) Carolina Ferreira (XCC) (Brazil) Mario Couto Grego (XCO) (Brazil) Luiza Cocuzzi (XCO) | (Brazil) Mario Couto Grego (XCC) (Brazil) Larissa Cristina da Silva (XCC) (Brazil) Eiki Yamauchi Leoncio (XCO) (Brazil) Larissa Cristina da Silva (XCO) | |
| 13 October | Helaz XCO Series 2 | (Malaysia) Johor Bahru | 2 | (Indonesia) Zaenal Fanani (Malaysia) Phi Kun Pan | (Indonesia) Feri Yudoyono (Philippines) Shagne Paula Yaoyao | (Malaysia) Zulfikri Zulkifli (Indonesia) Sayu Bella Sukma Dewi | |

=== November ===
| Date | Race Name | Location | Class | Winner | Second | Third | Ref |
|---|---|---|---|---|---|---|---|
| 10 November | 76 Indonesian Downhill #3 | (Indonesia) Malang | 1 | (United Kingdom) Bernard Kerr (Indonesia) Ayu Triya Andriana | (Canada) Benny de Vall (Indonesia) Milatul Khaqimah | (Indonesia) Dois Audi Fikriansyah (Indonesia) Riska Amelia Agustina | |
| 17 November | Kendal Downhill 2024 | (Indonesia) Kendal | 2 | (New Zealand) Bryn Dickerson (Indonesia) Riska Amelia Agustina | (Indonesia) Pahraz Salman Al Parisi (Indonesia) Milatul Khaqimah | (Indonesia) Dois Audi Fikriansyah (Thailand) Vipavee Deekaballes | |
| 17 November | ASEAN 1st Mountain Bike Championships | (Philippines) Passi | 2 | (Philippines) Adrian Nacario (Philippines) Shagne Paula Yaoyao | (Thailand) Phunsiri Sirimongkhon (Malaysia) Phi Kun Pan | (Philippines) James Carl Dela Cruz (Malaysia) Nur Deena Safia Nor Effandy | |
| 23–24 November | Extreme Urbenduro Malta | (Malta) Valletta | 3 | (Czech Republic) Tomáš Slavík (United Kingdom) Chloe Taylor | (Czech Republic) Martin Brza (Italy) Veronika Widmann | (United Kingdom) Harry Molloy (United Kingdom) Rebecca Baraona | |

=== December ===
| Date | Race Name | Location | Class | Winner | Second | Third | Ref |
|---|---|---|---|---|---|---|---|
| 7–8 December | Copa Sudamericana DHI | (Chile) Temuco | 2 | (Chile) Mauricio Acuña Quintana (Chile) Paz Gallo Fuentes | (Chile) Felipe Benavides Venegas (Chile) Fernanda Gildemeister Menzel | (Chile) Cesar Próvoste Ormeño (Chile) Maria Galmez De La Jara | |
| 22 December | Helaz XCO Series 3 | (Malaysia) Putrajaya | 2 | (Indonesia) Zaenal Fanani (Indonesia) Sayu Bella Sukma Dewi | (Indonesia) Feri Yudoyono (Malaysia) Phi Kun Pan | (Malaysia) Muhammad Syawal Mazlin (Philippines) Shagne Paula Yaoyao | |

== 2024 Summer Olympics ==
=== Mountain biking ===
| Event | Gold | Silver | Bronze |
|---|---|---|---|
| Men's cross-country | Tom Pidcock; Great Britain | Victor Koretzky; France | Alan Hatherly; South Africa |
| Women's cross-country | Pauline Ferrand-Prévot; France | Haley Batten; United States | Jenny Rissveds; Sweden |

== 2024 UCI MTB World Series ==
=== XCO ===
| Date | Venue | Podium (Men) | | Podium (Women) | |
|---|---|---|---|---|---|
| WC #1; 12–14 April 2024 | Brazil; Mairiporã | 1 | Christopher Blevins (USA) | 1 | Jenny Rissveds (SWE) |
| WC #1; 12–14 April 2024 | Brazil; Mairiporã | 2 | Victor Koretzky (FRA) | 2 | Savilia Blunk (USA) |
| WC #1; 12–14 April 2024 | Brazil; Mairiporã | 3 | Filippo Colombo (SUI) | 3 | Haley Batten (USA) |
| WC #2; 19–21 April 2024 | Brazil; Araxá | 1 | Simon Andreassen (DEN) | 1 | Haley Batten (USA) |
| WC #2; 19–21 April 2024 | Brazil; Araxá | 2 | Victor Koretzky (FRA) | 2 | Jenny Rissveds (SWE) |
| WC #2; 19–21 April 2024 | Brazil; Araxá | 3 | Alan Hatherly (RSA) | 3 | Savilia Blunk (USA) |
| WC #3; 24–26 May 2024 | Czech Republic; Nové Město na Moravě | 1 | Tom Pidcock (GBR) | 1 | Pauline Ferrand-Prévot (FRA) |
| WC #3; 24–26 May 2024 | Czech Republic; Nové Město na Moravě | 2 | Nino Schurter (SUI) | 2 | Haley Batten (USA) |
| WC #3; 24–26 May 2024 | Czech Republic; Nové Město na Moravě | 3 | Marcel Guerrini (SUI) | 3 | Alessandra Keller (SUI) |
| WC #4; 16 June 2024 | Italy; Val di Sole | 1 | Nino Schurter (SUI) | 1 | Pauline Ferrand-Prévot (FRA) |
| WC #4; 16 June 2024 | Italy; Val di Sole | 2 | Alan Hatherly (RSA) | 2 | Puck Pieterse (NED) |
| WC #4; 16 June 2024 | Italy; Val di Sole | 3 | Mathis Azzaro (FRA) | 3 | Candice Lill (RSA) |
| WC #5; 21–23 June 2024 | Switzerland; Crans-Montana | 1 | Tom Pidcock (GBR) | 1 | Loana Lecomte (FRA) |
| WC #5; 21–23 June 2024 | Switzerland; Crans-Montana | 2 | Mathias Flückiger (SUI) | 2 | Alessandra Keller (SUI) |
| WC #5; 21–23 June 2024 | Switzerland; Crans-Montana | 3 | Luca Braidot (ITA) | 3 | Puck Pieterse (NED) |
| WC #6; 28 June – 7 July 2024 | France; Haute-Savoie | 1 | Alan Hatherly (RSA) | 1 | Puck Pieterse (NED) |
| WC #6; 28 June – 7 July 2024 | France; Haute-Savoie | 2 | Mathias Flückiger (SUI) | 2 | Candice Lill (RSA) |
| WC #6; 28 June – 7 July 2024 | France; Haute-Savoie | 3 | Simon Andreassen (DEN) | 3 | Alessandra Keller (SUI) |

=== XCC ===
| Date | Venue | Podium (Men) | | Podium (Women) | |
|---|---|---|---|---|---|
| WC #1; 12–14 April 2024 | Brazil; Mairiporã | 1 | Sam Gaze (NZL) | 1 | Evie Richards (GBR) |
| WC #1; 12–14 April 2024 | Brazil; Mairiporã | 2 | Luca Schwarzbauer (GER) | 2 | Rebecca Henderson (AUS) |
| WC #1; 12–14 April 2024 | Brazil; Mairiporã | 3 | Martín Vidaurre (CHI) | 3 | Alessandra Keller (SUI) |
| WC #2; 19–21 April 2024 | Brazil; Araxá | 1 | Victor Koretzky (FRA) | 1 | Haley Batten (USA) |
| WC #2; 19–21 April 2024 | Brazil; Araxá | 2 | Christopher Blevins (USA) | 2 | Linda Indergand (SUI) |
| WC #2; 19–21 April 2024 | Brazil; Araxá | 3 | Alan Hatherly (RSA) | 3 | Savilia Blunk (USA) |
| WC #3; 24–26 May 2024 | Czech Republic; Nové Město na Moravě | 1 | Victor Koretzky (FRA) | 1 | Alessandra Keller (SUI) |
| WC #3; 24–26 May 2024 | Czech Republic; Nové Město na Moravě | 2 | Christopher Blevins (USA) | 2 | Pauline Ferrand-Prévot (FRA) |
| WC #3; 24–26 May 2024 | Czech Republic; Nové Město na Moravě | 3 | Thomas Litscher (SUI) | 3 | Haley Batten (USA) |
| WC #4; 15 June 2024 | Italy; Val di Sole | 1 | Sam Gaze (NZL) | 1 | Puck Pieterse (NED) |
| WC #4; 15 June 2024 | Italy; Val di Sole | 2 | Victor Koretzky (FRA) | 2 | Pauline Ferrand-Prévot (FRA) |
| WC #4; 15 June 2024 | Italy; Val di Sole | 3 | Jens Schuermans (BEL) | 3 | Savilia Blunk (USA) |
| WC #5; 21–23 June 2024 | Switzerland; Crans-Montana | 1 | Tom Pidcock (GBR) | 1 | Puck Pieterse (NED) |
| WC #5; 21–23 June 2024 | Switzerland; Crans-Montana | 2 | Julian Schelb (GER) | 2 | Alessandra Keller (SUI) |
| WC #5; 21–23 June 2024 | Switzerland; Crans-Montana | 3 | Luca Braidot (ITA) | 3 | Anne Tauber (NED) |
| WC #6; 28 June – 7 July 2024 | France; Haute-Savoie | 1 | Alan Hatherly (RSA) | 1 | Alessandra Keller (SUI) |
| WC #6; 28 June – 7 July 2024 | France; Haute-Savoie | 2 | Charlie Aldridge (GBR) | 2 | Puck Pieterse (NED) |
| WC #6; 28 June – 7 July 2024 | France; Haute-Savoie | 3 | Sam Gaze (NZL) | 3 | Rebecca Henderson (AUS) |

=== XCE ===
| Date | Venue | Podium (Men) | | Podium (Women) | |
|---|---|---|---|---|---|
| WC #1; 20 April 2024 | France; Paris | 1 | Ede-Károly Molnár (ROU) | 1 | Marion Fromberger (GER) |
| WC #1; 20 April 2024 | France; Paris | 2 | Edvin Lindh (SWE) | 2 | Gaia Tormena (ITA) |
| WC #1; 20 April 2024 | France; Paris | 3 | Jakob Klemenčič (SVN) | 3 | Margaux Borrelly (FRA) |
| WC #2; 26 April 2024 | Spain; Barcelona | 1 | Lorenzo Serres (FRA) | 1 | Gaia Tormena (ITA) |
| WC #2; 26 April 2024 | Spain; Barcelona | 2 | Nils Riecker (GER) | 2 | Annemoon van Dienst (NED) |
| WC #2; 26 April 2024 | Spain; Barcelona | 3 | Titouan Perrin-Ganier (FRA) | 3 | Marta Cano Espinosa (ESP) |
| WC #3; 19 May 2024 | Indonesia; Palangka Raya | 1 | Lochlan Brown (NZL) | 1 | Didi de Vries (NED) |
| WC #3; 19 May 2024 | Indonesia; Palangka Raya | 2 | Riyadh Hakim Bin Lukman (SIN) | 2 | Madison Boissiere (FRA) |
| WC #3; 19 May 2024 | Indonesia; Palangka Raya | 3 | Theo Hauser (AUT) | 3 | Vipavee Deekaballes (THA) |
| WC #4; 26 May 2024 | Turkey; Sakarya Province | 1 | Edvin Lindh (SWE) | 1 | Gaia Tormena (ITA) |
| WC #4; 26 May 2024 | Turkey; Sakarya Province | 2 | Theo Hauser (AUT) | 2 | Didi de Vries (NED) |
| WC #4; 26 May 2024 | Turkey; Sakarya Province | 3 | Jakob Klemenčič (SVN) | 3 | Line Mygdam (DEN) |
| WC #5; 2 June 2024 | Belgium; Leuven | 1 | Theo Hauser (AUT) | 1 | Gaia Tormena (ITA) |
| WC #5; 2 June 2024 | Belgium; Leuven | 2 | Edvin Lindh (SWE) | 2 | Coline Clauzure (FRA) |
| WC #5; 2 June 2024 | Belgium; Leuven | 3 | Lorenzo Serres (FRA) | 3 | Line Mygdam (DEN) |
| WC #6; 18 August 2024 | Brazil; São Paulo | 1 | Edvin Lindh (SWE) | 1 | Marion Fromberger (GER) |
| WC #6; 18 August 2024 | Brazil; São Paulo | 2 | Luiz Cocuzzi (BRA) | 2 | Iara Caetano Leite (BRA) |
| WC #6; 18 August 2024 | Brazil; São Paulo | 3 | Ede-Károly Molnár (ROU) | 3 | Didi de Vries (NED) |

=== XCM ===
| Date | Venue | Podium (Men) | | Podium (Women) | |
|---|---|---|---|---|---|
| WC #1; 24–26 May 2024 | Czech Republic; Nové Město na Moravě | 1 | Fabian Rabensteiner (ITA) | 1 | Vera Looser (NAM) |
| WC #1; 24–26 May 2024 | Czech Republic; Nové Město na Moravě | 2 | Alex Miller (NAM) | 2 | Lejla Njemčević (BIH) |
| WC #1; 24–26 May 2024 | Czech Republic; Nové Město na Moravě | 3 | Samuele Porro (ITA) | 3 | Rosa van Doorn (NED) |
| WC #2; 28 June – 7 July 2024 | France; Haute-Savoie | 1 | Héctor Leonardo Páez (COL) | 1 | Lejla Njemčević (BIH) |
| WC #2; 28 June – 7 July 2024 | France; Haute-Savoie | 2 | Andreas Seewald (GER) | 2 | Hannah Otto (USA) |
| WC #2; 28 June – 7 July 2024 | France; Haute-Savoie | 3 | Samuele Porro (ITA) | 3 | Vera Looser (NAM) |

=== E–MTB ===
| Date | Venue | Podium (Men) | | Podium (Women) | |
|---|---|---|---|---|---|
| WC #1; 1 June 2024 | Italy; Arco | 1 | Jérôme Gilloux (FRA) | 1 | Sofia Wiedenroth (GER) |
| WC #1; 1 June 2024 | Italy; Arco | 2 | Joris Ryf (SUI) | 2 | Anna Spielmann (AUT) |
| WC #1; 1 June 2024 | Italy; Arco | 3 | Mirko Tabacchi (ITA) | 3 | Nathalie Schneitter (SUI) |
| WC #2; 2 June 2024 | Italy; Arco | 1 | Jérôme Gilloux (FRA) | 1 | Nathalie Schneitter (SUI) |
| WC #2; 2 June 2024 | Italy; Arco | 2 | Mirko Tabacchi (ITA) | 2 | Anna Spielmann (AUT) |
| WC #2; 2 June 2024 | Italy; Arco | 3 | Joris Ryf (SUI) | 3 | Sofia Wiedenroth (GER) |

=== DHI ===
| Date | Venue | Podium (Men) | | Podium (Women) | |
|---|---|---|---|---|---|
| WC #1; 3–5 May 2024 | United Kingdom; Fort William | 1 | Loïc Bruni (FRA) | 1 | Valentina Höll (AUT) |
| WC #1; 3–5 May 2024 | United Kingdom; Fort William | 2 | Troy Brosnan (AUS) | 2 | Nina Hoffmann (GER) |
| WC #1; 3–5 May 2024 | United Kingdom; Fort William | 3 | Finn Iles (CAN) | 3 | Tahnée Seagrave (GBR) |
| WC #2; 17–19 May 2024 | Poland; Bielsko-Biała | 1 | Rónán Dunne (IRL) | 1 | Marine Cabirou (FRA) |
| WC #2; 17–19 May 2024 | Poland; Bielsko-Biała | 2 | Loïc Bruni (FRA) | 2 | Camille Balanche (SUI) |
| WC #2; 17–19 May 2024 | Poland; Bielsko-Biała | 3 | Loris Vergier (FRA) | 3 | Nina Hoffmann (GER) |
| WC #3; 7–9 June 2024 | Austria; Leogang | 1 | Loïc Bruni (FRA) | 1 | Valentina Höll (FRA) |
| WC #3; 7–9 June 2024 | Austria; Leogang | 2 | Finn Iles (CAN) | 2 | Anna Newkirk (USA) |
| WC #3; 7–9 June 2024 | Austria; Leogang | 3 | Lachlan Stevens-McNab (NZL) | 3 | Myriam Nicole (FRA) |
| WC #4; 14–16 June 2024 | Italy; Val di Sole | 1 | Amaury Pierron (FRA) | 1 | Tahnée Seagrave (GBR) |
| WC #4; 14–16 June 2024 | Italy; Val di Sole | 2 | Dakotah Norton (USA) | 2 | Marine Cabirou (FRA) |
| WC #4; 14–16 June 2024 | Italy; Val di Sole | 3 | Finn Iles (CAN) | 3 | Monika Hrastnik (SVN) |
| WC #5; 28 June – 7 July 2024 | France; Haute-Savoie | 1 | Amaury Pierron (FRA) | 1 | Eleonora Farina (ITA) |
| WC #5; 28 June – 7 July 2024 | France; Haute-Savoie | 2 | Andreas Kolb (AUT) | 2 | Mille Johnset (NOR) |
| WC #5; 28 June – 7 July 2024 | France; Haute-Savoie | 3 | Greg Minnaar (RSA) | 3 | Tahnée Seagrave (GBR) |

=== END ===
| Date | Venue | Podium (Men) | | Podium (Women) | |
|---|---|---|---|---|---|
| WC #1; 10–12 May 2024 | Italy; Finale Outdoor Region | 1 | Richard Rude Jr. (USA) | 1 | Harriet Harnden (GBR) |
| WC #1; 10–12 May 2024 | Italy; Finale Outdoor Region | 2 | Charles Murray (NZL) | 2 | Isabeau Courdurier (FRA) |
| WC #1; 10–12 May 2024 | Italy; Finale Outdoor Region | 3 | Martin Maes (BEL) | 3 | Ella Conolly (GBR) |
| WC #2; 17–19 May 2024 | Poland; Bielsko-Biała | 1 | Charles Murray (NZL) | 1 | Isabeau Courdurier (FRA) |
| WC #2; 17–19 May 2024 | Poland; Bielsko-Biała | 2 | Sławomir Łukasik (POL) | 2 | Harriet Harnden (GBR) |
| WC #2; 17–19 May 2024 | Poland; Bielsko-Biała | 3 | Richard Rude Jr. (USA) | 3 | Chloe Taylor (GBR) |
| WC #3; 7–9 June 2024 | Austria; Leogang | 1 | Richard Rude Jr. (USA) | 1 | Isabeau Courdurier (FRA) |
| WC #3; 7–9 June 2024 | Austria; Leogang | 2 | Alex Rudeau (FRA) | 2 | Harriet Harnden (GBR) |
| WC #3; 7–9 June 2024 | Austria; Leogang | 3 | Sławomir Łukasik (POL) | 3 | Morgane Charre (FRA) |
| WC #4; 28 June – 7 July 2024 | France; Haute-Savoie | 1 | Richard Rude Jr. (USA) | 1 | Morgane Charre (FRA) |
| WC #4; 28 June – 7 July 2024 | France; Haute-Savoie | 2 | Luke Meier-Smith (AUS) | 2 | Isabeau Courdurier (FRA) |
| WC #4; 28 June – 7 July 2024 | France; Haute-Savoie | 3 | Alex Rudeau (FRA) | 3 | Ella Conolly (GBR) |
| WC #5; 12–14 July 2024 | Switzerland; Bellwald | 1 | Jack Moir (AUS) | 1 | Harriet Harnden (GBR) |
| WC #5; 12–14 July 2024 | Switzerland; Bellwald | 2 | Sławomir Łukasik (POL) | 2 | Ella Conolly (GBR) |
| WC #5; 12–14 July 2024 | Switzerland; Bellwald | 3 | Richard Rude Jr. (USA) | 3 | Isabeau Courdurier (FRA) |

=== E–END ===
| Date | Venue | Podium (Men) | | Podium (Women) | |
|---|---|---|---|---|---|
| WC #1; 10–12 May 2024 | Italy; Finale Outdoor Region | 1 | Ryan Gilchrist (AUS) | 1 | Florencia Espiñeira (CHI) |
| WC #1; 10–12 May 2024 | Italy; Finale Outdoor Region | 2 | José Borges (POR) | 2 | Tracy Moseley (GBR) |
| WC #1; 10–12 May 2024 | Italy; Finale Outdoor Region | 3 | Ceccé Camoin (FRA) | 3 | Laura Charles (FRA) |
| WC #2; 17–19 May 2024 | Poland; Bielsko-Biała | 1 | Sławomir Łukasik (POL) | 1 | Florencia Espiñeira (CHI) |
| WC #2; 17–19 May 2024 | Poland; Bielsko-Biała | 2 | José Borges (POR) | 2 | Tracy Moseley (GBR) |
| WC #2; 17–19 May 2024 | Poland; Bielsko-Biała | 3 | Ryan Gilchrist (AUS) | 3 | Laura Charles (FRA) |
| WC #3; 7–9 June 2024 | Austria; Leogang | 1 | Martin Maes (BEL) | 1 | Florencia Espiñeira (CHI) |
| WC #3; 7–9 June 2024 | Austria; Leogang | 2 | Lévy Batista (FRA) | 2 | Laura Charles (FRA) |
| WC #3; 7–9 June 2024 | Austria; Leogang | 3 | Kévin Miquel (FRA) | 3 | Sofia Wiedenroth (GER) |
| WC #4; 28 June – 7 July 2024 | France; Haute-Savoie | 1 | Antoine Rogge (FRA) | 1 | Estelle Charles (FRA) |
| WC #4; 28 June – 7 July 2024 | France; Haute-Savoie | 2 | Damien Oton (FRA) | 2 | Florencia Espiñeira (CHI) |
| WC #4; 28 June – 7 July 2024 | France; Haute-Savoie | 3 | Ryan Gilchrist (AUS) | 3 | George Swift (NZL) |
| WC #5; 12–14 July 2024 | Switzerland; Bellwald | 1 | Ryan Gilchrist (AUS) | 1 | Florencia Espiñeira (CHI) |
| WC #5; 12–14 July 2024 | Switzerland; Bellwald | 2 | Kévin Marry (FRA) | 2 | Raphaela Richter (GER) |
| WC #5; 12–14 July 2024 | Switzerland; Bellwald | 3 | José Borges (POR) | 3 | Alia Marcellini (ITA) |

== National Championships ==
=== Albania ===
| Date | Venue | Podium (Men) | | Podium (Women) | |
|---|---|---|---|---|---|
| XCO; 20 July 2024 | Albania; Tirana | 1 | Olsian Velia | 1 | Keti Fetishi |
| XCO; 20 July 2024 | Albania; Tirana | 2 | Orgest Noka | 2 | Ornela Dule |
| XCO; 20 July 2024 | Albania; Tirana | 3 | Henri Hysa | 3 | Dea Cela |

=== Argentina ===
| Date | Venue | Podium (Men) | | Podium (Women) | |
|---|---|---|---|---|---|
| XCO; 20–21 July 2024 | Argentina; San Luis | 1 | Joel Fernando Contreras | 1 | Agustina Apaza |
| XCO; 20–21 July 2024 | Argentina; San Luis | 2 | Agustín Durán | 2 | Agustina Quirós |
| XCO; 20–21 July 2024 | Argentina; San Luis | 3 | Álvaro Macías | 3 | Inés Gutiérrez |

| Date | Venue | Podium (Men) | | Podium (Women) | |
|---|---|---|---|---|---|
| XCC; 20–21 July 2024 | Argentina; San Luis | 1 | Joel Fernando Contreras | 1 | Agustina Apaza |
| XCC; 20–21 July 2024 | Argentina; San Luis | 2 | Agustín Durán | 2 | María Constanza Pezzotti Sosa |
| XCC; 20–21 July 2024 | Argentina; San Luis | 3 | Joaquin Gabriel Vera | 3 | Yesica Cantelmi |

| Date | Venue | Podium (Men) | | Podium (Women) | |
|---|---|---|---|---|---|
| SHI; 20–21 July 2024 | Argentina; San Luis | 1 | Alexis Goenaga | 1 | Catalina Calderón |
| SHI; 20–21 July 2024 | Argentina; San Luis | 2 | Facundo Descalzo | 2 | María José Muñoz |
| SHI; 20–21 July 2024 | Argentina; San Luis | 3 | Pablo Seewald | 3 | Belén Petcoff |

| Date | Venue | Podium (Men) | | Podium (Women) | |
|---|---|---|---|---|---|
| E-XC; 20–21 July 2024 | Argentina; San Luis | 1 | Sebastián Buzon | 1 | ? |
| E-XC; 20–21 July 2024 | Argentina; San Luis | 2 | Federico de Mula | 2 | ? |
| E-XC; 20–21 July 2024 | Argentina; San Luis | 3 | Federico Brizzi | 3 | ? |

=== Austria ===
| Date | Venue | Podium (Men) | | Podium (Women) | |
|---|---|---|---|---|---|
| XCO; 12–14 July 2024 | Austria; Stattegg | 1 | Max Foidl | 1 | Laura Stigger |
| XCO; 12–14 July 2024 | Austria; Stattegg | 2 | Daniel Eichmair | 2 | Mona Mitterwallner |
| XCO; 12–14 July 2024 | Austria; Stattegg | 3 | Armin Embacher | 3 | Tamara Wiedmann |

| Date | Venue | Podium (Men) | | Podium (Women) | |
|---|---|---|---|---|---|
| XCC; 12–14 July 2024 | Austria; Stattegg | 1 | Alexander Hammerle | 1 | Laura Stigger |
| XCC; 12–14 July 2024 | Austria; Stattegg | 2 | Julius Scherrer | 2 | Tamara Wiedmann |
| XCC; 12–14 July 2024 | Austria; Stattegg | 3 | Lukas Hatz | 3 | Katharina Sadnik |

| Date | Venue | Podium (Men) | | Podium (Women) | |
|---|---|---|---|---|---|
| XCE; 7 July 2024 | Austria; Stattegg | 1 | Theo Hauser | 1 | Valentina Gruber |
| XCE; 7 July 2024 | Austria; Stattegg | 2 | Dominik Gaßner | 2 | Nicole Sommer |
| XCE; 7 July 2024 | Austria; Stattegg | 3 | Jan Dirisamer | 3 | Sophia Knaubert |

| Date | Venue | Podium (Men) | | Podium (Women) | |
|---|---|---|---|---|---|
| DHI; 22–23 June 2024 | Austria; St. Radegund | 1 | Andreas Kolb | 1 | Kerstin Sallegger |
| DHI; 22–23 June 2024 | Austria; St. Radegund | 2 | Kilian Schnöller | 2 | Helene Fruhwirth |
| DHI; 22–23 June 2024 | Austria; St. Radegund | 3 | David Trummer | 3 | Marlena Neißl |

=== Australia ===
| Date | Venue | Podium (Men) | | Podium (Women) | |
|---|---|---|---|---|---|
| XCO; 12–17 March 2024 | Australia; Awaba | 1 | Cameron Ivory | 1 | Rebecca Henderson |
| XCO; 12–17 March 2024 | Australia; Awaba | 2 | Jack Ward | 2 | Zoe Cuthbert |
| XCO; 12–17 March 2024 | Australia; Awaba | 3 | Daniel McConnell | 3 | Katherine Hosking |

| Date | Venue | Podium (Men) | | Podium (Women) | |
|---|---|---|---|---|---|
| XCC; 12–17 March 2024 | Australia; Awaba | 1 | Daniel McConnell | 1 | Zoe Cuthbert |
| XCC; 12–17 March 2024 | Australia; Awaba | 2 | Scott Bowden | 2 | Alice Patterson-Robert |
| XCC; 12–17 March 2024 | Australia; Awaba | 3 | Jared Graves | 3 | Ella Bloor |

| Date | Venue | Podium (Men) | | Podium (Women) | |
|---|---|---|---|---|---|
| XCM; 5 May 2024 | Australia; Wagga Wagga | 1 | Brendan Johnston | 1 | Courtney Sherwell |
| XCM; 5 May 2024 | Australia; Wagga Wagga | 2 | Scott Bowden | 2 | Isabella Flint |
| XCM; 5 May 2024 | Australia; Wagga Wagga | 3 | Daniel McConnell | 3 | Ella Bloor |

| Date | Venue | Podium (Men) | | Podium (Women) | |
|---|---|---|---|---|---|
| Downhill; 12–17 March 2024 | Australia; Awaba | 1 | Luke Meier-Smith | 1 | Ellie Smith |
| Downhill; 12–17 March 2024 | Australia; Awaba | 2 | Jack Moir | 2 | Elise Empey |
| Downhill; 12–17 March 2024 | Australia; Awaba | 3 | Troy Brosnan | 3 | Ashleigh Weinert |

| Date | Venue | Podium (Men) | | Podium (Women) | |
|---|---|---|---|---|---|
| E-Bike; 12–17 March 2024 | Australia; Awaba | 1 | Jon Odams | 1 | Jessica Hoskin |
| E-Bike; 12–17 March 2024 | Australia; Awaba | 2 | Shannon Johnson | 2 | Connor Mielke |
| E-Bike; 12–17 March 2024 | Australia; Awaba | 3 | Thiago Boaretto | 3 | Emma Stevenson |

| Date | Venue | Podium (Men) | | Podium (Women) | |
|---|---|---|---|---|---|
| Pump Track; 12–17 March 2024 | Australia; Awaba | 1 | Ryan Gilchrist | 1 | Elleni Turkovic |
| Pump Track; 12–17 March 2024 | Australia; Awaba | 2 | Jayce Cunning | 2 | Connor Mielke |
| Pump Track; 12–17 March 2024 | Australia; Awaba | 3 | Billy Smidt | 3 | Zoe Cuthbert |

=== Belgium ===
| Date | Venue | Podium (Men) | | Podium (Women) | |
|---|---|---|---|---|---|
| XCO; 19–21 July 2024 | Belgium; Beringen | 1 | Pierre de Froidmont | 1 | Emeline Detilleux |
| XCO; 19–21 July 2024 | Belgium; Beringen | 2 | Daan Soete | 2 | Britt Segers |
| XCO; 19–21 July 2024 | Belgium; Beringen | 3 | Clément Horny | 3 | Tessa Zwaenepoel |

| Date | Venue | Podium (Men) | | Podium (Women) | |
|---|---|---|---|---|---|
| XCO; 19–21 July 2024 | Belgium; Beringen | 1 | Jens Schuermans | 1 | Emeline Detilleux |
| XCO; 19–21 July 2024 | Belgium; Beringen | 2 | Pierre de Froidmont | 2 | Britt Segers |
| XCO; 19–21 July 2024 | Belgium; Beringen | 3 | Daan Soete | 3 | |

=== Bermuda ===
| Date | Venue | Podium (Men) | | Podium (Women) | |
|---|---|---|---|---|---|
| XCO; 24 March 2024 | Bermuda; Warwick Parish | 1 | Robin Horsfield | 1 | Panzy Olander |
| XCO; 24 March 2024 | Bermuda; Warwick Parish | 2 | Che'Quan Richardson | 2 | Caitlin Conyers |
| XCO; 24 March 2024 | Bermuda; Warwick Parish | 3 | Daniel Ringer | 3 | |

=== Bolivia ===
| Date | Venue | Podium (Men) | | Podium (Women) | |
|---|---|---|---|---|---|
| XCO; 20–21 July 2024 | Bolivia; Potosí | 1 | Ever Alejandro Gómez | 1 | Sonia Quiroga Padilla |
| XCO; 20–21 July 2024 | Bolivia; Potosí | 2 | Eduardo Moyata | 2 | Camila Estefani Vargas Grimaldos |
| XCO; 20–21 July 2024 | Bolivia; Potosí | 3 | Miguel Armando Jerez Areco | 3 | Cinthia Álvarez Jaldin |

| Date | Venue | Podium (Men) | | Podium (Women) | |
|---|---|---|---|---|---|
| XCM; 20–21 July 2024 | Bolivia; Potosí | 1 | Miguel Armando Jerez Areco | 1 | Vania Valkhyria Cisneros Rafael |
| XCM; 20–21 July 2024 | Bolivia; Potosí | 2 | David Rojas | 2 | Kenia Karina Almanza Chore |
| XCM; 20–21 July 2024 | Bolivia; Potosí | 3 | Marcos Guido Ortega Hoyos | 3 | Leidy Amurrio Barrientos |

| Date | Venue | Podium (Men) | Podium (Women) |
|---|---|---|---|
| DHI; 20–21 July 2024 | Bolivia; Potosí | 1 | 1 |
| DHI; 20–21 July 2024 | Bolivia; Potosí | 2 | 2 |
| DHI; 20–21 July 2024 | Bolivia; Potosí | 3 | 3 |

=== Bosnia & Herzegovina ===
| Date | Venue | Podium (Men) | | Podium (Women) | |
|---|---|---|---|---|---|
| XCM; 21 April 2024 | Bosnia and Herzegovina; Čapljina | 1 | Ivan Soldo | 1 | Lejla Njemčević |
| XCM; 21 April 2024 | Bosnia and Herzegovina; Čapljina | 2 | Amir Mahmutović | 2 | Nina Vidović |
| XCM; 21 April 2024 | Bosnia and Herzegovina; Čapljina | 3 | Siniša Lukić | 3 | |

=== Brasil ===
| Date | Venue | Podium (Men) | | Podium (Women) | |
|---|---|---|---|---|---|
| XCO; 1–4 August 2024 | Brazil; Congonhas | 1 | Ulan Bastos Galinski | 1 | Raiza Goulão |
| XCO; 1–4 August 2024 | Brazil; Congonhas | 2 | Gustavo Xavier de Oliveira Pereira | 2 | Karen Olímpio |
| XCO; 1–4 August 2024 | Brazil; Congonhas | 3 | Luiz Cocuzzi | 3 | Hercília Najara |

| Date | Venue | Podium (Men) | | Podium (Women) | |
|---|---|---|---|---|---|
| XCC; 1–4 August 2024 | Brazil; Congonhas | 1 | Luiz Cocuzzi | 1 | Giuliana Salvini Morgen |
| XCC; 1–4 August 2024 | Brazil; Congonhas | 2 | Ulan Bastos Galinski | 2 | Karen Olímpio |
| XCC; 1–4 August 2024 | Brazil; Congonhas | 3 | Nicolas Raphael Amancio Romão Machado | 3 | Raiza Goulão |

| Date | Venue | Podium (Men) | | Podium (Women) | |
|---|---|---|---|---|---|
| XCE; 1–4 August 2024 | Brazil; Congonhas | 1 | Luiz Cocuzzi | 1 | Ana Laura Oliveira de Moraes |
| XCE; 1–4 August 2024 | Brazil; Congonhas | 2 | Otávio Queiroz de Souza | 2 | Iara Caetano Leite |
| XCE; 1–4 August 2024 | Brazil; Congonhas | 3 | Daniel Grossi Soares de Souza | 3 | Danielle Maria de Moraes |

| Date | Venue | Podium (Men) | | Podium (Women) | |
|---|---|---|---|---|---|
| XCM; 5 May 2024 | Brazil; Campo do Brito | 1 | Nícolas Machado | 1 | Ana Laura Oliveira de Moraes |
| XCM; 5 May 2024 | Brazil; Campo do Brito | 2 | Carlos Olímpio | 2 | Luiza Cocuzzi |
| XCM; 5 May 2024 | Brazil; Campo do Brito | 3 | Flávio de Jesus Lobo Neto | 3 | Isabella Lacerda |

| Date | Venue | Podium (Men) | | Podium (Women) | |
|---|---|---|---|---|---|
| DHI; 28 July 2024 | Brazil; Pomerode | 1 | Roger Vieira | 1 | Nara Faria |
| DHI; 28 July 2024 | Brazil; Pomerode | 2 | Lucas Borba | 2 | Helen Valentinne Miranda Barbosa |
| DHI; 28 July 2024 | Brazil; Pomerode | 3 | Douglas Vieira | 3 | Nayara Bueno Cattoni |

=== Bulgaria ===
| Date | Venue | Podium (Men) | | Podium (Women) | |
|---|---|---|---|---|---|
| XCO; 20–21 July 2024 | Bulgaria; Sofia | 1 | Victor Enev | 1 | Hristina Kozareva |
| XCO; 20–21 July 2024 | Bulgaria; Sofia | 2 | Lachezar Angelov | 2 | Iveta Kostadinova |
| XCO; 20–21 July 2024 | Bulgaria; Sofia | 3 | Todor Angelov | 3 | Teodora Tabakova |

| Date | Venue | Podium (Men) | | Podium (Women) | |
|---|---|---|---|---|---|
| XCM; 13 July 2024 | Bulgaria; Sevlievo | 1 | Lachezar Angelov | 1 | Hristina Kozareva |
| XCM; 13 July 2024 | Bulgaria; Sevlievo | 2 | Bogdan Stoychev | 2 | Teodora Tabakova |
| XCM; 13 July 2024 | Bulgaria; Sevlievo | 3 | Martin Stefanov | 3 | Elena Gadeva |

| Date | Venue | Podium (Men) | | Podium (Women) | |
|---|---|---|---|---|---|
| DHI; 13–14 July 2024 | Bulgaria; Chepelare | 1 | Valentin Tenev | 1 | Denitsa Tosheva |
| DHI; 13–14 July 2024 | Bulgaria; Chepelare | 2 | Dimitar Mazneykov | 2 | Nelly Stoyanova |
| DHI; 13–14 July 2024 | Bulgaria; Chepelare | 3 | Stivian Gatev | 3 | Veneta Zaharieva |

| Date | Venue | Podium (Men) | | Podium (Women) | |
|---|---|---|---|---|---|
| END; 6–7 July 2024 | Bulgaria; Veliko Tarnovo | 1 | Stivian Gatev | 1 | Nelly Stoyanova |
| END; 6–7 July 2024 | Bulgaria; Veliko Tarnovo | 2 | Jordan Donev | 2 | Veneta Zaharieva |
| END; 6–7 July 2024 | Bulgaria; Veliko Tarnovo | 3 | Denislav Angelov | 3 | Stanimira Pesheva |

=== Canada ===
| Date | Venue | Podium (Men) | | Podium (Women) | |
|---|---|---|---|---|---|
| XCO; 20 July 2024 | Canada; Kentville | 1 | Léandre Bouchard | 1 | Jennifer Jackson |
| XCO; 20 July 2024 | Canada; Kentville | 2 | Carter Woods | 2 | Emilly Johnston |
| XCO; 20 July 2024 | Canada; Kentville | 3 | Logan Sadesky | 3 | Sandra Walter |

| Date | Venue | Podium (Men) | | Podium (Women) | |
|---|---|---|---|---|---|
| XCC; 18 July 2024 | Canada; Kentville | 1 | Cole Punchard | 1 | Jennifer Jackson |
| XCC; 18 July 2024 | Canada; Kentville | 2 | Carter Woods | 2 | Ava Holmgren |
| XCC; 18 July 2024 | Canada; Kentville | 3 | Léandre Bouchard | 3 | Maghalie Rochette |

=== China ===
| Date | Venue | Podium (Men) | | Podium (Women) | |
|---|---|---|---|---|---|
| XCO; 20–21 July 2024 | China; Nanjing | 1 | Mi Jiujiang | 1 | Wei Qianqian |
| XCO; 20–21 July 2024 | China; Nanjing | 2 | Gao Yongbing | 2 | Zhenglan Liang |
| XCO; 20–21 July 2024 | China; Nanjing | 3 | Xiao Huang | 3 | Wu Zhifan |

=== Chile ===
| Date | Venue | Podium (Men) | | Podium (Women) | |
|---|---|---|---|---|---|
| XCO; 15–17 March 2024 | Chile; Temuco | 1 | Martín Vidaurre | 1 | Catalina Vidaurre |
| XCO; 15–17 March 2024 | Chile; Temuco | 2 | Nicolás Delich Pardo | 2 | Yarela González |
| XCO; 15–17 March 2024 | Chile; Temuco | 3 | Patricio Farías | 3 | María Castro |

| Date | Venue | Podium (Men) | | Podium (Women) | |
|---|---|---|---|---|---|
| XCC; 15–17 March 2024 | Chile; Temuco | 1 | Martín Vidaurre | 1 | Catalina Vidaurre |
| XCC; 15–17 March 2024 | Chile; Temuco | 2 | Nicolás Delich Pardo | 2 | Yarela González |
| XCC; 15–17 March 2024 | Chile; Temuco | 3 | Patricio Farías | 3 | María Castro |

| Date | Venue | Podium (Men) | | Podium (Women) | |
|---|---|---|---|---|---|
| Downhill; 8–10 March 2024 | Chile; Santiago | 1 | Felipe Agurto | 1 | Fernanda Gildemeister |
| Downhill; 8–10 March 2024 | Chile; Santiago | 2 | Kristof Muller | 2 | Rafaela Madrid Piana |
| Downhill; 8–10 March 2024 | Chile; Santiago | 3 | Luciano Tarsetti | 3 | Paula Jara Bianchi |

=== Colombia ===
| Date | Venue | Podium (Men) | | Podium (Women) | |
|---|---|---|---|---|---|
| XCO; 18–21 July 2024 | Colombia; Ginebra | 1 | Jhonnatan Botero Villegas | 1 | Diana Pinilla |
| XCO; 18–21 July 2024 | Colombia; Ginebra | 2 | Juan Fernando Monroy | 2 | Ana Maria Roa |
| XCO; 18–21 July 2024 | Colombia; Ginebra | 3 | Ivan Felipe Lopez Castañeda | 3 | Gloria Garzón |

| Date | Venue | Podium (Men) | | Podium (Women) | |
|---|---|---|---|---|---|
| XCC; 18–21 July 2024 | Colombia; Ginebra | 1 | Jhonnatan Botero Villegas | 1 | Gloria Garzón |
| XCC; 18–21 July 2024 | Colombia; Ginebra | 2 | Ivan Felipe Lopez Castañeda | 2 | Ana Maria Roa |
| XCC; 18–21 July 2024 | Colombia; Ginebra | 3 | Nelson Duván Peña Franco | 3 | Diana Pinilla |

| Date | Venue | Podium (Men) | | Podium (Women) | |
|---|---|---|---|---|---|
| Downhill; 7–10 March 2024 | Colombia; Ginebra | 1 | Sebastián Holguín | 1 | Valentina Roa |
| Downhill; 7–10 March 2024 | Colombia; Ginebra | 2 | Juan Fernando Muñoz | 2 | Michel Berdugo |
| Downhill; 7–10 March 2024 | Colombia; Ginebra | 3 | Steven Ceballos | 3 | Erika Guerrero |

| Date | Venue | Podium (Men) | | Podium (Women) | |
|---|---|---|---|---|---|
| XCM; 7–10 March 2024 | Colombia; Ginebra | 1 | Wilson Rodriguez | 1 | Diana Pinilla |
| XCM; 7–10 March 2024 | Colombia; Ginebra | 2 | Juan Daniel Alarcón | 2 | Sofía Villegas |
| XCM; 7–10 March 2024 | Colombia; Ginebra | 3 | Carlos Alberto Gutiérrez | 3 | Laura Camila Cagua |

=== Costa Rica ===
| Date | Venue | Podium (Men) | | Podium (Women) | |
|---|---|---|---|---|---|
| XCO; 20–21 July 2024 | Costa Rica; San José | 1 | Joseph Ramirez Venegas | 1 | Adriana Rojas Cubero |
| XCO; 20–21 July 2024 | Costa Rica; San José | 2 | Paolo Montoya | 2 | Cristel Espinoza |
| XCO; 20–21 July 2024 | Costa Rica; San José | 3 | Jonathan Quesada Castillo | 3 | Glenda Madriz Sáenz |

| Date | Venue | Podium (Men) | | Podium (Women) | |
|---|---|---|---|---|---|
| XCC; 20–21 July 2024 | Costa Rica; San José | 1 | Jonathan Quesada Castillo | 1 | Adriana Rojas Cubero |
| XCC; 20–21 July 2024 | Costa Rica; San José | 2 | Federico Ramirez Flores | 2 | Cristel Espinoza |
| XCC; 20–21 July 2024 | Costa Rica; San José | 3 | Luis Aguilar Méndez | 3 | Glenda Madriz Sáenz |

| Date | Venue | Podium (Men) | | Podium (Women) | |
|---|---|---|---|---|---|
| XCE; 20–21 July 2024 | Costa Rica; San José | 1 | Steven Vargas Gomez | 1 | Glenda Madriz Sáenz |
| XCE; 20–21 July 2024 | Costa Rica; San José | 2 | Juan Diego Rojas Monge | 2 | Yailin Gómez |
| XCE; 20–21 July 2024 | Costa Rica; San José | 3 | Sebastián Brenes Mata | 3 | Isabel García Quirós |

| Date | Venue | Podium (Men) | | Podium (Women) | |
|---|---|---|---|---|---|
| XCM; 19 May 2024 | Costa Rica; Miramar District | 1 | Rodolfo Villalobos | 1 | Krissia Araya Vega |
| XCM; 19 May 2024 | Costa Rica; Miramar District | 2 | Carlos Herrera Arroyo | 2 | Natalia Navarro Cerdas |
| XCM; 19 May 2024 | Costa Rica; Miramar District | 3 | Paolo Montoya | 3 | Maria Zeledón Suarez |

| Date | Venue | Podium (Men) | | Podium (Women) | |
|---|---|---|---|---|---|
| E–XCM; 19 May 2024 | Costa Rica; Miramar District | 1 | Juan Daniel Herrera Campos | 1 | —N/a |
| E–XCM; 19 May 2024 | Costa Rica; Miramar District | 2 | Jose Antonio Meneses Jimenez | 2 | —N/a |
| E–XCM; 19 May 2024 | Costa Rica; Miramar District | 3 | —N/a | 3 | —N/a |

| Date | Venue | Podium (Men) | | Podium (Women) | |
|---|---|---|---|---|---|
| E-XC; 20–21 July 2024 | Costa Rica; San José | 1 | Aaron Guzmán | 1 | María José Segura |
| E-XC; 20–21 July 2024 | Costa Rica; San José | 2 | | 2 | |
| E-XC; 20–21 July 2024 | Costa Rica; San José | 3 | | 3 | |

| Date | Venue | Podium (Men) | | Podium (Women) | |
|---|---|---|---|---|---|
| END; 20–21 July 2024 | Costa Rica; Colón | 1 | —N/a | 1 | —N/a |
| END; 20–21 July 2024 | Costa Rica; Colón | 2 | —N/a | 2 | —N/a |
| END; 20–21 July 2024 | Costa Rica; Colón | 3 | —N/a | 3 | —N/a |

| Date | Venue | Podium (Men) | | Podium (Women) | |
|---|---|---|---|---|---|
| E-END; 20–21 July 2024 | Costa Rica; Colón | 1 | —N/a | 1 | —N/a |
| E-END; 20–21 July 2024 | Costa Rica; Colón | 2 | —N/a | 2 | —N/a |
| E-END; 20–21 July 2024 | Costa Rica; Colón | 3 | —N/a | 3 | —N/a |

=== Croatia ===
| Date | Venue | Podium (Men) | | Podium (Women) | |
|---|---|---|---|---|---|
| XCO; 21 July 2024 | Croatia; Žminj | 1 | Fran Bošnjak | 1 | Dora Čičin-Šain |
| XCO; 21 July 2024 | Croatia; Žminj | 2 | Ivan Okmažić | 2 | Ana Rumiha |
| XCO; 21 July 2024 | Croatia; Žminj | 3 | Ivan Sakoman | 3 | Valentina Pilčić |

=== Cyprus ===
| Date | Venue | Podium (Men) | | Podium (Women) | |
|---|---|---|---|---|---|
| XCO; 7 July 2024 | Cyprus; Troodos Mountains | 1 | Andreas Miltiadis | 1 | Ekaterina Kovalchuk |
| XCO; 7 July 2024 | Cyprus; Troodos Mountains | 2 | Christodoulos Achas | 2 | Constantina Georgiou |
| XCO; 7 July 2024 | Cyprus; Troodos Mountains | 3 | Georgios Kouzis | 3 | Styliana Kamilari |

=== Czechia ===
| Date | Venue | Podium (Men) | | Podium (Women) | |
|---|---|---|---|---|---|
| XCO; 20–21 July 2024 | Czech Republic; Harrachov | 1 | Ondřej Cink | 1 | Jitka Čábelická |
| XCO; 20–21 July 2024 | Czech Republic; Harrachov | 2 | Jan Sáska | 2 | Patricie Srnská |
| XCO; 20–21 July 2024 | Czech Republic; Harrachov | 3 | Marek Rauchfuss | 3 | Simona Spěšná |

| Date | Venue | Podium (Men) | | Podium (Women) | |
|---|---|---|---|---|---|
| Downhill; 2 June 2024 | Czech Republic; Liberec | 1 | Stanislav Sehnal | 1 | Kristýna Havlická |
| Downhill; 2 June 2024 | Czech Republic; Liberec | 2 | Matěj Charvát | 2 | Karolína Kadlecová |
| Downhill; 2 June 2024 | Czech Republic; Liberec | 3 | Jan Čepelák | 3 | Natálie Volejníková |

| Date | Venue | Podium (Men) | | Podium (Women) | |
|---|---|---|---|---|---|
| END; 19–21 July 2024 | Czech Republic; Kouty nad Desnou | 1 | Matěj Charvát | 1 | Kristýna Havlická |
| END; 19–21 July 2024 | Czech Republic; Kouty nad Desnou | 2 | Antonín Král | 2 | Sabina Košárková |
| END; 19–21 July 2024 | Czech Republic; Kouty nad Desnou | 3 | Stanislav Sehnal | 3 | Štěpánka Nestlerová |

| Date | Venue | Podium (Men) | | Podium (Women) |
|---|---|---|---|---|
| E-END; 19–21 July 2024 | Czech Republic; Kouty nad Desnou | 1 | Milan Myšík | 1 |
| E-END; 19–21 July 2024 | Czech Republic; Kouty nad Desnou | 2 | Vojtěch Moudrý | 2 |
| E-END; 19–21 July 2024 | Czech Republic; Kouty nad Desnou | 3 | Michal Prokop | 3 |

=== Denmark ===
| Date | Venue | Podium (Men) | | Podium (Women) | |
|---|---|---|---|---|---|
| XCO; 9 June 2024 | Denmark; Roskilde | 1 | Sebastian Fini Carstensen | 1 | Sofie Heby Pedersen |
| XCO; 9 June 2024 | Denmark; Roskilde | 2 | Tobias Lillelund | 2 | Caroline Bohé |
| XCO; 9 June 2024 | Denmark; Roskilde | 3 | Oliver Vedersø Sølvhøj | 3 | Malene Degn |

| Date | Venue | Podium (Men) | | Podium (Women) | |
|---|---|---|---|---|---|
| XCC; 8 June 2024 | Denmark; Roskilde | 1 | Sebastian Fini Carstensen | 1 | Sofie Heby Pedersen |
| XCC; 8 June 2024 | Denmark; Roskilde | 2 | Tobias Lillelund | 2 | Caroline Bohé |
| XCC; 8 June 2024 | Denmark; Roskilde | 3 | Oliver Vedersø Sølvhøj | 3 | Julie Lillelund |

=== Dominican Republic ===
| Date | Venue | Podium (Men) | | Podium (Women) | |
|---|---|---|---|---|---|
| XCO; 20–21 July 2024 | Dominican Republic; Santiago de los Caballeros | 1 | Jeudy Liranzo | 1 | Gabriella Tejada |
| XCO; 20–21 July 2024 | Dominican Republic; Santiago de los Caballeros | 2 | Joel García Peña | 2 | Smarlin Coronado |
| XCO; 20–21 July 2024 | Dominican Republic; Santiago de los Caballeros | 3 | Leonel Veras Rivera | 3 | |

| Date | Venue | Podium (Men) | | Podium (Women) | |
|---|---|---|---|---|---|
| XCC; 20–21 July 2024 | Dominican Republic; Santiago de los Caballeros | 1 | Joel García Peña | 1 | Gabriella Tejada |
| XCC; 20–21 July 2024 | Dominican Republic; Santiago de los Caballeros | 2 | Jeudy Liranzo | 2 | Smarlin Coronado |
| XCC; 20–21 July 2024 | Dominican Republic; Santiago de los Caballeros | 3 | Alex Muñoz Feliz | 3 | |

| Date | Venue | Podium (Men) | Podium (Women) |
|---|---|---|---|
| XCE; 20–21 July 2024 | Dominican Republic; Santiago de los Caballeros | 1 | 1 |
| XCE; 20–21 July 2024 | Dominican Republic; Santiago de los Caballeros | 2 | 2 |
| XCE; 20–21 July 2024 | Dominican Republic; Santiago de los Caballeros | 3 | 3 |

=== Ecuador ===
| Date | Venue | Podium (Men) | | Podium (Women) | |
|---|---|---|---|---|---|
| XCO; 18–21 July 2024 | Ecuador; Loja | 1 | Juan Carlos Córdova | 1 | Mikela Molina |
| XCO; 18–21 July 2024 | Ecuador; Loja | 2 | William Tobay Mogrovejo | 2 | Daniela Machuca |
| XCO; 18–21 July 2024 | Ecuador; Loja | 3 | | 3 | Gabriela Loaiza |

| Date | Venue | Podium (Men) | | Podium (Women) | |
|---|---|---|---|---|---|
| XCC; 18–21 July 2024 | Ecuador; Loja | 1 | William Tobay Mogrovejo | 1 | Mikela Molina |
| XCC; 18–21 July 2024 | Ecuador; Loja | 2 | Juan Carlos Córdova | 2 | Daniela Machuca |
| XCC; 18–21 July 2024 | Ecuador; Loja | 3 | Juan Banegas Arias | 3 | Gabriela Loaiza |

| Date | Venue | Podium (Men) | | Podium (Women) |
|---|---|---|---|---|
| XCE; 18–21 July 2024 | Ecuador; Loja | 1 | Erick Fierro Proaño | 1 |
| XCE; 18–21 July 2024 | Ecuador; Loja | 2 | Martín Cruz Burbano | 2 |
| XCE; 18–21 July 2024 | Ecuador; Loja | 3 | Bryam Bermeo | 3 |

| Date | Venue | Podium (Men) | | Podium (Women) | |
|---|---|---|---|---|---|
| XCM; 22–23 June 2024 | Ecuador; Cotopaxi | 1 | William Tobay Mogrovejo | 1 | Ana Isabel Idrovo |
| XCM; 22–23 June 2024 | Ecuador; Cotopaxi | 2 | Willman Avila | 2 | Daniela Zambrano Estupiñán |
| XCM; 22–23 June 2024 | Ecuador; Cotopaxi | 3 | Alejandro Armando Machuca Machuca | 3 | |

=== El Salvador ===
| Date | Venue | Podium (Men) | | Podium (Women) | |
|---|---|---|---|---|---|
| XCO; 20–21 July 2024 | El Salvador; La Libertad | 1 | Fernando Escobar Medina | 1 | Xenia Estrada |
| XCO; 20–21 July 2024 | El Salvador; La Libertad | 2 | | 2 | |
| XCO; 20–21 July 2024 | El Salvador; La Libertad | 3 | | 3 | |

| Date | Venue | Podium (Men) | Podium (Women) |
|---|---|---|---|
| XCC; 20–21 July 2024 | El Salvador; La Libertad | 1 | 1 |
| XCC; 20–21 July 2024 | El Salvador; La Libertad | 2 | 2 |
| XCC; 20–21 July 2024 | El Salvador; La Libertad | 3 | 3 |

| Date | Venue | Podium (Men) | | Podium (Women) |
|---|---|---|---|---|
| DHI; 7 July 2024 | El Salvador; La Libertad | 1 | Manuel Castellanos | 1 |
| DHI; 7 July 2024 | El Salvador; La Libertad | 2 | Jorge Murcia | 2 |
| DHI; 7 July 2024 | El Salvador; La Libertad | 3 | José Mauricio Peña | 3 |

=== Estonia ===
| Date | Venue | Podium (Men) | | Podium (Women) | |
|---|---|---|---|---|---|
| XCO; 18–20 July 2024 | Estonia; Mägede | 1 | Markus Pajur | 1 | Janika Lõiv |
| XCO; 18–20 July 2024 | Estonia; Mägede | 2 | Josten Vaidem | 2 | Merili Sirvel |
| XCO; 18–20 July 2024 | Estonia; Mägede | 3 | Peeter Tarvis | 3 | Mari-Liis Mõttus |

| Date | Venue | Podium (Men) | | Podium (Women) | |
|---|---|---|---|---|---|
| XCC; 18–20 July 2024 | Estonia; Mägede | 1 | Markus Pajur | 1 | Janika Lõiv |
| XCC; 18–20 July 2024 | Estonia; Mägede | 2 | Kirill Tarassov | 2 | Merili Sirvel |
| XCC; 18–20 July 2024 | Estonia; Mägede | 3 | Josten Vaidem | 3 | Mari-Liis Mõttus |

| Date | Venue | Podium (Men) | | Podium (Women) | |
|---|---|---|---|---|---|
| XCE; 18–20 July 2024 | Estonia; Mägede | 1 | Kirill Tarassov | 1 | Merili Sirvel |
| XCE; 18–20 July 2024 | Estonia; Mägede | 2 | Markus Pajur | 2 | Mari-Liis Mõttus |
| XCE; 18–20 July 2024 | Estonia; Mägede | 3 | Joosep Mesi | 3 | Maribel Rannala |

=== Estonia ===
| Date | Venue | Podium (Men) | | Podium (Women) | |
|---|---|---|---|---|---|
| DHI; 15–16 June 2024 | Estonia; Kiviõli | 1 | Armin Pilv | 1 | Katarina Väljakol |
| DHI; 15–16 June 2024 | Estonia; Kiviõli | 2 | Robert Johanson | 2 | Jana Ivahnenko |
| DHI; 15–16 June 2024 | Estonia; Kiviõli | 3 | Hendrik Kirsipuu | 3 | Kätlin Räpo |

=== Finland ===
| Date | Venue | Podium (Men) | | Podium (Women) | |
|---|---|---|---|---|---|
| XCO; 20–21 July 2024 | Finland; Valkeakoski | 1 | Aksel Rantanen | 1 | Sini Alusniemi |
| XCO; 20–21 July 2024 | Finland; Valkeakoski | 2 | Ville Tuppurainen | 2 | Noora Kanerva |
| XCO; 20–21 July 2024 | Finland; Valkeakoski | 3 | Sakari Lehtinen | 3 | Hanna Häkkinen |

| Date | Venue | Podium (Men) | | Podium (Women) | |
|---|---|---|---|---|---|
| XCC; 20–21 July 2024 | Finland; Valkeakoski | 1 | Aksel Rantanen | 1 | Henna-Mari Havana |
| XCC; 20–21 July 2024 | Finland; Valkeakoski | 2 | Mikhail Utkin | 2 | Ruska Saarela |
| XCC; 20–21 July 2024 | Finland; Valkeakoski | 3 | Ville Tuppurainen | 3 | Astrid Snäll |

| Date | Venue | Podium (Men) | | Podium (Women) | |
|---|---|---|---|---|---|
| XCM; 6 July 2024 | Finland; Nilsiä | 1 | Toni Tähti | 1 | Sini Alusniemi |
| XCM; 6 July 2024 | Finland; Nilsiä | 2 | Joni Savaste | 2 | Noora Kanerva |
| XCM; 6 July 2024 | Finland; Nilsiä | 3 | Aksel Rantanen | 3 | Hanna Häkkinen |

| Date | Venue | Podium (Men) | | Podium (Women) | |
|---|---|---|---|---|---|
| END; 15–16 June 2024 | Finland; Pudasjärvi | 1 | Tarmo Ryynänen | 1 | Suvi Vacker |
| END; 15–16 June 2024 | Finland; Pudasjärvi | 2 | Petteri Leivo | 2 | Anna Ruokoja |
| END; 15–16 June 2024 | Finland; Pudasjärvi | 3 | Erik Väänänen | 3 | Heidi Saarinen |

| Date | Venue | Podium (Men) | Podium (Women) |
|---|---|---|---|
| DHI; 20–21 July 2024 | Finland; Porvoo | 1 | 1 |
| DHI; 20–21 July 2024 | Finland; Porvoo | 2 | 2 |
| DHI; 20–21 July 2024 | Finland; Porvoo | 3 | 3 |

=== France ===
| Date | Venue | Podium (Men) | | Podium (Women) | |
|---|---|---|---|---|---|
| XCO; 4 May 2024 | France; Levens | 1 | Jordan Sarrou | 1 | Loana Lecomte |
| XCO; 4 May 2024 | France; Levens | 2 | Thomas Griot | 2 | Olivia Onesti |
| XCO; 4 May 2024 | France; Levens | 3 | Titouan Carod | 3 | Flavie Guille |

| Date | Venue | Podium (Men) | | Podium (Women) | |
|---|---|---|---|---|---|
| XCC; 3 May 2024 | France; Levens | 1 | Mathis Azzaro | 1 | Loana Lecomte |
| XCC; 3 May 2024 | France; Levens | 2 | Thomas Griot | 2 | Flavie Guille |
| XCC; 3 May 2024 | France; Levens | 3 | Maxime Loret | 3 | Léna Gérault |

| Date | Venue | Podium (Men) | | Podium (Women) | |
|---|---|---|---|---|---|
| XCE; 2 May 2024 | France; Levens | 1 | Titouan Perrin-Ganier | 1 | Margaux Borrelly |
| XCE; 2 May 2024 | France; Levens | 2 | Lorenzo Serres | 2 | Maëlle Loiseau |
| XCE; 2 May 2024 | France; Levens | 3 | Justin Wal | 3 | Amandine Vidon |

| Date | Venue | Podium (Men) | | Podium (Women) | |
|---|---|---|---|---|---|
| XCM; 22 June 2024 | France; Puy-Saint-Vincent | 1 | Hugo Drechou | 1 | Margot Moschetti |
| XCM; 22 June 2024 | France; Puy-Saint-Vincent | 2 | Axel Roudil-Cortinat | 2 | Juliette Trombini |
| XCM; 22 June 2024 | France; Puy-Saint-Vincent | 3 | Pierre Billaud | 3 | Marion Bessone |

| Date | Venue | Podium (Men) | | Podium (Women) | |
|---|---|---|---|---|---|
| E-XC; 12–14 July 2024 | France; Puy-Saint-Vincent | 1 | Jérôme Gilloux | 1 | Justine Tonso |
| E-XC; 12–14 July 2024 | France; Puy-Saint-Vincent | 2 | Theo Summo | 2 | Estelle Petithory |
| E-XC; 12–14 July 2024 | France; Puy-Saint-Vincent | 3 | Gabriel Eustache | 3 | Solène Bouissou |

| Date | Venue | Podium (Men) | | Podium (Women) | |
|---|---|---|---|---|---|
| EDR; 24–26 May 2024 | France; Brassac | 1 | Alex Rudeau | 1 | Isabeau Courdurier |
| EDR; 24–26 May 2024 | France; Brassac | 2 | Louis Jeandel | 2 | Mélanie Pugin |
| EDR; 24–26 May 2024 | France; Brassac | 3 | Dylan Levesque | 3 | Morgane Charre |

| Date | Venue | Podium (Men) | | Podium (Women) | |
|---|---|---|---|---|---|
| E–EDR; 24–26 May 2024 | France; Brassac | 1 | Céccé Camoin | 1 | Laura Charles |
| E–EDR; 24–26 May 2024 | France; Brassac | 2 | Kévin Marry | 2 | Justine Henry |
| E–EDR; 24–26 May 2024 | France; Brassac | 3 | Antoine Rogge | 3 | Maëlle Escudero |

| Date | Venue | Podium (Men) | | Podium (Women) | |
|---|---|---|---|---|---|
| Snow Bike; 3–4 February 2024 | France; Les Gets | 1 | Pierre Thevenard | 1 | Morgane Charre |
| Snow Bike; 3–4 February 2024 | France; Les Gets | 2 | Dylan Levesque | 2 | Sabrina Jonnier |
| Snow Bike; 3–4 February 2024 | France; Les Gets | 3 | Vincent Tupin | 3 | Sylvie Taberlet |

=== Georgia ===
| Date | Venue | Podium (Men) | | Podium (Women) |
|---|---|---|---|---|
| XCO; 23–24 July 2024 | Georgia; Tbilisi | 1 | Giorgi Rokva | 1 |
| XCO; 23–24 July 2024 | Georgia; Tbilisi | 2 | Giorgi Suvadzoglu | 2 |
| XCO; 23–24 July 2024 | Georgia; Tbilisi | 3 | Avtandil Piranishvili | 3 |

=== Germany ===
| Date | Venue | Podium (Men) | | Podium (Women) | |
|---|---|---|---|---|---|
| XCO; 12–14 July 2024 | Germany; Obergessertshausen | 1 | Luca Schwarzbauer | 1 | Lia Schrievers |
| XCO; 12–14 July 2024 | Germany; Obergessertshausen | 2 | David List | 2 | Ronja Eibl |
| XCO; 12–14 July 2024 | Germany; Obergessertshausen | 3 | Maximilian Brandl | 3 | Nina Graf |

| Date | Venue | Podium (Men) | | Podium (Women) | |
|---|---|---|---|---|---|
| XCC; 12–14 July 2024 | Germany; Obergessertshausen | 1 | Leon Kaiser | 1 | Lia Schrievers |
| XCC; 12–14 July 2024 | Germany; Obergessertshausen | 2 | David List | 2 | Kira Böhm |
| XCC; 12–14 July 2024 | Germany; Obergessertshausen | 3 | Maximilian Brandl | 3 | Ronja Eibl |

| Date | Venue | Podium (Men) | | Podium (Women) | |
|---|---|---|---|---|---|
| XCE; 22 June 2024 | Germany; Ravensburg | 1 | Louis Krauss | 1 | Marion Fromberger |
| XCE; 22 June 2024 | Germany; Ravensburg | 2 | Felix Klausmann | 2 | Jana Lohrmann |
| XCE; 22 June 2024 | Germany; Ravensburg | 3 | Nils-Obed Riecker | 3 | Antonia Daubermann |

=== Great Britain ===
| Date | Venue | Podium (Men) | | Podium (Women) | |
|---|---|---|---|---|---|
| XCO; 19–21 July 2024 | United Kingdom; Dalby Forest | 1 | Cameron Orr | 1 | Annie Last |
| XCO; 19–21 July 2024 | United Kingdom; Dalby Forest | 2 | Thomas Mein | 2 | Grace Inglis |
| XCO; 19–21 July 2024 | United Kingdom; Dalby Forest | 3 | Ben Wadey | 3 | Amy Henchoz |

| Date | Venue | Podium (Men) | | Podium (Women) | |
|---|---|---|---|---|---|
| XCC; 19–21 July 2024 | United Kingdom; Dalby Forest | 1 | Max Greensill | 1 | Annie Last |
| XCC; 19–21 July 2024 | United Kingdom; Dalby Forest | 2 | Cameron Orr | 2 | Anna Flynn |
| XCC; 19–21 July 2024 | United Kingdom; Dalby Forest | 3 | Thomas Mein | 3 | Grace Inglis |

| Date | Venue | Podium (Men) | | Podium (Women) | |
|---|---|---|---|---|---|
| DHI; 20–21 July 2024 | United Kingdom; Rhydyfelin | 1 | Matt Walker | 1 | Harriet Harnden |
| DHI; 20–21 July 2024 | United Kingdom; Rhydyfelin | 2 | Charlie Hatton | 2 | Mikayla Parton |
| DHI; 20–21 July 2024 | United Kingdom; Rhydyfelin | 3 | Joe Breeden | 3 | Louise-Anna Ferguson |

=== Greece ===
| Date | Venue | Podium (Men) | | Podium (Women) | |
|---|---|---|---|---|---|
| XCO; 19–21 July 2024 | Greece; Karpenisi | 1 | Periklis Ilias | 1 | Eleftheria Giachou |
| XCO; 19–21 July 2024 | Greece; Karpenisi | 2 | Alexandros Athanasiadis | 2 | Varvara Fasoi |
| XCO; 19–21 July 2024 | Greece; Karpenisi | 3 | Charoun Molla | 3 | Athina Tzoulaki |

| Date | Venue | Podium (Men) | | Podium (Women) | |
|---|---|---|---|---|---|
| XCC; 19–21 July 2024 | Greece; Karpenisi | 1 | Alexandros Athanasiadis | 1 | Eleftheria Giachou |
| XCC; 19–21 July 2024 | Greece; Karpenisi | 2 | Charoun Molla | 2 | Varvara Fasoi |
| XCC; 19–21 July 2024 | Greece; Karpenisi | 3 | Nikolaos Georgiadis | 3 | Athina Tzoulaki |

| Date | Venue | Podium (Men) | | Podium (Women) | |
|---|---|---|---|---|---|
| E-MTB; 19–21 July 2024 | Greece; Karpenisi | 1 | Theodoros Petridis | 1 | Varvara Fasoi |
| E-MTB; 19–21 July 2024 | Greece; Karpenisi | 2 | Charoun Molla | 2 | Aikaterini Eleftheriadou |
| E-MTB; 19–21 July 2024 | Greece; Karpenisi | 3 | Petros Rassos | 3 | |

| Date | Venue | Podium (Men) | | Podium (Women) | |
|---|---|---|---|---|---|
| XCE; 23 June 2024 | Greece; Karpenisi | 1 | Andreas Stamatopoulos | 1 | Eleftheria Giachou |
| XCE; 23 June 2024 | Greece; Karpenisi | 2 | Dimitrios Katsikas | 2 | Evangelia Ntakou |
| XCE; 23 June 2024 | Greece; Karpenisi | 3 | Alexandros Karousos | 3 | Athina Tzoulaki |

| Date | Venue | Podium (Men) | | Podium (Women) | |
|---|---|---|---|---|---|
| XCM; 25–26 May 2024 | Greece; Mount Oeta | 1 | Periklis Ilias | 1 | Eleftheria Giachou |
| XCM; 25–26 May 2024 | Greece; Mount Oeta | 2 | Alexandros Athanasiadis | 2 | Eirini Maria Karousou |
| XCM; 25–26 May 2024 | Greece; Mount Oeta | 3 | Georgios Glavinas | 3 | Alexandra Adam |

| Date | Venue | Podium (Men) | | Podium (Women) | |
|---|---|---|---|---|---|
| END; 6–7 July 2024 | Greece; Ioannina | 1 | Giorgos Agiomavritis | 1 | — |
| END; 6–7 July 2024 | Greece; Ioannina | 2 | Grigorios Tsalafoutas | 2 | — |
| END; 6–7 July 2024 | Greece; Ioannina | 3 | Petros Afendras | 3 | — |

=== Guam ===
| Date | Venue | Podium (Men) | | Podium (Women) | |
|---|---|---|---|---|---|
| XCO; 3 March 2024 | Guam; Piti | 1 | Edward Oingerang | 1 | Jennifer Camacho |
| XCO; 3 March 2024 | Guam; Piti | 2 | Brian Cabaccang | 2 | Tara Tydingco |
| XCO; 3 March 2024 | Guam; Piti | 3 | Derek Horton | 3 | |

=== Guatemala ===
| Date | Venue | Podium (Men) | | Podium (Women) | |
|---|---|---|---|---|---|
| XCO; 26 May 2024 | Guatemala; Tecpán | 1 | Julio Ispaché | 1 | Mary Daggett |
| XCO; 26 May 2024 | Guatemala; Tecpán | 2 | Gabriel Sáenz | 2 | María Alvarado |
| XCO; 26 May 2024 | Guatemala; Tecpán | 3 | Esdras Morales | 3 | Fátima Cristales |

=== Honduras ===
| Date | Venue | Podium (Men) | | Podium (Women) | |
|---|---|---|---|---|---|
| XCO; 20–21 July 2024 | Honduras; Tegucigalpa | 1 | Luis López | 1 | Ninoska Andino Portillo |
| XCO; 20–21 July 2024 | Honduras; Tegucigalpa | 2 | Cristhian Triminio Martínez | 2 | Karen Canales Euceda |
| XCO; 20–21 July 2024 | Honduras; Tegucigalpa | 3 | Bryan Cárcamo Mairena | 3 | Xenia Molina Mejia |

| Date | Venue | Podium (Men) | | Podium (Women) | |
|---|---|---|---|---|---|
| XCC; 20–21 July 2024 | Honduras; Tegucigalpa | 1 | Luis López | 1 | Ninoska Andino Portillo |
| XCC; 20–21 July 2024 | Honduras; Tegucigalpa | 2 | Bryan Cárcamo Mairena | 2 | Xenia Molina Mejia |
| XCC; 20–21 July 2024 | Honduras; Tegucigalpa | 3 | Cristhian Triminio Martínez | 3 | Karen Elisa Amaya |

| Date | Venue | Podium (Men) | | Podium (Women) |
|---|---|---|---|---|
| XCE; 20–21 July 2024 | Honduras; Tegucigalpa | 1 | Cristhian Triminio Martínez | 1 |
| XCE; 20–21 July 2024 | Honduras; Tegucigalpa | 2 | Luis López | 2 |
| XCE; 20–21 July 2024 | Honduras; Tegucigalpa | 3 | Carlos Ochoa | 3 |

| Date | Venue | Podium (Men) | | Podium (Women) | |
|---|---|---|---|---|---|
| DHI; 16 June 2024 | Honduras; La Ceiba | 1 | Ángel Bonilla | 1 | María José Montoya |
| DHI; 16 June 2024 | Honduras; La Ceiba | 2 | Brayan Aguilar | 2 | Ana Montoya |
| DHI; 16 June 2024 | Honduras; La Ceiba | 3 | Donato Varela | 3 | Rossy Sevilla |

=== Hungary ===
| Date | Venue | Podium (Men) | | Podium (Women) | |
|---|---|---|---|---|---|
| XCO; 19–21 July 2024 | Hungary; Zalaegerszeg | 1 | Zsombor Palumby | 1 | Virág Buzsáki |
| XCO; 19–21 July 2024 | Hungary; Zalaegerszeg | 2 | András Parti | 2 | Szonja Greman |
| XCO; 19–21 July 2024 | Hungary; Zalaegerszeg | 3 | Máté Endrédi | 3 | Csenge Anna Bokros |

| Date | Venue | Podium (Men) | | Podium (Women) | |
|---|---|---|---|---|---|
| XCC; 19–21 July 2024 | Hungary; Zalaegerszeg | 1 | Zsombor Palumby | 1 | Virág Buzsáki |
| XCC; 19–21 July 2024 | Hungary; Zalaegerszeg | 2 | Balázs Sylvester | 2 | Csenge Anna Bokros |
| XCC; 19–21 July 2024 | Hungary; Zalaegerszeg | 3 | Áron Mihály Horváth | 3 | Szonja Greman |

| Date | Venue | Podium (Men) | | Podium (Women) | |
|---|---|---|---|---|---|
| XCM; 15 June 2024 | Hungary; Nagykovácsi | 1 | Zsombor Palumby | 1 | Szonja Greman |
| XCM; 15 June 2024 | Hungary; Nagykovácsi | 2 | András Szatmáry | 2 | Viktória Szekeres |
| XCM; 15 June 2024 | Hungary; Nagykovácsi | 3 | Benedek Borsos | 3 | Lilla Zsidai |

=== Indonesia ===
| Date | Venue | Podium (Men) | | Podium (Women) | |
|---|---|---|---|---|---|
| XCO; 18–21 July 2024 | Indonesia; Yogyakarta | 1 | Zaenal Fanani | 1 | Sayu Bella Sukma Dewi |
| XCO; 18–21 July 2024 | Indonesia; Yogyakarta | 2 | Feri Yudoyono | 2 | Novia Dwi Safitri |
| XCO; 18–21 July 2024 | Indonesia; Yogyakarta | 3 | Ihza Muhammad | 3 | Sofi Intan Fajrianti |

| Date | Venue | Podium (Men) | | Podium (Women) | |
|---|---|---|---|---|---|
| XCC; 18–21 July 2024 | Indonesia; Yogyakarta | 1 | Muhammad Fachri Naufal Barokah | 1 | Dwi Safitri |
| XCC; 18–21 July 2024 | Indonesia; Yogyakarta | 2 | Teguh Priyadi | 2 | Romi Veldnizki |
| XCC; 18–21 July 2024 | Indonesia; Yogyakarta | 3 | Dimas Pratama | 3 | Nadha Zulma Trinovia |

| Date | Venue | Podium (Men) | | Podium (Women) | |
|---|---|---|---|---|---|
| XCE; 18–21 July 2024 | Indonesia; Yogyakarta | 1 | Renoza Aldi Pratama | 1 | Milatul Khaqimah |
| XCE; 18–21 July 2024 | Indonesia; Yogyakarta | 2 | Ihza Muhammad | 2 | Dela Anjar Wulan |
| XCE; 18–21 July 2024 | Indonesia; Yogyakarta | 3 | Muhammad Hafizh | 3 | Salma Putri |

| Date | Venue | Podium (Men) | | Podium (Women) | |
|---|---|---|---|---|---|
| END; 18–21 July 2024 | Indonesia; Yogyakarta | 1 | Pahraz Salman Al Parisi | 1 | Riska Amelia Agustina |
| END; 18–21 July 2024 | Indonesia; Yogyakarta | 2 | Hildan Afosma Katana | 2 | Nilna Murni Ningtias |
| END; 18–21 July 2024 | Indonesia; Yogyakarta | 3 | Ficco Nurdiansyah | 3 | |

| Date | Venue | Podium (Men) | | Podium (Women) | |
|---|---|---|---|---|---|
| DHI; 18–21 July 2024 | Indonesia; Yogyakarta | 1 | Mohammad Abdul Hakim | 1 | Riska Amelia Agustina |
| DHI; 18–21 July 2024 | Indonesia; Yogyakarta | 2 | Andy Prayoga | 2 | Milatul Khaqimah |
| DHI; 18–21 July 2024 | Indonesia; Yogyakarta | 3 | Rendy Varera Sanjaya | 3 | Ayu Triya Andriana |

=== Ireland ===
| Date | Venue | Podium (Men) | | Podium (Women) | |
|---|---|---|---|---|---|
| XCO; 20–21 July 2024 | Ireland | 1 | Christopher Dawson | 1 | Greta Lawless |
| XCO; 20–21 July 2024 | Ireland | 2 | Dean Harvey | 2 | Caoimhe May |
| XCO; 20–21 July 2024 | Ireland | 3 | David Montgomery | 3 | Faith Robinson |

| Date | Venue | Podium (Men) | | Podium (Women) | |
|---|---|---|---|---|---|
| DHI; 20–21 July 2024 | Ireland | 1 | Oisín O'Callaghan | 1 | Leah Maunsell |
| DHI; 20–21 July 2024 | Ireland | 2 | Jacob Dickson | 2 | Hannah Mullin |
| DHI; 20–21 July 2024 | Ireland | 3 | Christopher Cumming | 3 | Chloe Traynor |

=== Israel ===
| Date | Venue | Podium (Men) | | Podium (Women) | |
|---|---|---|---|---|---|
| XCO; 11 June 2024 | Israel; Mishmar HaEmek | 1 | Tomer Zaltsman | 1 | Na'ama Noyman |
| XCO; 11 June 2024 | Israel; Mishmar HaEmek | 2 | Gil Ly Gonen | 2 | Zohar Bar Joseph |
| XCO; 11 June 2024 | Israel; Mishmar HaEmek | 3 | Nir Tchwella | 3 | Romi Veldnizki |

| Date | Venue | Podium (Men) | | Podium (Women) | |
|---|---|---|---|---|---|
| XCC; 17 May 2024 | Israel; Kule | 1 | Gil Ly Gonen | 1 | Zohar Bar Joseph |
| XCC; 17 May 2024 | Israel; Kule | 2 | Tomer Caspi | 2 | Romi Veldnizki |
| XCC; 17 May 2024 | Israel; Kule | 3 | Nir Tchwella | 3 | Daniel Figer |

| Date | Venue | Podium (Men) | | Podium (Women) | |
|---|---|---|---|---|---|
| XCM; 4 May 2024 | Israel; Ramot Menashe | 1 | Tomer Zaltsman | 1 | Deborah Ohayon |
| XCM; 4 May 2024 | Israel; Ramot Menashe | 2 | Yuval Ben Moshe | 2 | Zohar Bar Joseph |
| XCM; 4 May 2024 | Israel; Ramot Menashe | 3 | Jonathan Baron | 3 | Romi Veldnizki |

| Date | Venue | Podium (Men) | | Podium (Women) | |
|---|---|---|---|---|---|
| Enduro; 23 March 2024 | Israel; Northern District | 1 | Yonatan Yatom | 1 | Noga Korem |
| Enduro; 23 March 2024 | Israel; Northern District | 2 | Yuval Nir | 2 | Sahar Michal Reis |
| Enduro; 23 March 2024 | Israel; Northern District | 3 | Ohad Hezazi Garesh | 3 | |

=== Italy ===
| Date | Venue | Podium (Men) | | Podium (Women) | |
|---|---|---|---|---|---|
| XCO; 20–21 July 2024 | Italy; Pergine Valsugana | 1 | Luca Braidot | 1 | Martina Berta |
| XCO; 20–21 July 2024 | Italy; Pergine Valsugana | 2 | Simone Avondetto | 2 | Giada Specia |
| XCO; 20–21 July 2024 | Italy; Pergine Valsugana | 3 | Juri Zanotti | 3 | Greta Seiwald |

| Date | Venue | Podium (Men) | | Podium (Women) | |
|---|---|---|---|---|---|
| E-MTB XC; 20–21 July 2024 | Italy; Pergine Valsugana | 1 | Mirko Tabacchi | 1 | Anna Oberparleiter |
| E-MTB XC; 20–21 July 2024 | Italy; Pergine Valsugana | 2 | Tommaso Bianchetti | 2 | Katia Moro |
| E-MTB XC; 20–21 July 2024 | Italy; Pergine Valsugana | 3 | Martino Fruet | 3 | Camilla Martinet |

| Date | Venue | Podium (Men) | | Podium (Women) | |
|---|---|---|---|---|---|
| XCC; 3 May 2024 | Italy; Nervesa della Battaglia | 1 | Simone Avondetto | 1 | Giada Specia |
| XCC; 3 May 2024 | Italy; Nervesa della Battaglia | 2 | Gioele Bertolini | 2 | Chiara Teocchi |
| XCC; 3 May 2024 | Italy; Nervesa della Battaglia | 3 | Nadir Colledani | 3 | Martina Berta |

| Date | Venue | Podium (Men) | | Podium (Women) | |
|---|---|---|---|---|---|
| XCM; 2 June 2024 | Italy; Letojanni | 1 | Fabian Rabensteiner | 1 | Claudia Peretti |
| XCM; 2 June 2024 | Italy; Letojanni | 2 | Gioele De Cosmo | 2 | Sandra Mairhofer |
| XCM; 2 June 2024 | Italy; Letojanni | 3 | Samuele Porro | 3 | Mara Fumagalli |

| Date | Venue | Podium (Men) | | Podium (Women) | |
|---|---|---|---|---|---|
| DHI; 20–21 July 2024 | Italy; Cortina d'Ampezzo | 1 | Davide Palazzari | 1 | Gloria Scarsi |
| DHI; 20–21 July 2024 | Italy; Cortina d'Ampezzo | 2 | Stefano Introzzi | 2 | Eleonora Farina |
| DHI; 20–21 July 2024 | Italy; Cortina d'Ampezzo | 3 | Loris Revelli | 3 | Veronika Widmann |

=== Japan ===
| Date | Venue | Podium (Men) | | Podium (Women) | |
|---|---|---|---|---|---|
| XCO; 6–7 July 2024 | Japan; Nagano Prefecture | 1 | Toki Sawada | 1 | Akari Kobayashi |
| XCO; 6–7 July 2024 | Japan; Nagano Prefecture | 2 | Ari Hirabayashi | 2 | Urara Kawaguchi |
| XCO; 6–7 July 2024 | Japan; Nagano Prefecture | 3 | Asahi Miyazu | 3 | Maiha Takemura |

| Date | Venue | Podium (Men) | | Podium (Women) | |
|---|---|---|---|---|---|
| XCC; 6–7 July 2024 | Japan; Nagano Prefecture | 1 | Toki Sawada | 1 | Urara Kawaguchi |
| XCC; 6–7 July 2024 | Japan; Nagano Prefecture | 2 | Asahi Miyazu | 2 | Akari Kobayashi |
| XCC; 6–7 July 2024 | Japan; Nagano Prefecture | 3 | Issei Matsumoto | 3 | Yui Ishida |

| Date | Venue | Podium (Men) | | Podium (Women) | |
|---|---|---|---|---|---|
| DHI; 20–21 July 2024 | Japan; Gifu Prefecture | 1 | Hajime Imoto | 1 | Tsubasa Hara |
| DHI; 20–21 July 2024 | Japan; Gifu Prefecture | 2 | Kazuki Shimizu | 2 | Hiroka Nakagawa |
| DHI; 20–21 July 2024 | Japan; Gifu Prefecture | 3 | Yuki Kushima | 3 | Misato Watanabe |

=== Kazakhstan ===
| Date | Venue | Podium (Men) | | Podium (Women) | |
|---|---|---|---|---|---|
| XCO; 20–21 July 2024 | Kazakhstan; Burabay | 1 | Yegor Karassyov | 1 | Alina Sarkulova |
| XCO; 20–21 July 2024 | Kazakhstan; Burabay | 2 | Denis Sergiyenko | 2 | Milana Kotelnikova |
| XCO; 20–21 July 2024 | Kazakhstan; Burabay | 3 | Alexey Fefelov | 3 | Madina Zhurtybayeva |

| Date | Venue | Podium (Men) | | Podium (Women) | |
|---|---|---|---|---|---|
| XCC; 20–21 July 2024 | Kazakhstan; Burabay | 1 | Yegor Karassyov | 1 | Alina Sarkulova |
| XCC; 20–21 July 2024 | Kazakhstan; Burabay | 2 | Denis Sergiyenko | 2 | Tatyana Geneleva |
| XCC; 20–21 July 2024 | Kazakhstan; Burabay | 3 | Nikita Galkin | 3 | Milana Kotelnikova |

| Date | Venue | Podium (Men) | Podium (Women) |
|---|---|---|---|
| XCM; 4–5 June 2024 | Kazakhstan; Kostanay | 1 | 1 |
| XCM; 4–5 June 2024 | Kazakhstan; Kostanay | 2 | 2 |
| XCM; 4–5 June 2024 | Kazakhstan; Kostanay | 3 | 3 |

=== Kenya ===
| Date | Venue | Podium (Men) | | Podium (Women) | |
|---|---|---|---|---|---|
| XCO; 13 April 2024 | Kenya; Nairobi (Karura Forest) | 1 | Peter Karanja | 1 | Nancy Akinyi Debe |
| XCO; 13 April 2024 | Kenya; Nairobi (Karura Forest) | 2 | Vincent Chege | 2 | Monica Kiplagat |
| XCO; 13 April 2024 | Kenya; Nairobi (Karura Forest) | 3 | Bill Clintone | 3 | Kendra Tabu |

| Date | Venue | Podium (Men) | Podium (Women) |
|---|---|---|---|
| XCC; 13 April 2024 | Kenya; Nairobi (Karura Forest) | 1 | 1 |
| XCC; 13 April 2024 | Kenya; Nairobi (Karura Forest) | 2 | 2 |
| XCC; 13 April 2024 | Kenya; Nairobi (Karura Forest) | 3 | 3 |

=== Latvia ===
| Date | Venue | Podium (Men) | | Podium (Women) | |
|---|---|---|---|---|---|
| XCO; 20–21 July 2024 | Latvia; Ogre | 1 | Mārtiņš Blūms | 1 | Katrina Jaunslaviete |
| XCO; 20–21 July 2024 | Latvia; Ogre | 2 | Rainers Zviedris | 2 | Evelīna Ermane |
| XCO; 20–21 July 2024 | Latvia; Ogre | 3 | Nauris Zviedris | 3 | Zane Priede |

| Date | Venue | Podium (Men) | | Podium (Women) | |
|---|---|---|---|---|---|
| XCC; 20–21 July 2024 | Latvia; Ogre | 1 | Mārtiņš Blūms | 1 | Evelīna Ermane |
| XCC; 20–21 July 2024 | Latvia; Ogre | 2 | Rainers Zviedris | 2 | Katrina Jaunslaviete |
| XCC; 20–21 July 2024 | Latvia; Ogre | 3 | Nauris Zviedris | 3 | Zane Priede |

=== Liechtenstein ===
| Date | Venue | Podium (Men) | | Podium (Women) |
|---|---|---|---|---|
| XCO; 12–14 July 2024 | Liechtenstein; Échallens (Switzerland) | 1 | Romano Püntener | 1 |
| XCO; 12–14 July 2024 | Liechtenstein; Échallens (Switzerland) | 2 | Felix Sprenger | 2 |
| XCO; 12–14 July 2024 | Liechtenstein; Échallens (Switzerland) | 3 | Flavio Knaus | 3 |

| Date | Venue | Podium (Men) | | Podium (Women) |
|---|---|---|---|---|
| XCC; 12–14 July 2024 | Liechtenstein; Échallens (Switzerland) | 1 | Felix Sprenger | 1 |
| XCC; 12–14 July 2024 | Liechtenstein; Échallens (Switzerland) | 2 | Romano Püntener | 2 |
| XCC; 12–14 July 2024 | Liechtenstein; Échallens (Switzerland) | 3 | Flavio Knaus | 3 |

=== Lithuania ===
| Date | Venue | Podium (Men) | | Podium (Women) | |
|---|---|---|---|---|---|
| XCO; 20 July 2024 | Lithuania; Ogre (Latvia) | 1 | Ignas Ambrazas | 1 | Greta Karasiovaitė |
| XCO; 20 July 2024 | Lithuania; Ogre (Latvia) | 2 | Šarūnas Pacevičius | 2 | Gabrielė Andrašiūnienė |
| XCO; 20 July 2024 | Lithuania; Ogre (Latvia) | 3 | Justinas Biekša | 3 | Algirda Mickuvienė |

| Date | Venue | Podium (Men) | | Podium (Women) | |
|---|---|---|---|---|---|
| XCM; 19 May 2024 | Lithuania; Naujamiestis | 1 | Eimantas Gudiškis | 1 | Greta Karasiovaitė |
| XCM; 19 May 2024 | Lithuania; Naujamiestis | 2 | Artūras Kazakevičius | 2 | Daiva Ragažinskienė |
| XCM; 19 May 2024 | Lithuania; Naujamiestis | 3 | Jonas Maišelis | 3 | Viltė Kriaučiūnaitė |

=== Luxembourg ===
| Date | Venue | Podium (Men) | | Podium (Women) | |
|---|---|---|---|---|---|
| XCO; 13–14 July 2024 | Luxembourg; Mersch | 1 | Tijay Heinen | 1 | Fabienne Schauss |
| XCO; 13–14 July 2024 | Luxembourg; Mersch | 2 | Pol Flesch | 2 | Charlotte Wild |
| XCO; 13–14 July 2024 | Luxembourg; Mersch | 3 | Mik Esser | 3 | |

=== Malaysia ===
| Date | Venue | Podium (Men) | | Podium (Women) | |
|---|---|---|---|---|---|
| XCO; 20–21 July 2024 | Malaysia; Putrajaya | 1 | Ahmad Syazrin Awang Ilah | 1 | Phi Kun Pan |
| XCO; 20–21 July 2024 | Malaysia; Putrajaya | 2 | Zulfikri Zulkifli | 2 | Nur Assyira Zainal Abidin |
| XCO; 20–21 July 2024 | Malaysia; Putrajaya | 3 | Muhammad Fahmi Khairul | 3 | Nur Deena Safia Nor Effandy |

| Date | Venue | Podium (Men) | | Podium (Women) | |
|---|---|---|---|---|---|
| XCC; 20–21 July 2024 | Malaysia; Putrajaya | 1 | Muhammad Syawal Mazlin | 1 | Phi Kun Pan |
| XCC; 20–21 July 2024 | Malaysia; Putrajaya | 2 | Ahmad Syazrin Awang Ilah | 2 | Nur Deena Safia Nor Effandy |
| XCC; 20–21 July 2024 | Malaysia; Putrajaya | 3 | Saniy Syu'aib Mohd Safiee | 3 | Nur Assyira Zainal Abidin |

| Date | Venue | Podium (Men) | | Podium (Women) | |
|---|---|---|---|---|---|
| XCE; 20–21 July 2024 | Malaysia; Putrajaya | 1 | Saniy Syu'aib Mohd Safiee | 1 | Nur Fitrah Shaari |
| XCE; 20–21 July 2024 | Malaysia; Putrajaya | 2 | Mohd Faizikry Jumah | 2 | Nurul Nabilah Mohd Asri |
| XCE; 20–21 July 2024 | Malaysia; Putrajaya | 3 | Zulfikri Zulkifli | 3 | Phi Kun Pan |

| Date | Venue | Podium (Men) | | Podium (Women) | |
|---|---|---|---|---|---|
| DHI; 20–21 July 2024 | Malaysia; Putrajaya | 1 | Amer Akbar Anuar | 1 | Siti Natasha Mohd Basri |
| DHI; 20–21 July 2024 | Malaysia; Putrajaya | 2 | Mohamad Faris Mohd Nashari | 2 | Eddyna Nasuhar Zainal Abidin |
| DHI; 20–21 July 2024 | Malaysia; Putrajaya | 3 | Joe Hwa Lim | 3 | Nurul Azlina Razali |

=== Mauritius ===
| Date | Venue | Podium (Men) | | Podium (Women) | |
|---|---|---|---|---|---|
| XCO; 14 July 2024 | Mauritius; Rivière Noire District | 1 | Alexandre Mayer | 1 | Aurelie Halbwachs |
| XCO; 14 July 2024 | Mauritius; Rivière Noire District | 2 | Yannick Lincoln | 2 | Lucie de Marigny-Lagesse |
| XCO; 14 July 2024 | Mauritius; Rivière Noire District | 3 | Jean-Hugues Begue | 3 | |

=== Namibia ===
| Date | Venue | Podium (Men) | | Podium (Women) | |
|---|---|---|---|---|---|
| XCO; 26–27 April 2024 | Namibia; Windhoek | 1 | Alex Miller | 1 | Monique du Plessis |
| XCO; 26–27 April 2024 | Namibia; Windhoek | 2 | Tristan de Lange | 2 | Jean-Marie Mostert |
| XCO; 26–27 April 2024 | Namibia; Windhoek | 3 | Denzel de Koe | 3 | Mari-Nelia Hough |

| Date | Venue | Podium (Men) | | Podium (Women) | |
|---|---|---|---|---|---|
| XCC; 26–27 April 2024 | Namibia; Windhoek | 1 | Alex Miller | 1 | Monique du Plessis |
| XCC; 26–27 April 2024 | Namibia; Windhoek | 2 | Kevin Lowe | 2 | Jean-Marie Mostert |
| XCC; 26–27 April 2024 | Namibia; Windhoek | 3 | Hugo Hahn | 3 | Nicola Fester |

| Date | Venue | Podium (Men) | | Podium (Women) | |
|---|---|---|---|---|---|
| E-XC; 26–27 April 2024 | Namibia; Windhoek | 1 | Frank Klosta | 1 | Claudia Surén |
| E-XC; 26–27 April 2024 | Namibia; Windhoek | 2 | Rico Steinfurth | 2 | Lionie Meyer |
| E-XC; 26–27 April 2024 | Namibia; Windhoek | 3 | Andre Steinfurth | 3 | Elvira Dickerson |

=== Nepal ===
| Date | Venue | Podium (Men) | | Podium (Women) | |
|---|---|---|---|---|---|
| XCO; 21–22 June 2024 | Nepal; Kathmandu | 1 | Suraj Rana | 1 | Laxmi Magar |
| XCO; 21–22 June 2024 | Nepal; Kathmandu | 2 | Himal Tamata | 2 | Manju Kumari Khadka |
| XCO; 21–22 June 2024 | Nepal; Kathmandu | 3 | Achyut Krishna Kharel | 3 | Gyanu Kumari Chaudhary |

| Date | Venue | Podium (Men) | | Podium (Women) | |
|---|---|---|---|---|---|
| XCM; 21–22 June 2024 | Nepal; Kathmandu | 1 | — | 1 | — |
| XCM; 21–22 June 2024 | Nepal; Kathmandu | 2 | — | 2 | — |
| XCM; 21–22 June 2024 | Nepal; Kathmandu | 3 | — | 3 | — |

| Date | Venue | Podium (Men) | | Podium (Women) | |
|---|---|---|---|---|---|
| DHI; 21–22 June 2024 | Nepal; Kathmandu | 1 | Nirav Shrestha | 1 | Laxmi Magar |
| DHI; 21–22 June 2024 | Nepal; Kathmandu | 2 | Rajesh Magar | 2 | Sanju Tamang |
| DHI; 21–22 June 2024 | Nepal; Kathmandu | 3 | Prachit Thapa Magar | 3 | Indra Kumari Tamang |

=== New Zealand ===
| Date | Venue | Podium (Men) | | Podium (Women) | |
|---|---|---|---|---|---|
| Enduro; 1–3 March 2024 | New Zealand; Nelson | 1 | Brady Stone | 1 | Winnifred Goldsbury |
| Enduro; 1–3 March 2024 | New Zealand; Nelson | 2 | Charles Murray | 2 | Rae Morrison |
| Enduro; 1–3 March 2024 | New Zealand; Nelson | 3 | Lachie Ross | 3 | Xanthe Robb |

| Date | Venue | Podium (Men) | | Podium (Women) | |
|---|---|---|---|---|---|
| Downhill; 24–25 February 2024 | New Zealand; Queenstown | 1 | Tyler Waite | 1 | Jess Blewitt |
| Downhill; 24–25 February 2024 | New Zealand; Queenstown | 2 | Lachlan Stevens-McNab | 2 | Jenna Hastings |
| Downhill; 24–25 February 2024 | New Zealand; Queenstown | 3 | Tuhoto-Ariki Pene | 3 | Eliana Hulsebosch |

| Date | Venue | Podium (Men) | | Podium (Women) | |
|---|---|---|---|---|---|
| XCC; 24–25 February 2024 | New Zealand; Queenstown | 1 | Anton Cooper | 1 | Sammie Maxwell |
| XCC; 24–25 February 2024 | New Zealand; Queenstown | 2 | Ben Oliver | 2 | Maria Laurie |
| XCC; 24–25 February 2024 | New Zealand; Queenstown | 3 | Matthew Wilson | 3 | Mia Cameron |

| Date | Venue | Podium (Men) | | Podium (Women) | |
|---|---|---|---|---|---|
| XCO; 24–25 February 2024 | New Zealand; Queenstown | 1 | Anton Cooper | 1 | Sammie Maxwell |
| XCO; 24–25 February 2024 | New Zealand; Queenstown | 2 | Matthew Wilson | 2 | Josie Wilcox |
| XCO; 24–25 February 2024 | New Zealand; Queenstown | 3 | Ben Oliver | 3 | Maria Laurie |

=== Norway ===
| Date | Venue | Podium (Men) | | Podium (Women) | |
|---|---|---|---|---|---|
| XCO; 30 June 2024 | Norway; Vigrestad | 1 | Knut Røhme | 1 | Oda Laforce |
| XCO; 30 June 2024 | Norway; Vigrestad | 2 | Mats Tubaas Glende | 2 | Lisa Kristine Jorde |
| XCO; 30 June 2024 | Norway; Vigrestad | 3 | William Handley | 3 | Hedda Brenningen Bjørklund |

| Date | Venue | Podium (Men) | | Podium (Women) | |
|---|---|---|---|---|---|
| XCC; 29 June 2024 | Norway; Vigrestad | 1 | Knut Røhme | 1 | Lisa Kristine Jorde |
| XCC; 29 June 2024 | Norway; Vigrestad | 2 | Martin E. Farstadvoll | 2 | Ingrid Bøe Jacobsen |
| XCC; 29 June 2024 | Norway; Vigrestad | 3 | Petter Fagerhaug | 3 | Hedda Brenningen Bjørklund |

| Date | Venue | Podium (Men) | | Podium (Women) | |
|---|---|---|---|---|---|
| XCM; 22 June 2024 | Norway; Birkeland | 1 | Ole Hem | 1 | Sunniva Dring |
| XCM; 22 June 2024 | Norway; Birkeland | 2 | Tormod Weydahl | 2 | Anne Helene Reiten |
| XCM; 22 June 2024 | Norway; Birkeland | 3 | Østen Brovold Midtsundstad | 3 | Celine Gees Solheim |

| Date | Venue | Podium (Men) | | Podium (Women) | |
|---|---|---|---|---|---|
| DHI; 13–14 July 2024 | Norway; Hafjell | 1 | Simen Smestad | 1 | Frida Helena Rønning |
| DHI; 13–14 July 2024 | Norway; Hafjell | 2 | Markus Skeie-Lebreux | 2 | Mille Johnset |
| DHI; 13–14 July 2024 | Norway; Hafjell | 3 | Elias Verstad Stubergh | 3 | Hilde Strædet |

=== North Macedonia ===
| Date | Venue | Podium (Men) | | Podium (Women) | |
|---|---|---|---|---|---|
| XCO; 21 July 2024 | North Macedonia; Kruševo | 1 | Dimitar Jovanoski | 1 | Dunja Ivanova |
| XCO; 21 July 2024 | North Macedonia; Kruševo | 2 | Kiril Markovski | 2 | Andrijana Anastasoska |
| XCO; 21 July 2024 | North Macedonia; Kruševo | 3 | Jovan Panevski | 3 | Elena Petrova |

=== Paraguay ===
| Date | Venue | Podium (Men) | | Podium (Women) | |
|---|---|---|---|---|---|
| XCO; 13–14 July 2024 | Paraguay; Luque | 1 | Esteban Portillo | 1 | Sara María Torres |
| XCO; 13–14 July 2024 | Paraguay; Luque | 2 | Walter Adhemar Oberladstatter | 2 | Silvia María Rodas Maldonado |
| XCO; 13–14 July 2024 | Paraguay; Luque | 3 | Rogelio Melgarejo | 3 | Cristina Aguilera Amarilla |

| Date | Venue | Podium (Men) | | Podium (Women) | |
|---|---|---|---|---|---|
| XCC; 13–14 July 2024 | Paraguay; Luque | 1 | Walter Adhemar Oberladstatter | 1 | Silvia María Rodas Maldonado |
| XCC; 13–14 July 2024 | Paraguay; Luque | 2 | Jhosue Moreno Fleitas | 2 | Sara María Torres |
| XCC; 13–14 July 2024 | Paraguay; Luque | 3 | Abel Cristaldo | 3 | Cristina Aguilera Amarilla |

| Date | Venue | Podium (Men) | | Podium (Women) | |
|---|---|---|---|---|---|
| XCE; 13–14 July 2024 | Paraguay; Luque | 1 | Bruno Zachar | 1 | Sara María Torres |
| XCE; 13–14 July 2024 | Paraguay; Luque | 2 | Brian Woronieski | 2 | Silvia María Rodas Maldonado |
| XCE; 13–14 July 2024 | Paraguay; Luque | 3 | Jhosue Moreno Fleitas | 3 | Cristina Aguilera Amarilla |

=== Peru ===
| Date | Venue | Podium (Men) | | Podium (Women) | |
|---|---|---|---|---|---|
| XCO; 19–20 July 2024 | Peru; Ayacucho | 1 | Rolando Serrano | 1 | Smith Guerrero |
| XCO; 19–20 July 2024 | Peru; Ayacucho | 2 | Ricardo Márquez | 2 | Rocío Elida Cerna Aguilar |
| XCO; 19–20 July 2024 | Peru; Ayacucho | 3 | William Martínez | 3 | Katherine Peñaranda Quito |

| Date | Venue | Podium (Men) | | Podium (Women) |
|---|---|---|---|---|
| XCC; 19–20 July 2024 | Peru; Ayacucho | 1 | Frank Farfan | 1 |
| XCC; 19–20 July 2024 | Peru; Ayacucho | 2 | William Martínez | 2 |
| XCC; 19–20 July 2024 | Peru; Ayacucho | 3 | Ricardo Márquez | 3 |

| Date | Venue | Podium (Men) | | Podium (Women) | |
|---|---|---|---|---|---|
| DHI; 13–14 July 2024 | Peru; Lima | 1 | Carlos Alfaro Peralta | 1 | Carla Arrue Bermeo |
| DHI; 13–14 July 2024 | Peru; Lima | 2 | Alejandro Paz Calmet | 2 | Luz Aquino Apaza |
| DHI; 13–14 July 2024 | Peru; Lima | 3 | Brener Montes Tolentino | 3 | Estela Areni Acurio Céspedes |

=== Philippine ===
| Date | Venue | Podium (Men) | | Podium (Women) | |
|---|---|---|---|---|---|
| XCO; 16–17 March 2024 | Philippines; Indang | 1 | Mark Louwel Valderama | 1 | Shagne Yao |
| XCO; 16–17 March 2024 | Philippines; Indang | 2 | James Carl Dela Cruz | 2 | Adel Pia Sendrijas |
| XCO; 16–17 March 2024 | Philippines; Indang | 3 | Emmanuel Dave Montemayor | 3 | Nicole Quiñones |

| Date | Venue | Podium (Men) | Podium (Women) |
|---|---|---|---|
| XCE; 16–17 March 2024 | Philippines; Indang | 1 | 1 |
| XCE; 16–17 March 2024 | Philippines; Indang | 2 | 2 |
| XCE; 16–17 March 2024 | Philippines; Indang | 3 | 3 |

=== Poland ===
| Date | Venue | Podium (Men) | | Podium (Women) | |
|---|---|---|---|---|---|
| XCO; 28–30 June 2024 | Poland; Białka Tatrzańska | 1 | Krzysztof Łukasik | 1 | Paula Gorycka |
| XCO; 28–30 June 2024 | Poland; Białka Tatrzańska | 2 | Paweł Bernas | 2 | Aleksandra Podgórska |
| XCO; 28–30 June 2024 | Poland; Białka Tatrzańska | 3 | Mateusz Nieboras | 3 | Gabriela Wojtyła |

| Date | Venue | Podium (Men) | | Podium (Women) | |
|---|---|---|---|---|---|
| XCC; 28–30 June 2024 | Poland; Białka Tatrzańska | 1 | Krzysztof Łukasik | 1 | Paula Gorycka |
| XCC; 28–30 June 2024 | Poland; Białka Tatrzańska | 2 | Paweł Bernas | 2 | Aleksandra Podgórska |
| XCC; 28–30 June 2024 | Poland; Białka Tatrzańska | 3 | Karol Ostaszewski | 3 | Gabriela Wojtyła |

=== Portugal ===
| Date | Venue | Podium (Men) | | Podium (Women) | |
|---|---|---|---|---|---|
| XCO; 13–14 July 2024 | Portugal; Algés | 1 | Ricardo Marinheiro | 1 | Raquel Queirós |
| XCO; 13–14 July 2024 | Portugal; Algés | 2 | Roberto Ferreira | 2 | Ana Santos |
| XCO; 13–14 July 2024 | Portugal; Algés | 3 | João Rocha | 3 | Leandra Gomes |

| Date | Venue | Podium (Men) | | Podium (Women) | |
|---|---|---|---|---|---|
| XCC; 13–14 July 2024 | Portugal; Algés | 1 | Ricardo Marinheiro | 1 | Raquel Queirós |
| XCC; 13–14 July 2024 | Portugal; Algés | 2 | Roberto Ferreira | 2 | Ana Santos |
| XCC; 13–14 July 2024 | Portugal; Algés | 3 | João Cruz | 3 | Leandra Gomes |

| Date | Venue | Podium (Men) | | Podium (Women) | |
|---|---|---|---|---|---|
| XCM; 12 May 2024 | Portugal; Ansião | 1 | Tiago Ferreira | 1 | Melissa Maia |
| XCM; 12 May 2024 | Portugal; Ansião | 2 | José Dias | 2 | Celina Carpinteiro |
| XCM; 12 May 2024 | Portugal; Ansião | 3 | Guilherme Mota | 3 | Andreia Freitas |

| Date | Venue | Podium (Men) | | Podium (Women) | |
|---|---|---|---|---|---|
| E-XCM; 12 May 2024 | Portugal; Ansião | 1 | Carlos Brás | 1 | Cátia Santos |
| E-XCM; 12 May 2024 | Portugal; Ansião | 2 | Pedro Carvalho | 2 | Mari Rodrigues |
| E-XCM; 12 May 2024 | Portugal; Ansião | 3 | Pedro Silva | 3 | Cátia Cristóvão |

| Date | Venue | Podium (Men) | | Podium (Women) | |
|---|---|---|---|---|---|
| DHI; 22–23 June 2024 | Portugal; Arcos de Valdevez | 1 | Gonçalo Bandeira | 1 | Margarida Bandeira |
| DHI; 22–23 June 2024 | Portugal; Arcos de Valdevez | 2 | Nuno Zuzarte Reis | 2 | Ana Barbosa |
| DHI; 22–23 June 2024 | Portugal; Arcos de Valdevez | 3 | Rafael Sousa | 3 | Joana Nunes |

=== Puerto Rico ===
| Date | Venue | Podium (Men) | | Podium (Women) | |
|---|---|---|---|---|---|
| XCO; 29–30 June 2024 | Puerto Rico; Ponce | 1 | Georwill Pérez Román | 1 | Suheily Rodríguez |
| XCO; 29–30 June 2024 | Puerto Rico; Ponce | 2 | José Fuentes Colon | 2 | |
| XCO; 29–30 June 2024 | Puerto Rico; Ponce | 3 | Javier López Ayala | 3 | |

| Date | Venue | Podium (Men) | | Podium (Women) | |
|---|---|---|---|---|---|
| XCC; 29–30 June 2024 | Puerto Rico; Ponce | 1 | Georwill Pérez Román | 1 | Suheily Rodríguez |
| XCC; 29–30 June 2024 | Puerto Rico; Ponce | 2 | Darren Colon | 2 | |
| XCC; 29–30 June 2024 | Puerto Rico; Ponce | 3 | Javier López Ayala | 3 | |

| Date | Venue | Podium (Men) | | Podium (Women) | |
|---|---|---|---|---|---|
| DHI; 29–30 June 2024 | Puerto Rico; Ponce | 1 | — | 1 | — |
| DHI; 29–30 June 2024 | Puerto Rico; Ponce | 2 | — | 2 | — |
| DHI; 29–30 June 2024 | Puerto Rico; Ponce | 3 | — | 3 | — |

| Date | Venue | Podium (Men) | | Podium (Women) | |
|---|---|---|---|---|---|
| END; 29–30 June 2024 | Puerto Rico; Ponce | 1 | — | 1 | — |
| END; 29–30 June 2024 | Puerto Rico; Ponce | 2 | — | 2 | — |
| END; 29–30 June 2024 | Puerto Rico; Ponce | 3 | — | 3 | — |

=== Romania ===
| Date | Venue | Podium (Men) | | Podium (Women) | |
|---|---|---|---|---|---|
| XCM; 30 June 2024 | Romania; Sibiu | 1 | József Attila Malnasi | 1 | Manuela Mureșan |
| XCM; 30 June 2024 | Romania; Sibiu | 2 | Alexandru-Sabin Husariu | 2 | Eniko-Salome Stan |
| XCM; 30 June 2024 | Romania; Sibiu | 3 | George-Bogdan Duca | 3 | Suzanne Hilbert |

=== Serbia ===
| Date | Venue | Podium (Men) | | Podium (Women) | |
|---|---|---|---|---|---|
| XCO; 21 July 2024 | Serbia; Fruška Gora | 1 | Aleksandar Roman | 1 | Bojana Jovanović |
| XCO; 21 July 2024 | Serbia; Fruška Gora | 2 | Damjan Stanišić | 2 | Milica Nešić |
| XCO; 21 July 2024 | Serbia; Fruška Gora | 3 | Milan Nešić | 3 | Jana Jolović |

| Date | Venue | Podium (Men) | | Podium (Women) | |
|---|---|---|---|---|---|
| Downhill; 13 July 2024 | Serbia; Niška Banja | 1 | Vladimir Milišić | 1 | Ana Jovanović |
| Downhill; 13 July 2024 | Serbia; Niška Banja | 2 | Aleksandar Roman | 2 | Simona Lazić |
| Downhill; 13 July 2024 | Serbia; Niška Banja | 3 | Bojan Manojlović | 3 | |

=== Singapore ===
| Date | Venue | Podium (Men) | | Podium (Women) | |
|---|---|---|---|---|---|
| XCO; 21 April 2024 | Singapore; Sarimbun Scout Camp | 1 | Arfan Bin Faisal | 1 | Tsalina Yi-Lin Phang |
| XCO; 21 April 2024 | Singapore; Sarimbun Scout Camp | 2 | Riyadh Hakim Bin Lukman | 2 | |
| XCO; 21 April 2024 | Singapore; Sarimbun Scout Camp | 3 | Mohamad Asraf Bin Shariff | 3 | |

| Date | Venue | Podium (Men) | | Podium (Women) | |
|---|---|---|---|---|---|
| Downhill; 10 March 2024 | Singapore; Batam (Indonesia) | 1 | Izzadnaff Abdul Qusyairi Bin Abdul Manaf | 1 | Nur Nasthasia Nadiah Binte Abdul Nazzeer |
| Downhill; 10 March 2024 | Singapore; Batam (Indonesia) | 2 | Brandon Chen | 2 | Nordania Khairunisa Faizal |
| Downhill; 10 March 2024 | Singapore; Batam (Indonesia) | 3 | Slash Cheong | 3 | |

=== Slovakia ===
| Date | Venue | Podium (Men) | | Podium (Women) | |
|---|---|---|---|---|---|
| XCO; 19–21 July 2024 | Slovakia; Košice | 1 | Matej Ulík | 1 | Janka Keseg Števková |
| XCO; 19–21 July 2024 | Slovakia; Košice | 2 | Peter Sagan | 2 | Erika Glajzová |
| XCO; 19–21 July 2024 | Slovakia; Košice | 3 | Florián Papcun | 3 | Tereza Kurnická |

| Date | Venue | Podium (Men) | | Podium (Women) | |
|---|---|---|---|---|---|
| XCC; 19–21 July 2024 | Slovakia; Košice | 1 | Matej Ulík | 1 | Janka Keseg Števková |
| XCC; 19–21 July 2024 | Slovakia; Košice | 2 | Peter Sagan | 2 | Tereza Kurnická |
| XCC; 19–21 July 2024 | Slovakia; Košice | 3 | Florián Papcun | 3 | Tereza Birošová |

| Date | Venue | Podium (Men) | | Podium (Women) | |
|---|---|---|---|---|---|
| XCM; 18 May 2024 | Slovakia; Rajecké Teplice | 1 | Rudolf Dzureň | 1 | Martina Krahulcová |
| XCM; 18 May 2024 | Slovakia; Rajecké Teplice | 2 | Martin Kostelničák | 2 | Janka Keseg Števková |
| XCM; 18 May 2024 | Slovakia; Rajecké Teplice | 3 | Martin Siran | 3 | Kristína Neč-Lapinová |

| Date | Venue | Podium (Men) | | Podium (Women) | |
|---|---|---|---|---|---|
| EDR; 27–28 July 2024 | Slovakia; Žilina | 1 | Ľuboš Staňo | 1 | Simona Kuchyňková |
| EDR; 27–28 July 2024 | Slovakia; Žilina | 2 | Martin Knapec | 2 | Aneta Kamenská |
| EDR; 27–28 July 2024 | Slovakia; Žilina | 3 | Samuel Paučin | 3 | Natália Ďugelová |

=== Slovenia ===
| Date | Venue | Podium (Men) | | Podium (Women) | |
|---|---|---|---|---|---|
| XCO; 20 July 2024 | Slovenia; Trbovlje | 1 | Rok Naglič | 1 | Vita Movrin |
| XCO; 20 July 2024 | Slovenia; Trbovlje | 2 | Matic Kranjec Žagar | 2 | Tanja Žakelj |
| XCO; 20 July 2024 | Slovenia; Trbovlje | 3 | Mihael Štajnar | 3 | Maruša Naglič |

| Date | Venue | Podium (Men) | | Podium (Women) | |
|---|---|---|---|---|---|
| XCC; 5 May 2024 | Slovenia; Ljubljana | 1 | Rok Naglič | 1 | Tanja Žakelj |
| XCC; 5 May 2024 | Slovenia; Ljubljana | 2 | Matic Kranjec Žagar | 2 | Vita Movrin |
| XCC; 5 May 2024 | Slovenia; Ljubljana | 3 | Jakob Klemenčič | 3 | Maruša Naglič |

| Date | Venue | Podium (Men) | | Podium (Women) | |
|---|---|---|---|---|---|
| DHI; 30 June 2024 | Slovenia; Kranjska Gora | 1 | Tilen Leban | 1 | Monika Hrastnik |
| DHI; 30 June 2024 | Slovenia; Kranjska Gora | 2 | Miran Vauh | 2 | Tina Smrdel |
| DHI; 30 June 2024 | Slovenia; Kranjska Gora | 3 | Matej Osolin | 3 | Maša Komel |

| Date | Venue | Podium (Men) | | Podium (Women) | |
|---|---|---|---|---|---|
| END; 22–23 June 2024 | Slovenia; Novo Mesto | 1 | Vid Peršak | 1 | Maša Komel |
| END; 22–23 June 2024 | Slovenia; Novo Mesto | 2 | Miha Smrdel | 2 | Maja Vojska |
| END; 22–23 June 2024 | Slovenia; Novo Mesto | 3 | David Ivartnik | 3 | Lucija Mlinar |

=== South Africa ===
| Date | Venue | Podium (Men) | | Podium (Women) | |
|---|---|---|---|---|---|
| XCO; 4 May 2024 | South Africa; Cape Town | 1 | Michael Foster | 1 | Candice Lill |
| XCO; 4 May 2024 | South Africa; Cape Town | 2 | Johann van Zyl | 2 | Ila Stow |
| XCO; 4 May 2024 | South Africa; Cape Town | 3 | Luca Ruwiel | 3 | Cherise Willeit |

| Date | Venue | Podium (Men) | | Podium (Women) | |
|---|---|---|---|---|---|
| XCC; 3 May 2024 | South Africa; Cape Town | 1 | Alan Hatherly | 1 | Candice Lill |
| XCC; 3 May 2024 | South Africa; Cape Town | 2 | Luke Moir | 2 | Tyler Jacobs |
| XCC; 3 May 2024 | South Africa; Cape Town | 3 | Ernest Roets | 3 | Riley Smith |

| Date | Venue | Podium (Men) | | Podium (Women) | |
|---|---|---|---|---|---|
| XCM; 26 May 2024 | South Africa; Durban | 1 | Wessel Botha | 1 | Danielle Strydom |
| XCM; 26 May 2024 | South Africa; Durban | 2 | Tristan Nortje | 2 | Samantha Sanders |
| XCM; 26 May 2024 | South Africa; Durban | 3 | Jaedon Terlouw | 3 | Tyler Jacobs |

| Date | Venue | Podium (Men) | | Podium (Women) | |
|---|---|---|---|---|---|
| Enduro; 3 March 2024 | South Africa; Cape Town | 1 | Stefan Garlicki | 1 | Frances Du Toit |
| Enduro; 3 March 2024 | South Africa; Cape Town | 2 | Rory Kirk | 2 | Sabine Thies |
| Enduro; 3 March 2024 | South Africa; Cape Town | 3 | Johann Potgieter | 3 | Jenna Byrnes |

=== Spain ===
| Date | Venue | Podium (Men) | | Podium (Women) | |
|---|---|---|---|---|---|
| XCO; 12–14 July 2024 | Spain; El Almendro | 1 | David Valero | 1 | Estíbaliz Sagardoy |
| XCO; 12–14 July 2024 | Spain; El Almendro | 2 | David Campos | 2 | Núria Bosch Picó |
| XCO; 12–14 July 2024 | Spain; El Almendro | 3 | Jofre Cullell | 3 | Sofia Rodríguez |

| Date | Venue | Podium (Men) | | Podium (Women) | |
|---|---|---|---|---|---|
| XCC; 12–14 July 2024 | Spain; El Almendro | 1 | David Campos | 1 | Sofia Rodríguez |
| XCC; 12–14 July 2024 | Spain; El Almendro | 2 | David Valero | 2 | Marta Cano |
| XCC; 12–14 July 2024 | Spain; El Almendro | 3 | Jofre Cullell | 3 | Lucía Gómez Andreu |

| Date | Venue | Podium (Men) | | Podium (Women) | |
|---|---|---|---|---|---|
| XCE; 12–14 July 2024 | Spain; El Almendro | 1 | Alberto Mingorance | 1 | Amparo Chapa |
| XCE; 12–14 July 2024 | Spain; El Almendro | 2 | Miguel Díaz Pérez | 2 | Sara Cueto Vega |
| XCE; 12–14 July 2024 | Spain; El Almendro | 3 | Alberto Pedreira Estévez | 3 | Alba Fernández Monteoliva |

| Date | Venue | Podium (Men) | | Podium (Women) | |
|---|---|---|---|---|---|
| XCM; 23 June 2024 | Spain; Lalín | 1 | José María Sánchez Ruiz | 1 | Natalia Fischer Egusquiza |
| XCM; 23 June 2024 | Spain; Lalín | 2 | Roberto Bou Martín | 2 | Sofia Rodríguez |
| XCM; 23 June 2024 | Spain; Lalín | 3 | Marcos García | 3 | María del Pilar Fernández Hernández |

| Date | Venue | Podium (Men) | | Podium (Women) | |
|---|---|---|---|---|---|
| DHI; 27–28 July 2024 | Spain; La Pinilla ski resort | 1 | Daniel Castellanos Liberal | 1 | Cristina Menéndez |
| DHI; 27–28 July 2024 | Spain; La Pinilla ski resort | 2 | Angel Suárez Alonso | 2 | Kira Zamora |
| DHI; 27–28 July 2024 | Spain; La Pinilla ski resort | 3 | Pau Menoyo Busquets | 3 | Sara Yusto |

| Date | Venue | Podium (Men) | | Podium (Women) | |
|---|---|---|---|---|---|
| END; 16 June 2024 | Spain; Castejón de Sos | 1 | Edgar Carballo | 1 | Cristina Menéndez |
| END; 16 June 2024 | Spain; Castejón de Sos | 2 | Marco Veiga | 2 | Sara Yusto |
| END; 16 June 2024 | Spain; Castejón de Sos | 3 | Adrián Cuéllar | 3 | Marta Jordan Tornil |

=== Sweden ===
| Date | Venue | Podium (Men) | | Podium (Women) | |
|---|---|---|---|---|---|
| XCO; 18 July 2024 | Sweden; Alingsås | 1 | Oscar Lind | 1 | Jenny Rissveds |
| XCO; 18 July 2024 | Sweden; Alingsås | 2 | Leo Lounela | 2 | Linn Gustafzzon |
| XCO; 18 July 2024 | Sweden; Alingsås | 3 | Viktor Lindqvist | 3 | Emma Belforth |

| Date | Venue | Podium (Men) | | Podium (Women) | |
|---|---|---|---|---|---|
| XCE; 26 June 2024 | Sweden; Västerås | 1 | Oliver Vesterlund | 1 | Elin Karlsson |
| XCE; 26 June 2024 | Sweden; Västerås | 2 | Andreas Dahlgren | 2 | Ida Ossiansson |
| XCE; 26 June 2024 | Sweden; Västerås | 3 | Lukas Merkel | 3 | Agnes Abrahamsson |

| Date | Venue | Podium (Men) | | Podium (Women) | |
|---|---|---|---|---|---|
| PUM; 13 July 2024 | Sweden; Vallåsen | 1 | Love Sylwan | 1 | Astrid Stoltz |
| PUM; 13 July 2024 | Sweden; Vallåsen | 2 | Albin Johansson | 2 | Felicia Klingström |
| PUM; 13 July 2024 | Sweden; Vallåsen | 3 | Filip Svanberg | 3 | |

=== Switzerland ===
| Date | Venue | Podium (Men) | | Podium (Women) | |
|---|---|---|---|---|---|
| XCO; 12–14 July 2024 | Switzerland; Échallens | 1 | Filippo Colombo | 1 | Linda Indergand |
| XCO; 12–14 July 2024 | Switzerland; Échallens | 2 | Joel Roth | 2 | Sina Frei |
| XCO; 12–14 July 2024 | Switzerland; Échallens | 3 | Nino Schurter | 3 | Nicole Koller |

| Date | Venue | Podium (Men) | | Podium (Women) | |
|---|---|---|---|---|---|
| XCC; 12–14 July 2024 | Switzerland; Échallens | 1 | Lars Forster | 1 | Nicole Koller |
| XCC; 12–14 July 2024 | Switzerland; Échallens | 2 | Marcel Guerrini | 2 | Linda Indergand |
| XCC; 12–14 July 2024 | Switzerland; Échallens | 3 | Thomas Litscher | 3 | Steffi Häberlin |

| Date | Venue | Podium (Men) | | Podium (Women) | |
|---|---|---|---|---|---|
| DHI; 22 June 2024 | Switzerland; Lenzerheide | 1 | Janis Lehmann | 1 | Lisa Baumann |
| DHI; 22 June 2024 | Switzerland; Lenzerheide | 2 | Mike Huter | 2 | Emma Iten |
| DHI; 22 June 2024 | Switzerland; Lenzerheide | 3 | Noel Niederberger | 3 | Jolanda Kiener |

=== Thailand ===
| Date | Venue | Podium (Men) | | Podium (Women) | |
|---|---|---|---|---|---|
| XCO; 16–18 February 2024 | Thailand; Kanchanaburi | 1 | Keerati Sukprasart | 1 | Supaksorn Nuntana |
| XCO; 16–18 February 2024 | Thailand; Kanchanaburi | 2 | Dechthanasit Kraising | 2 | Sukchom Arita |
| XCO; 16–18 February 2024 | Thailand; Kanchanaburi | 3 | Suphawit Somsin | 3 | |

| Date | Venue | Podium (Men) | | Podium (Women) | |
|---|---|---|---|---|---|
| Downhill; 16–18 February 2024 | Thailand; Kanchanaburi | 1 | Methasit Boonsane | 1 | Vipavee Deekaballes |
| Downhill; 16–18 February 2024 | Thailand; Kanchanaburi | 2 | Chinnapat Sukchanya | 2 | Kanokrat Ritthidet |
| Downhill; 16–18 February 2024 | Thailand; Kanchanaburi | 3 | Saranvit Rassamee | 3 | Siraphatson Chatkamnoed |

| Date | Venue | Podium (Men) | | Podium (Women) | |
|---|---|---|---|---|---|
| XCE; 16–18 February 2024 | Thailand; Kanchanaburi | 1 | Watcharakorn Onthuree | 1 | Vipavee Deekaballes |
| XCE; 16–18 February 2024 | Thailand; Kanchanaburi | 2 | Pholachat Nakthongkam | 2 | Siraphatson Chatkamnoed |
| XCE; 16–18 February 2024 | Thailand; Kanchanaburi | 3 | Pathomporn Pathomtossaporn | 3 | Piranan Maneerattananon |

=== Turkey ===
| Date | Venue | Podium (Men) | | Podium (Women) | |
|---|---|---|---|---|---|
| XCO; 20 July 2024 | Turkey; Erzurum | 1 | Emre Yavuz | 1 | Azize Bekar |
| XCO; 20 July 2024 | Turkey; Erzurum | 2 | Ahmet Akpınar | 2 | Ekin Ereke |
| XCO; 20 July 2024 | Turkey; Erzurum | 3 | Furkan Akçam | 3 | Sevim Gerçek |

| Date | Venue | Podium (Men) | | Podium (Women) | |
|---|---|---|---|---|---|
| XCC; 19 July 2024 | Turkey; Erzurum | 1 | Emre Yavuz | 1 | Azize Bekar |
| XCC; 19 July 2024 | Turkey; Erzurum | 2 | Furkan Akçam | 2 | Ekin Ereke |
| XCC; 19 July 2024 | Turkey; Erzurum | 3 | Ufuk Taş | 3 | Sevim Gerçek |

| Date | Venue | Podium (Men) | | Podium (Women) | |
|---|---|---|---|---|---|
| XCM; 30 June 2024 | Turkey; Manisa | 1 | Samet Bulut | 1 | Azize Bekar |
| XCM; 30 June 2024 | Turkey; Manisa | 2 | Zeki Kaygısız | 2 | Sevim Gerçek |
| XCM; 30 June 2024 | Turkey; Manisa | 3 | Emre Yuca | 3 | Eki̇n Ereke |

| Date | Venue | Podium (Men) | | Podium (Women) | |
|---|---|---|---|---|---|
| XCE; 21 July 2024 | Turkey; Erzurum | 1 | Furkan Akçam | 1 | Azize Bekar |
| XCE; 21 July 2024 | Turkey; Erzurum | 2 | Emre Yavuz | 2 | Emine Sezer |
| XCE; 21 July 2024 | Turkey; Erzurum | 3 | Samet Bastatar | 3 | Eki̇n Ereke |

=== Ukraine ===
| Date | Venue | Podium (Men) | | Podium (Women) | |
|---|---|---|---|---|---|
| XCO; 12–14 July 2024 | Ukraine; Kamianets-Podilskyi | 1 | Dmytro Titarenko | 1 | Yana Belomoyna |
| XCO; 12–14 July 2024 | Ukraine; Kamianets-Podilskyi | 2 | Oleksandr Koniaiev | 2 | Iryna Slobodyan |
| XCO; 12–14 July 2024 | Ukraine; Kamianets-Podilskyi | 3 | Serhiy Rysenko | 3 | Maria Sherstiuk |

| Date | Venue | Podium (Men) | | Podium (Women) | |
|---|---|---|---|---|---|
| XCC; 12–14 July 2024 | Ukraine; Kamianets-Podilskyi | 1 | Volodymyr Obukhivskyi | 1 | Yana Belomoyna |
| XCC; 12–14 July 2024 | Ukraine; Kamianets-Podilskyi | 2 | Dmytro Titarenko | 2 | Mariia Sukhopalova |
| XCC; 12–14 July 2024 | Ukraine; Kamianets-Podilskyi | 3 | Anton Rybka | 3 | Iryna Slobodyan |

| Date | Venue | Podium (Men) | | Podium (Women) | |
|---|---|---|---|---|---|
| XCE; 12–14 July 2024 | Ukraine; Kamianets-Podilskyi | 1 | Dmytro Melnichenko | 1 | Mariia Orekhova |
| XCE; 12–14 July 2024 | Ukraine; Kamianets-Podilskyi | 2 | Anton Pustovit | 2 | Iryna Slobodyan |
| XCE; 12–14 July 2024 | Ukraine; Kamianets-Podilskyi | 3 | Andrii Khomenko | 3 | Kateryna Naberezhna |

=== United States ===
| Date | Venue | Podium (Men) | | Podium (Women) | |
|---|---|---|---|---|---|
| XCO; 16–21 July 2024 | United States; Macungie | 1 | Bjorn Riley | 1 | Kelsey Urban |
| XCO; 16–21 July 2024 | United States; Macungie | 2 | Robbie Day | 2 | Kate Courtney |
| XCO; 16–21 July 2024 | United States; Macungie | 3 | Devon Feehan | 3 | Gwendalyn Gibson |

| Date | Venue | Podium (Men) | | Podium (Women) | |
|---|---|---|---|---|---|
| XCC; 16–21 July 2024 | United States; Macungie | 1 | Bjorn Riley | 1 | Kelsey Urban |
| XCC; 16–21 July 2024 | United States; Macungie | 2 | Robbie Day | 2 | Kate Courtney |
| XCC; 16–21 July 2024 | United States; Macungie | 3 | Devon Feehan | 3 | Gwendalyn Gibson |

| Date | Venue | Podium (Men) | | Podium (Women) | |
|---|---|---|---|---|---|
| XCM; 15 June 2024 | United States; Auburn | 1 | Carson Beckett | 1 | Alexis Skarda |
| XCM; 15 June 2024 | United States; Auburn | 2 | Bradyn Lange | 2 | Hannah Otto |
| XCM; 15 June 2024 | United States; Auburn | 3 | Jerry Dufour | 3 | Deanna Mayles |

=== Venezuela ===
| Date | Venue | Podium (Men) | | Podium (Women) | |
|---|---|---|---|---|---|
| XCO; 20–21 July 2024 | Venezuela; Guárico | 1 | Sandro Muñoz Maneiro | 1 | Ingrid Porras |
| XCO; 20–21 July 2024 | Venezuela; Guárico | 2 | Alfonso Márquez | 2 | Leydi Martinez Peaspan |
| XCO; 20–21 July 2024 | Venezuela; Guárico | 3 | Rudy Jose Rodriguez Leon | 3 | Katherine Lindo |

| Date | Venue | Podium (Men) | | Podium (Women) | |
|---|---|---|---|---|---|
| XCC; 20–21 July 2024 | Venezuela; Guárico | 1 | Sandro Muñoz Maneiro | 1 | Ingrid Porras |
| XCC; 20–21 July 2024 | Venezuela; Guárico | 2 | Alfonso Márquez | 2 | Andrea Del Mar Contreras Uribe |
| XCC; 20–21 July 2024 | Venezuela; Guárico | 3 | Rudy Jose Rodriguez Leon | 3 | Leydi Martinez Peaspan |

| Date | Venue | Podium (Men) | Podium (Women) |
|---|---|---|---|
| XCE; 20–21 July 2024 | Venezuela; Guárico | 1 | 1 |
| XCE; 20–21 July 2024 | Venezuela; Guárico | 2 | 2 |
| XCE; 20–21 July 2024 | Venezuela; Guárico | 3 | 3 |

| Date | Venue | Podium (Men) | Podium (Women) |
|---|---|---|---|
| E-XC; 20–21 July 2024 | Venezuela; Guárico | 1 | 1 |
| E-XC; 20–21 July 2024 | Venezuela; Guárico | 2 | 2 |
| E-XC; 20–21 July 2024 | Venezuela; Guárico | 3 | 3 |

=== Zimbabwe ===
| Date | Venue | Podium (Men) | | Podium (Women) | |
|---|---|---|---|---|---|
| XCO; 20–21 July 2024 | Zimbabwe; Harare | 1 | Pressmore Musundi | 1 | Erin Elliott |
| XCO; 20–21 July 2024 | Zimbabwe; Harare | 2 | Nkulumo Dube | 2 | Stacey Hyslop |
| XCO; 20–21 July 2024 | Zimbabwe; Harare | 3 | Tinashe Marima | 3 | |

| Date | Venue | Podium (Men) | | Podium (Women) | |
|---|---|---|---|---|---|
| XCC; 20–21 July 2024 | Zimbabwe; Harare | 1 | Pressmore Musundi | 1 | Stacey Hyslop |
| XCC; 20–21 July 2024 | Zimbabwe; Harare | 2 | Nkulumo Dube | 2 | Kirsty Chambers |
| XCC; 20–21 July 2024 | Zimbabwe; Harare | 3 | Tinashe Marima | 3 | Helen Mitchell |

| Date | Venue | Podium (Men) | Podium (Women) |
|---|---|---|---|
| XCM; 20–21 July 2024 | Zimbabwe; Harare | 1 | 1 |
| XCM; 20–21 July 2024 | Zimbabwe; Harare | 2 | 2 |
| XCM; 20–21 July 2024 | Zimbabwe; Harare | 3 | 3 |

== World Championships ==
=== XCE ===
| Date | Venue | Podium (Men) | | Podium (Women) | |
|---|---|---|---|---|---|
| XCE; 13 July 2024 | Germany; Aalen | 1 | Jeroen van Eck (NED) | 1 | Gaia Tormena (ITA) |
| XCE; 13 July 2024 | Germany; Aalen | 2 | Jakob Klemenčič (SLO) | 2 | Lia Schrievers (GER) |
| XCE; 13 July 2024 | Germany; Aalen | 3 | Simon Gegenheimer (GER) | 3 | Marion Fromberger (GER) |

=== Snow Bike ===
| Date | Venue | Podium (Men) | | Podium (Women) | |
|---|---|---|---|---|---|
| Snow Bike; 10–11 February 2024 | France; Châtel | 1 | Pierre Thevenard (FRA) (Super G); Pierre Thevenard (FRA) (Dual Slalom) | 1 | Morgane Such (FRA) (Super G); Lisa Baumann (SUI) (Dual Slalom) |
| Snow Bike; 10–11 February 2024 | France; Châtel | 2 | Henry Kerr (IRL) (Super G); Vincent Tupin (FRA) (Dual Slalom) | 2 | Veronika Widmann (ITA) (Super G); Morgane Such (FRA) (Dual Slalom) |
| Snow Bike; 10–11 February 2024 | France; Châtel | 3 | Vincent Tupin (FRA) (Super G); Henry Kerr (IRL) (Dual Slalom) | 3 | Lisa Baumann (SUI) (Super G); Morgane Charre (FRA) (Dual Slalom) |

== Continental Championships ==
=== Europe ===
| Date | Venue | Podium (Men) | | Podium (Women) | |
|---|---|---|---|---|---|
| XCO; 8–12 May 2024 | Romania; Cheile Grădiștei | 1 | Simone Avondetto (ITA) | 1 | Puck Pieterse (NED) |
| XCO; 8–12 May 2024 | Romania; Cheile Grădiștei | 2 | Simon Andreassen (DEN) | 2 | Mona Mitterwallner (AUT) |
| XCO; 8–12 May 2024 | Romania; Cheile Grădiștei | 3 | Julian Schelb (GER) | 3 | Nina Benz (GER) |

| Date | Venue | Podium (Men) | | Podium (Women) | |
|---|---|---|---|---|---|
| XCC; 8–12 May 2024 | Romania; Cheile Grădiștei | 1 | Simon Andreassen (DEN) | 1 | Pauline Ferrand-Prévot (FRA) |
| XCC; 8–12 May 2024 | Romania; Cheile Grădiștei | 2 | Julian Schelb (GER) | 2 | Puck Pieterse (NED) |
| XCC; 8–12 May 2024 | Romania; Cheile Grădiștei | 3 | Luca Braidot (ITA) | 3 | Nicole Koller (SUI) |

| Date | Venue | Podium | |
|---|---|---|---|
| XCR; 8–12 May 2024 | Romania; Cheile Grădiștei | 1 | Italy (ITA); Simone Avondetto; Matteo Siffredi; Chiara Teocchi; Giada Martinoli; Valentina Corvi; Mattia Stenico |
| XCR; 8–12 May 2024 | Romania; Cheile Grădiștei | 2 | France (FRA); Yannis Musy; Nicolas Kalanquin; Olivia Onesti; Tatiana Tournut; Anaïs Moulin; Titouan Carod |
| XCR; 8–12 May 2024 | Romania; Cheile Grădiștei | 3 | Switzerland (SUI); Finn Treudler; Nicolas Halter; Ramona Forchini; Anina Hutter; Muriel Furrer; Thomas Litscher |

| Date | Venue | Podium (Men) | | Podium (Women) | |
|---|---|---|---|---|---|
| DHI; 9–11 August 2024 | Switzerland; Champéry | 1 | Andreas Kolb (AUT) | 1 | Lisa Baumann (SUI) |
| DHI; 9–11 August 2024 | Switzerland; Champéry | 2 | Matt Walker (GBR) | 2 | Valentina Höll (AUT) |
| DHI; 9–11 August 2024 | Switzerland; Champéry | 3 | Loïc Martin (FRA) | 3 | Marine Cabirou (FRA) |

| Date | Venue | Podium (Men) | | Podium (Women) | |
|---|---|---|---|---|---|
| XCM; 18 August 2024 | Denmark; Viborg | 1 | Lukas Baum (GER) | 1 | Rosa van Doorn (NED) |
| XCM; 18 August 2024 | Denmark; Viborg | 2 | David Valero (ESP) | 2 | Lejla Njemčević (BIH) |
| XCM; 18 August 2024 | Denmark; Viborg | 3 | Fabian Rabensteiner (ITA) | 3 | Claudia Peretti (ITA) |

=== Africa ===
| Date | Venue | Podium (Men) | | Podium (Women) | |
|---|---|---|---|---|---|
| XCO; 11–12 May 2024 | Morocco; Casablanca | 1 | Alan Hatherly (RSA) | 1 | Candice Lill (RSA) |
| XCO; 11–12 May 2024 | Morocco; Casablanca | 2 | Alex Miller (NAM) | 2 | Aurelie Halbwachs (MRI) |
| XCO; 11–12 May 2024 | Morocco; Casablanca | 3 | Luke Moir (RSA) | 3 | Monica Kiplagat (KEN) |

| Date | Venue | Podium (Men) | | Podium (Women) | |
|---|---|---|---|---|---|
| XCC; 11–12 May 2024 | Morocco; Casablanca | 1 | Alan Hatherly (RSA) | 1 | Candice Lill (RSA) |
| XCC; 11–12 May 2024 | Morocco; Casablanca | 2 | Luke Moir (RSA) | 2 | Aurelie Halbwachs (MRI) |
| XCC; 11–12 May 2024 | Morocco; Casablanca | 3 | Alex Miller (NAM) | 3 | Grace Kamindo (KEN) |

=== Americas ===
| Date | Venue | Podium (Men) | | Podium (Women) | |
|---|---|---|---|---|---|
| XCO; 8–12 May 2024 | United States; Midway City | 1 | Christopher Blevins (USA) | 1 | Haley Batten (USA) |
| XCO; 8–12 May 2024 | United States; Midway City | 2 | Adair Gutiérrez (MEX) | 2 | Kate Courtney (USA) |
| XCO; 8–12 May 2024 | United States; Midway City | 3 | Gunnar Holmgren (CAN) | 3 | Sandra Walter (CAN) |

| Date | Venue | Podium (Men) | | Podium (Women) | |
|---|---|---|---|---|---|
| XCC; 8–12 May 2024 | United States; Midway City | 1 | Riley Amos (USA) | 1 | Haley Batten (USA) |
| XCC; 8–12 May 2024 | United States; Midway City | 2 | Christopher Blevins (USA) | 2 | Kate Courtney (USA) |
| XCC; 8–12 May 2024 | United States; Midway City | 3 | Gunnar Holmgren (CAN) | 3 | Bailey Cioppa (USA) |

| Date | Venue | Podium (Men) | | Podium (Women) | |
|---|---|---|---|---|---|
| XCE; 8–12 May 2024 | United States; Midway City | 1 | Carter Hall (USA) | 1 | Iara Caetano (BRA) |
| XCE; 8–12 May 2024 | United States; Midway City | 2 | Daniel Noyola (MEX) | 2 | Melissa Vargas (COL) |
| XCE; 8–12 May 2024 | United States; Midway City | 3 | Erick Fierro Proaño (ECU) | 3 | Mikela Molina (ECU) |

| Date | Venue | Podium (Men) | | Podium (Women) | |
|---|---|---|---|---|---|
| XCM; 7–9 June 2024 | Brazil; Goianá | 1 | Sebastián Gesche Antona (CHI) | 1 | Karen Olímpio (BRA) |
| XCM; 7–9 June 2024 | Brazil; Goianá | 2 | José Gabriel Marques (BRA) | 2 | Mikela Molina (ECU) |
| XCM; 7–9 June 2024 | Brazil; Goianá | 3 | Bruno Lemes (BRA) | 3 | Isabella Lacerda (BRA) |

| Date | Venue | Podium | |
|---|---|---|---|
| XCR; 8–12 May 2024 | United States; Midway City | 1 | United States (USA); Riley Amos; Nicholas Konecny; Haley Batten; Elisabeth Knight; Madigan Munro; Christopher Blevins |
| XCR; 8–12 May 2024 | United States; Midway City | 2 | Canada (CAN); Noah Ramsay; Félix Antoine Leclair; Sandra Walter; Ella MacPhee; Rafaelle Carrier; Léandre Bouchard |
| XCR; 8–12 May 2024 | United States; Midway City | 3 | Brazil (BRA); Gustavo Pereira; Henrique Ribeiro Bravo; Giuliana Salvini Morgen; Nina Carvalho; Hercília Najara; Eiki Yamauchi Leoncio |

=== Asia ===
| Date | Venue | Podium (Men) | | Podium (Women) | |
|---|---|---|---|---|---|
| XCO; 8–12 May 2024 | Malaysia; Putrajaya | 1 | Toki Sawada (JPN) | 1 | Wu Zhifan (CHN) |
| XCO; 8–12 May 2024 | Malaysia; Putrajaya | 2 | Denis Sergiyenko (KAZ) | 2 | Li Hongfeng (CHN) |
| XCO; 8–12 May 2024 | Malaysia; Putrajaya | 3 | Yuan Jinwei (CHN) | 3 | Yang Maocuo (CHN) |

| Date | Venue | Podium (Men) | | Podium (Women) | |
|---|---|---|---|---|---|
| DHI; 8–12 May 2024 | Malaysia; Putrajaya | 1 | Methasit Boonsane (THA) | 1 | Milatul Khaqimah (INA) |
| DHI; 8–12 May 2024 | Malaysia; Putrajaya | 2 | Sheng Shan Chiang (TPE) | 2 | Vipavee Deekaballes (THA) |
| DHI; 8–12 May 2024 | Malaysia; Putrajaya | 3 | Rendy Varera Sanjaya (INA) | 3 | Riska Amelia Agustina (INA) |

| Date | Venue | Podium (Men) | | Podium (Women) | |
|---|---|---|---|---|---|
| XCE; 8–12 May 2024 | Malaysia; Putrajaya | 1 | Zulfikri Zulkifli (MAS) | 1 | Gao Yuanpan (CHN) |
| XCE; 8–12 May 2024 | Malaysia; Putrajaya | 2 | Gart Gaerlan (PHI) | 2 | Sayu Bella Sukma Dewi (INA) |
| XCE; 8–12 May 2024 | Malaysia; Putrajaya | 3 | Ahmad Syazrin Awang Ilah (MAS) | 3 | Nur Fitrah Shaari (MAS) |

| Date | Venue | Podium | |
|---|---|---|---|
| XCR; 8–12 May 2024 | Malaysia; Putrajaya | 1 | China (CHN); Mi Jiujiang |
| XCR; 8–12 May 2024 | Malaysia; Putrajaya | 2 | Indonesia (INA); Adrian Kurniawan |
| XCR; 8–12 May 2024 | Malaysia; Putrajaya | 3 | Kazakhstan (KAZ); Denis Sergiyenko |

=== Oceania ===
| Date | Venue | Podium (Men) | | Podium (Women) | |
|---|---|---|---|---|---|
| XCO; 23 March 2024 | Australia; Brisbane | 1 | Anton Cooper (NZL) | 1 | Sammie Maxwell (NZL) |
| XCO; 23 March 2024 | Australia; Brisbane | 2 | Sam Fox (AUS) | 2 | Zoe Cuthbert (AUS) |
| XCO; 23 March 2024 | Australia; Brisbane | 3 | Caleb Bottcher (NZL) | 3 | Rebecca Henderson (AUS) |

| Date | Venue | Podium (Men) | | Podium (Women) | |
|---|---|---|---|---|---|
| DHI; 23 May 2024 | Australia; Cairns | 1 | Michael Hannah (AUS) | 1 | Tracey Hannah (AUS) |
| DHI; 23 May 2024 | Australia; Cairns | 2 | Connor Fearon (AUS) | 2 | Elleni Turkovic (AUS) |
| DHI; 23 May 2024 | Australia; Cairns | 3 | Joel Sutherland (AUS) | 3 | Bellah Birchall (NZL) |
