= Kyle Schmid =

Canadian actor

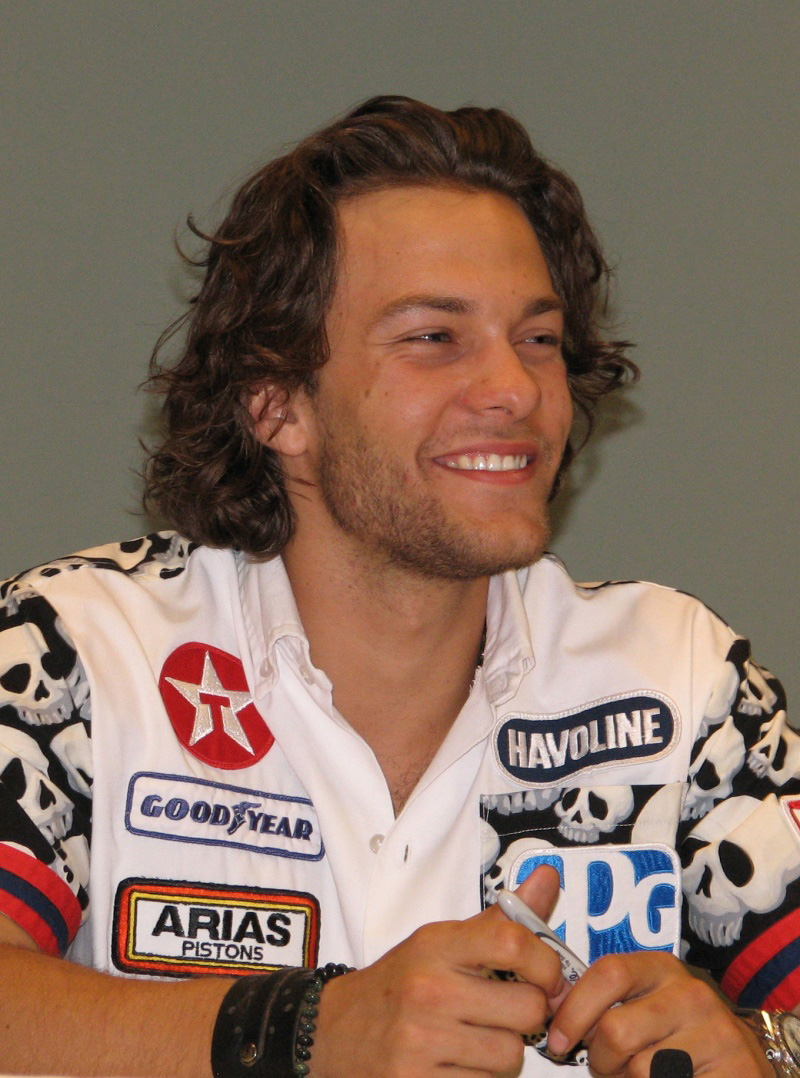
- Schmid at Mega Con in Orlando, Florida, March 2008
- Born: August 3, 1984 (age 42); Mississauga, Ontario, Canada
- Occupation: Actor
- Years active: 1996–present
- Spouse: Caity Lotz (m. 2023)
- Children: 2

Kyle Schmid (born August 3, 1984) is a Canadian actor, best known for his roles as Alex Caulder in History's Six, Henry Durham in Syfy's Being Human, Robert Morehouse in BBC America's Copper and Aaron Abbot in The Covenant (2006). In 2021, Schmid had a recurring role on ABC's television drama Big Sky. He currently stars as NCIS Special Agent Mike Franks in NCIS prequel series NCIS: Origins.

== Early life ==
Schmid was born in Mississauga, Ontario. He played on the Erin Mills soccer team, and attended Port Credit Secondary School in Mississauga, Ontario.

== Career ==
Schmid is known for his starring role as 470-year-old vampire Henry Fitzroy on Lifetime's supernatural drama series Blood Ties, and for his recurring role as Aidan Waite's vampire progeny Henry on the Syfy series Being Human. He also starred as Robert Morehouse in the BBC America drama series Copper.

He has appeared in several films, such as The Covenant, A History of Violence, The Sisterhood of the Traveling Pants, The Pacifier, and Zerophilia. He is also recognizable for playing the love interest of Raven-Symoné's character, Galleria, in Disney Channel's The Cheetah Girls.

In October 2018, it was announced that Schmid was cast in the main role of Moses on the Netflix science fiction miniseries The I-Land. The miniseries was released on September 12, 2019.

In January 2021, Schmid was added to the cast of the ABC drama Big Sky as recurring character John Wayne Kleinsasser.

In 2024, Schmid portrayed Colin Strickland in the Lifetime film Yoga Teacher Killer: The Kaitlin Armstrong Story which was based on the Murder of Moriah Wilson.

== Personal life ==
Kyle and his now wife Caity Lotz announced their relationship on the July 4, 2021 through an Instagram post, the two were set up by friends in late 2020. In May 2022, via his Instagram profile, Schmid announced that he and Caity were engaged. The two married in 2023 in a ceremony in Colombia. In September 2024, they announced the birth of their daughter. And In February 2026, Lotz announced on her Instagram that they welcomed their son.

== Filmography ==
=== Film ===
Year	Title	Role	Notes
1996	The Awakening	Boy	Short
1996	Virus	Sick Boy	
2003	Fast Food High	Brad	
2005	The Pacifier	Scott	
2005	A History of Violence	Bobby Singer	
2005	The Sisterhood of the Traveling Pants	Paul Rodman	
2005	Zerophilia	Max	
2006	The Covenant	Aaron Abbot	
2008	Mookie's Law	Hank Brody	Short
2008	Joy Ride 2: Dead Ahead	Nick "Nik" Parker	Direct to video
2009	The Thaw	Federico Fulce	
2009	Fear Island	Tyler Campbell	Direct to video
2010	GravyTrain	Lance Dancaster	
2012	Dead Before Dawn	Patrick Bishop	
2014	Saul: The Journey to Damascus	Saul	
2014	Dark Hearts	Colson	
2015	88	Aster	
2019	10 Minutes Gone	Griffin	
2019	If Not Now, When?	Max	
2021	The Last Victim	Bull	
TBA	The Test	Xander	

=== Television ===
Year	Title	Role	Notes
1999	I Was a Sixth Grade Alien	Jordan Lynch	Recurring role
2000	Alley Cats Strike	Alex Thompson	TV film
2000	The Sandy Bottom Orchestra	Scott Miller	TV film
2001	The Zack Files	Jason	Episode: "Gone"
2001	What Girls Learn	Jamie Sanders	TV film
2001	Degrassi: The Next Generation	NAK Reporter	Episode: "Parents' Day"
2003	Odyssey 5	Zack Ambrose	2 episodes
2003	The Blobheads	Elan Stephan	Episode: "Nana"
2003	The Cheetah Girls	Derek	TV film
2003	Sex and the Single Mom	Chad	TV film
2005	Strange Days at Blake Holsey High	Blake Holsey	Episode: "Past"
2005	Cyber Seduction: His Secret Life	Timmy	Television film
2005	Missing	Xavier Redman	Episode: "Last Night"
2005	Beautiful People	Evan Frasier	Recurring role
2006	Death Row	Keith	TV film
2007	CSI: Miami	Andrew Hillman	Episode: "Bang, Bang, Your Debt"
2007	Blood Ties	Henry Fitzroy	Main role
2008	Smallville	Sebastian Kane	Episode: "Identity"
2011	Three Inches	Brandon Hamilton	Television film
2012	Arrow	Kyle Reston / Ace	Episode: "Legacies"
2012–2013	Copper	Robert Morehouse	Main role
2012–2014	Being Human	Henry Durham	Recurring role
2014	Lost Girl	Rainer / The Wanderer	Recurring role
2015	Motive	Derek Caster	Episode: "6 Months Later"
2016	CSI: Cyber	Reaper	"The Walking Dead"
2017–2018	Six	Alex Caulder	Main role
2018	Hell's Kitchen	Himself	Blue guest diner; Episode: "A Fond Farewell"
2019	Patsy & Loretta	Charlie Dick	TV film; main role
2019	The I-Land	Moses	Main role
2021	Big Sky	John Wayne Kleinsasser	Recurring role
2023	The Rookie	Detective Noah Foster	Guest role
2023	Accused	Shaggy	1 episode
2024	Yoga Teacher Killer: The Kaitlin Armstrong Story	Colin Strickland	Television film
2024–present	NCIS: Origins	Mike Franks	Main role; 36+ episodes

== Awards ==
Year	Award	Category	Work nominated	Result
2001	Young Artist Award	Best Performance in a TV Movie (Drama) - Supporting Young Actor	The Sandy Bottom Orchestra	Nominated
2015	Canadian Screen Awards	Best Performance by an Actor in a Leading Role in a Dramatic Program or Mini-Series	Saul: The Journey to Damascus	Nominated
