= Ainara Elbusto =

Spanish cyclist

Personal information
- Full name: Ainara Elbusto Arteaga
- Born: 10 September 1992 (age 34) Zurucuáin, Valle de Yerri (Navarra)

Cycling career
- Sport: Cycling
- Discipline: Road
- Role: Rider

Amateur teams
- 2016: Caispe–Conor–WRC
- 2017: Bolivia Femenino
- 2018: DC Ride–Vektor
- 2020: Casa Dorada Women Cycling

Professional teams
- 2015: Bizkaia–Durango
- 2018–2019: Bizkaia Durango–Euskadi Murias
- 2020–: Cronos–Casa Dorada

Ainara Elbusto Arteaga (born 10 September 1992) is a former professional Spanish racing cyclist, who specialises in criteriums and won most of the Red Hook Crit series. Her professional debut was in 2010 for the Reyno de Navarra road cycling team.

She rode for UCI Women's Continental Team Burgos Alimenta Women Cycling Sport.
