= Don McBrearty =

Canadian film director

- Born: Canada
- Occupation: Film director
- Notable work: Sex and the Single Mom

Don McBrearty is a Canadian film director.

== Career ==
In 2003 McBrearty directed the made for television drama film Sex and the Single Mom. It tells the story of Jess Gradwell (Gail O'Grady), a single and overly concerned mother of a 15-year-old girl, Sara (Danielle Panabaker). She becomes even more over protective when Sara tells her about thinking of having sex with her new boyfriend. The things between Sara and Jess start to change when Jess begins an affair with a newly single doctor.

He directed the sequel to Sex and the Single Mom, More Sex and the Single Mom, released in 2005 with O'Grady reprising her role as Jess. The film focuses on Jess's life as a mother of a teenage daughter and a three-year-old son, as well as her increasingly complicated love and sex life. In an interview with The Tuscaloosa News, O'Grady admitted that she had been "pleasantly surprised" when she was informed that there would be a sequel, and stated that the ending of the second film left the door open for future sequels.

== Filmography ==
Film

Year	Film	Notes
1983	American Nightmare	
1983	Boys and Girls	Short film
1984	Coming Out Alive	
1995	Butterbox Babies	

TV series

Year	Title	Notes
1986	Ray Bradbury Theatre	
1992	Road to Avonlea	Episodes "The Quarantine at Alexander Abraham's", "The Materializing of Duncan MacTavish", "The Witch of Avonlea", "A Mother's Love", "When She Was Bad, She Was Horrid, Pts. I and II", "After the Honeymoon", "Felicity's Perfect Beau", "Tug of War", "Boys Will Be Boys", "Heirs and Graces", "Home Movie", "Memento Mori"
1999	Wind at My Back	episodes "The Summer Plague", "Marriage of True Minds", "The Wild Blue Yonder", "Remembrance Day", "Marathon"
2001	Blue Murder	episodes "Spankdaddy", "Family Man"
2006	October 1970	Miniseries
2007	Heartland	episodes "Coming Together", "Nothing Endures", "Come What May", "One Trick Pony"
2008	Murdoch Mysteries	episodes "Still Waters", "Let Loose the Dogs", "Til Death Do Us Part", "Elementary, My Dear Murdoch"
2009	Wild Roses	episodes "Love and Loss", "Oil and Water"

== Filmography ==
Year	Film	Notes
1987	A Child's Christmas in Wales	
1994	Race to Freedom: The Story of the Underground Railroad	
1997	Newton: A Tale of Two Isaacs	
2002	The Interrogation of Michael Crowe	
2003	Sex and the Single Mom	
2005	More Sex and the Single Mom	
2007	Luna: Spirit of the Whale	
2008	Accidental Friendship	
2016	Valentine Ever After	
