= Tanya Huff bibliography =

This is a list of works by Canadian science fiction and fantasy writer Tanya Huff.

== Bibliography ==
=== Wizard Crystal of the Grove series ===
1. Child of the Grove (1988)
2. The Last Wizard (1989)
  Wizard of the Grove (1999) (Omnibus edition of Child of the Grove and The Last Wizard) (Illustrated by Anne Yvonne Gilbert)

=== Blood series ===
This series pairs a detective with a vampire. The first book introduces Victoria "Vicki" Nelson, a former police officer with failing eyesight due to Retinitis Pigmentosa and Henry Fitzroy, a vampire and writer of historical romances—which is natural for him as he was Henry FitzRoy, 1st Duke of Richmond and Somerset, illegitimate son of Henry VIII before he was seduced by a vampire. She is known to her police colleagues as "Victory Nelson" for her successful record of investigations; her mother calls her by her legal given name, "Victoria". Henry's protégé, Tony, is also introduced, as well as Vicki's hard-boiled former partner on the police force, Mike Celluci. Vicki's failing eyesight disqualified her from street work and she resigned rather than take a desk job, and, at the start of the first book, is working as a private detective. Together Vicki and Henry stand against a number of supernatural threats. The series is set in Canada, mainly in Toronto, Ontario, London, Ontario and Vancouver, British Columbia. It uses familiar landmarks, down to Tony's home on "Neal Avenue" being recognizably Nealon Avenue north of Danforth Avenue.

The series was adapted for City under the title Blood Ties and also aired on the Lifetime channel in the US. In the TV show, Tony's character was omitted with the idea that in the future another series might centre around him.

1. Blood Price (1991)
2. Blood Trail (1992)
3. Blood Lines (1992)
4. Blood Pact (1993)
5. Blood Debt (1997)
6. Blood Bank – a short story collection

Omnibus editions

1. Huff, Tanya (2006). The Blood Books, Volume I (Omnibus edition of Blood Price and Blood Trail) paperback. ISBN 0-7564-0387-1.
2. Huff, Tanya (2006). The Blood Books, Volume II (Omnibus edition of Blood Lines and Blood Pact) paperback. ISBN 0-7564-0388-X.
3. Huff, Tanya (2006-09-05). The Blood Books, Volume III (Omnibus edition of Blood Debt and Blood Bank) paperback. ISBN 0-7564-0392-8. (does not contain Tanya Huff's TV script for "Stone Cold" from Blood Ties that was added to the 2008 reissue of Blood Bank)

=== Smoke series ===
A follow-up to the Blood Books, featuring Tony Foster as the main character with his work in syndicated television on a show about a vampire detective.

1. Huff, Tanya (2004). Smoke and Shadows (hardcover 2004 ed.). ISBN 0-7564-0183-6. paperback ISBN 0-7564-0263-8.
2. Huff, Tanya (2005). Smoke and Mirrors (hardcover 2005 ed.). ISBN 0-7564-0262-X. paperback ISBN 0-7564-0348-0.
3. Huff, Tanya (2006). Smoke and Ashes (hardcover June 2006 ed.). ISBN 0-7564-0347-2. paperback ISBN 978-0-7564-0415-4.

=== Quarters series ===
Describes a world where musicians (or bards) create magic and an invasion from a neighboring country threatens the land. Many of the bards travel to carry their magical skills, as well as news, throughout the kingdom. The first book focuses on a bard who happens to be the king's sister and who has been forbidden to have a child. When she finds herself pregnant after a wild night of passion with the duke of a border duchy, she fears reprisal. The second and third books focus on a brother-sister pair of assassins. The fourth book primarily takes place in a new land and continues the story of Bannon, the brother portion of the assassin pair from previous books.

1. Sing the Four Quarters (1994)
2. Fifth Quarter (1995)
3. No Quarter (1996)
4. The Quartered Sea (1999)
5. Three Quarters: A Quarters Collection (2016), a compendium of three short stories set in the same universe

=== Keeper's Chronicles ===
Claire is a Keeper, charged with keeping the fabric of the metaphysical universe together, who inadvertently finds herself in charge of a small hotel with a hole to Hell in the basement. Her sidekick is Austin, a large, elderly talking cat. Claire's love interest, Dean, is a man without magical powers, whom she finds working as a handyman at the hotel. She is also assisted by Jacques, a hedonistic but noble ghost. Claire's sister, Diana, plays a large part in the books as well. In the second book, Diana acquires a talking cat of her own, which was an angel until Diana helped it to reconfigure as a cat and which, like Austin, provides comic commentary and a partner in dialogue.

1. Summon the Keeper (1998) (Illustrated by Mark Hess)
2. The Second Summoning (2001)
3. Long Hot Summoning (2003)

=== Valor Confederation series ===
Staff Sergeant Torin Kerr's aim is to keep both her superiors and her company of space marines alive as they deal with lethal missions throughout the galaxy. According to Tanya Huff, An Ancient Peace is intended to be the start of a new Peacekeeper series.

A Confederation of Valor (2006-12-05) (Omnibus edition of Valor's Choice and The Better Part of Valor)

1. Valor's Choice (2000)
  SSgt Kerr is sent with a motley platoon of space marines to help induct a new member species into the Confederation.
2. The Better Part of Valor (2002)
  SSgt Kerr is sent with a scratch squad of select recon force marines to investigate an unknown alien spaceship
3. The Heart of Valor (2007)
  GySgt Kerr escorts a newly rehabilitated Major to the Marines combat training grounds for field exercises.
4. Valor's Trial (2008)
  GySgt Kerr fights her way out of an underground POW camp.
5. The Truth of Valor (hardcover 24 August 2010)
6. An Ancient Peace (Peacekeeper #1) (6 October 2015)
7. A Peace Divided (Peacekeeper #2) (6 June 2017)
8. The Privilege of Peace (Peacekeeper #3) (19 June 2018)

=== Enchantment Emporium ===
- The Enchantment Emporium (2009)
- The Wild Ways (2011) – an Enchantment Emporium sequel from Charlie's point of view
- The Future Falls (2014)

=== Other novels ===
- Gate of Darkness, Circle of Light (1989)
- The Fire's Stone (1990)
- Of Darkness, Light, and Fire (2001) (Omnibus edition of Gate of Darkness, Circle of Light and The Fire's Stone)
- Scholar of Decay (1995) a Ravenloft novel
- The Silvered (2012)
- Into the Broken Lands (2022)
- Direct Descendant (April 1, 2025) - nominated for the 2026 Aurora Award for Best Novel.

=== Short story collections ===
- What Ho, Magic! (Meisha Merlin, 1999)
- Relative Magic (Meisha Merlin, 2003)
- Stealing Magic (Edge Publishing, 2005)
- Finding Magic (ISFiC Press, 2007)
- February Thaw and Other Stories of Contemporary Fantasy (JABberwocky Literacy Agency, Inc, 2011)
- Swan's Braid & Other Tales of Tarizan (JABberwocky Literary Agency, 2013)
- Third Time Lucky: And Other Stories of the Most Powerful Wizard in the World (JABberwocky Literacy Agency, Inc, 2015)
- The Demon's Den and Other Tales of Valdemar (JABberwocky Literary Agency, Inc, 2018)

=== Short stories ===
- "Music Hath Charms" (in anthology Hotter Than Hell, 2008)
- "Quartered" (in anthology A Fantasy Medley 2, edited by Yanni Kuznia, 2012 and Three Quarters, 2016)

=== Interviews ===
- Anon. (December 2013). "Tanya Huff: Builder". Interviews. Locus. 71 (6): 6–7, 58.
