= An Ancient Peace =

2015 novel by Tanya Huff

- First edition
- Author: Tanya Huff
- Language: English
- Publication date: 2015

An Ancient Peace is a 2015 science fiction novel by Tanya Huff, published by the British publishing firm Titan Books with a cover made by cover artist Paul Youll. The novel follows the experience of former gunnery sergeant Torin Kerr, a spin-off character from the previous Confederation series. The novel is intended to be the first in a three book Peacekeeper series.

Reception of the novel was generally good. Publishers Weekly said the novel had "elaborate world-building that establishes the setting for the new series, and the mystery plot holds its own." Michelle Herbert of Fantasy Book Review found the novel generally good, describing Kerr as a "a conflicted protagonist just trying to find her own peace, but knows at this time she is best off helping other people." Night Owl Review called the novel a "Top Pick" describing the book set in a "well-conceptualized universe" allowing the reviewer to "enjoy the roller coaster ride of adventures".

== See also ==
- Tanya Huff bibliography
