= Brian Gross =

American actor (born 1976)

- Born: 1976 (age 48–49); Cedar Rapids, Iowa
- Occupation: Actor

Brian Gross (born 1976 in Cedar Rapids, Iowa) is an American actor. He starred in the 1998 TV series Wind on Water as Kelly Connolly and has also appeared in numerous films and TV movies.

Gross portrays Captain James T. Kirk from episode 9 in the fan-created series Star Trek: Phase II.

== Early life and education ==
Gross graduated from his high school in Iowa in 1995. He then went on to obtain his degree in International Business from Loyola Marymount University.

== Filmography ==
=== Film ===
- Girlfriend Killer (Lifetime movie) as Ryan (2017)
- Knifepoint (2011)
- Stem Cell (2009)
- Big Momma's House 2 (2006)
- 2001 Maniacs (2005)
- Jack Frost 2: Revenge of the Mutant Killer Snowman (2002)
- Sorority Boys (2002)
- Tiger Heart (1996)

=== Television ===
- Saving Grace
- NCIS
- NCIS: Los Angeles
- CSI: NY
- CSI: Miami
- Walker, Texas Ranger
- Touched by an Angel
- Psych
- Las Vegas
- 2 Broke Girls
- Cold Case
- Joey
- Bones
- Pacific Blue
- JAG
- Sabrina the Teenage Witch
- Buffy the Vampire Slayer
- Baywatch
- Hope Ranch
