= Hidden Palms =

- Genre: Teen drama
- Created by: Kevin Williamson
- Starring: Michael Cassidy; Taylor Handley; Amber Heard; Sharon Lawrence; D. W. Moffett; Gail O'Grady; Ellary Porterfield; Tessa Thompson
- Opening theme: "Blind" by Mega Bass
- Country of origin: United States
- Original language: English
- No. of seasons: 1
- No. of episodes: 8

Production
- Executive producers: Kevin Williamson; Scott Winant
- Running time: approx. 44 minutes
- Production companies: Lift Entertainment; Outerbanks Entertainment; Lionsgate Television

Original release
- Network: The CW
- Release: May 30 – July 4, 2007

Hidden Palms is an American teen drama television series that ran on The CW in the United States from May 30 until July 4, 2007. It was canceled after eight first-run episodes. The series, created by Kevin Williamson, portrays the fictional lives of a group of teenagers and their families residing in Palm Springs, California.

== Production ==
=== Origin ===
The series, produced by Lionsgate Television, began production in late 2006 with the tentative title Palm Springs. The pilot episode was subsequently leaked onto the Internet before the series premiered.

In early 2007, Hidden Palms was announced to begin on March 6, 2007, at 9:00 pm Eastern/8:00 pm Central on The CW, but this timeslot later became occupied by Pussycat Dolls Present: The Search for the Next Doll. The series eventually premiered on The CW on May 30, 2007 at 8:00 pm Eastern/7:00 pm Central. It was announced on June 12, 2007, that Hidden Palms would wrap up two weeks earlier on the CW, which would stop rebroadcasting it on Sundays.

=== Filming ===
Because of the high labor costs of filming in Palm Springs, California, Hidden Palms was actually filmed at a studio in Avondale, Arizona. In the promos, mountains are shown in many (if not most) clips. However, parts of the pilot episode were filmed in Palm Springs, including downtown Palm Springs.

=== Broadcast ===
Hidden Palms premiered on The CW in the United States on May 30, 2007, at 8:00 pm Eastern/7:00 pm Central. Hidden Palms also simultaneously premiered in Canada on City, whilst premiering later in other countries around the world, including Bulgaria on Fox Life on July 21, 2007, Thursday at 10:00 pm EET, Brazil and Latin America on the A&E Network, Hungary on Viasat3, Serbia on Fox televizija, Spain on Cuatro TV, Portugal on RTP1, Sweden on TV3, Italy on Raidue, Denmark on TV3, Norway on TV3, on Fox Life in Poland, on Prime in New Zealand and on Sky One the United Kingdom in September 2007, Go in South Africa. The Nine Network in Australia has acquired the rights to broadcast it.

In the Netherlands, the entire series was released on DVD by RCV Entertainment in the summer of 2009.

== Cast and characters ==
=== Main ===
- Michael Cassidy as Cliff Wiatt
- Taylor Handley as Johnny Miller
- Amber Heard as Greta Matthews, Johnny's girlfriend
- Sharon Lawrence as Tess Wiatt, Cliff's mother
- D. W. Moffett as Bob Hardy, Johnny's stepfather
- Gail O'Grady as Karen Miller-Hardy, Johnny's widowed mother
- Ellary Porterfield as Liza Witter
- Tessa Thompson as Nikki Barnes

=== Recurring ===
- Leslie Jordan as Jesse Jo
- J. D. Pardo as Edward "Eddie" Nolan
- J.R. Cacia as Travis Dean
- Valerie Cruz as Maria Nolan
- Kyle Secor as Alan 'Skip' Matthews

== Episodes ==
Hidden Palms was first slated to be a mid-season show and 13 episodes had been ordered. During production, the show's episode number was lowered to 8.

| No. | Title | Directed by | Written by | Original release date |
|---|---|---|---|---|
| 1 | "Pilot" | Scott Winant | Kevin Williamson | May 30, 2007 |
Johnny Miller was a happy, well-adjusted high school student with good grades and a room full of sports trophies until the terrible night a year ago that his father committed suicide. Unable to cope, he tried to drown his pain in alcohol and drugs. Now, fresh out of rehab, Johnny is struggling to deal with an uncertain future in the surreal glare of Palm Springs, where his mother, Karen, and her new husband, Bob have decided to make a new start. The lush oasis of Palm Springs, with its golf courses, country clubs and beautiful people, is an unsettling new environment for Johnny. He quickly discovers that this paradise isn't quite what it seems when he meets his next-door neighbors: Cliff, a handsome high school junior whose considerable charm can't quite hide his disturbing dark side; and Cliff's mother, Tess, a former Southern beauty queen with a taste for younger men. Johnny learns that his new neighborhood is consumed by a tragedy when Cliff reveals that his best friend, Eddie, who lived in Johnny's house, recently died under mysterious circumstances. Eddie's death seems to haunt everyone Johnny meets, especially Greta, a stunning young beauty who fascinates Johnny from the moment he lays eyes on her. Intriguing and secretive, Greta has been on her own since the death of her mother many years before. With her father always away on business, Greta has become a self-sufficient loner. She quickly realizes, however, that Johnny is a kindred soul; someone forced by tough circumstances to grow up too soon. Even though Greta is drawn to Johnny, she refuses to talk about Eddie's death. Another neighbor, Liza, a gifted but awkward high school student who conducts explosive science experiments in her garage, yet still manages to keep a close eye on everything that happens in the neighborhood. Liza and Johnny soon bond in their pursuit of the truth.
| 2 | "Ghosts" | Scott Winant | Kevin Williamson | June 6, 2007 |
While Johnny is trying hard to win the heart of Greta, Nikki, a beautiful girl Johnny dated when they were in rehab together, comes to Palm Springs. At a country club fundraiser, Nikki gets drunk and causes a scene, ruining Johnny's first date with Greta but catching Cliff's eye. Cliff dislikes Tess's latest boyfriend and schemes to get rid of him. Johnny learns Eddie's death was a suicide and receives a mysterious email of a video of Eddie.
| 3 | "Party Hardy" | John Kretchmer | Steve Blackman | June 13, 2007 |
Determined to find out who is sending him instant messages from Eddie, Johnny asks Greta questions about Eddie's death but she refuses to answer him, causing tension in their new relationship. Bob and Karen go out for a night at the country club with Tess and Travis, leaving Johnny alone to look after Nikki. However, after Johnny leaves her to mend things with Greta, a lonely Nikki calls some old friends and an impromptu party breaks out at the Hardy house, quickly escalating into a fist fight between Johnny and Cliff.
| 4 | "What Liza Beneath" | Unknown | Unknown | June 20, 2007 |
| 5 | "Mulligan" | Unknown | Unknown | June 20, 2007 |
| 6 | "Dangerous Liaisons" | Unknown | Unknown | June 27, 2007 |
Johnny confronts Greta about the bloody costume, Greta explains that she and Cliff went to see Eddie the night he died and discovered his body, which she then held. Cliff later disputes this story, saying that Greta arrived 15 minutes earlier, shifting Johnnys suspicions. Cliff however confronts Liza, whom he suspects to be involved, a thought he shares with Johnny. Cliff and Eddie's mom continue their affair, only to be discovered by Nikki, at Tess's birthday party. Finally the end of the episode reveals a connection between Skip (Greta's Dad) and Maria (Eddie's Mom) revealing he returned because she called him, ending with Maria commenting 'we have a problem.'
| 7 | "Stand by Your Woman" | Unknown | Bryan M. Holdman | June 27, 2007 |
| 8 | "Second Chances" | Perry Lang | Bryan M. Holdman and Dwayne Darian | July 4, 2007 |
The mystery deepens into who really killed Eddie. Johnny goes to Cliff for help in stealing Eddie's laptop from Mrs. Nolan's house. Cliff attempts to do it but is caught by her. Johnny starts to back off solving the mystery after he learns from Greta's dad he's hurting her. In the end, Liza goes to Mrs. Nolan's house to steal Eddie's laptop and finds her dead. Mrs. Nolan shot herself and in a suicide note, admits she was the one who killed Eddie. However, at the very end of the episode, Johnny gets an e-mail with a video possibly sent from Mrs. Nolan before she killed herself. In the video, it reveals that Eddie had learned that Greta's father was the man she had the affair with, and claimed that the two had been plotting to kill Greta's mother and had done so. The two try to explain that she had cancer, but Eddie doesn't listen, leaving the mystery of the death of Greta's mother unresolved. In the end of the video it is shown that Eddie was in possession of the gun that killed him^{*1}, and during a struggle, Greta's dad pushes the gun toward Eddie's head and the trigger is pulled. Afterwards, Greta's father yells at a distraught Maria, "You're gonna do exactly as I say! Oh, yeah! We're in this together!" as Johnny looks in shock and the episode ends.

=== Ratings ===
| # | Title | Air Date | Rating | Share | 18–49 | Viewers | Weekly Rank |
|---|---|---|---|---|---|---|---|
| 1 | Pilot | May 30 | 1.3 | 2 | 0.6/2 | 1.86 | # 83 |
| 2 | Ghosts | June 6 | 1.1 | 2 | 0.4/1 | 1.49 | # 89 |
| 3 | Party Hardy | June 13 | 1.0 | 2 | 0.5/2 | 1.37 | # 91 |
| 4 | What Liza Beneath | June 20 | 1.1 | 2 | 0.5/2 | 1.28 | # 93 |
| 5 | Mulligan | June 20 | 1.1 | 2 | 0.6/2 | 1.76 | # 88 |
| 6 | Dangerous Liaisons | June 27 | 0.9 | 2 | 0.5/2 | 1.41 | # 96 |
| 7 | Stand by Your Woman | June 27 | 0.8 | 1 | 0.6/2 | 1.39 | # 99 |
| 8 | Second Chances | July 4 | 0.7 | 1 | 0.3/1 | 1.17 | # 99 |

== Critical reception ==
As of June 2007, the series received mixed reviews. It had a composite score of 45% based on 22 reviews at Metacritic.

Linda Stasi of the New York Post called it "the best rich kid show to appear on TV since that other California show died." Diane Werts of Newsday said the show "is enough to make me forgive The CW's entire sorry first season".

Conversely, Mike Duffy of the Detroit Free Press said the show is "luridly derivative" and that "there's nothing remotely hip" about it. Charlie McCollum of the San Jose Mercury News said the show "spends far too much time exploring the whiny angst of the teens". Tom Shales of The Washington Post said of the show, "you're likely to find more fascinating figures and intriguing dramatis personae in the latest catalogue from J. Peterman."

=== Controversy ===
The show came under fire from the Parents Television Council, which called the pilot "cliché-ridden" and claimed the overall plot was inappropriate for its teenage target audience due to depictions of underage drinking, parental suicide and sex. The pilot and finale were named the most offensive television programming of the weeks of their respective broadcasts.
