= Every 9 Seconds =

- Written by: Adam Greenman
- Directed by: Kenneth Fink
- Starring: Gail O'Grady; Amy Pietz; Christopher Meloni
- Country of origin: United States
- Original language: English

Production
- Cinematography: Ken Kelsch
- Editor: Paul Dixon
- Running time: 96 minutes

Original release
- Network: NBC
- Release: October 12, 1997

Every 9 Seconds is a 1997 television film directed by Kenneth Fink. It stars former NYPD Blue co-star, Gail O'Grady, Amy Pietz, and former Law & Order: Special Victims Unit star, Christopher Meloni. The film debuted on NBC on October 12, 1997 at 9/8c. It occasionally re-airs on Lifetime as well as its sister channel Lifetime Movie Network.

== Background ==
The film's title refers to a statistic suggesting that in the United States, a woman is battered every nine seconds. Its October release coincided with National Domestic Violence Awareness Month, and NBC heavily promoted it as a means of bringing awareness to domestic violence and to the National Domestic Hot Line.

== Plot ==
Carrie Breiter (Amy Pietz) is a journalist who goes undercover as a crisis line worker. Her work connects her with Janet (O'Grady), an abused woman who calls the hotline trying to proclaim revenge against her abusive ex-husband, Richard (Christopher Meloni), and Missy, a teen who declines help from the crisis center and is attacked not long after by her abusive boyfriend. Richard, who had been jailed for domestic abuse, is released early and shows up at Janet's house, menacing her. Breiter, against colleagues' advice, determines to intervene and save Janet.

== Cast ==
- Gail O'Grady as Janet
- Amy Pietz as Carrie
- Christopher Meloni as Richard Sutherland
- Emily Hampshire as Missy
- Michael Riley as Ray
- Scott Speedman as Greg
- Sean McCann as Mike McConnell
- Mimi Kuzyk as Carol

== Critical reception ==
The film received mixed reviews. The Los Angeles Times called the plot "absurdly formulaic" and argued that the film cheapened its subject of domestic violence. The St. Louis Post-Dispatch, although also finding the film familiar and exploitative, wrote: "If it encourages women in an abusive relationship to seek help, or get out, it's certainly worth network air time." New York magazine praised the "first-rate performances" by its cast, particularly Christopher Meloni.
