= Walking Across Egypt =

1999 film directed by Arthur Allan Seidelman

- Theatrical release poster
- Directed by: Arthur Allan Seidelman
- Screenplay by: Paul Tamasy
- Based on: Walking Across Egypt by Clyde Edgerton
- Produced by: Madeline Bell
- Starring: Ellen Burstyn; Jonathan Taylor Thomas; Mark Hamill; Edward Herrmann; Dana Ivey; Harve Presnell; Gwen Verdon with Gail O'Grady and Judge Reinhold
- Cinematography: Amelia Vincent
- Edited by: Bert Glatstein; Jonathan P. Shaw
- Music by: Marco Beltrami
- Production company: Mitchum Entertainment
- Distributed by: Keystone Entertainment
- Release date: December 17, 1999 (United States)
- Running time: 100 minutes
- Country: United States
- Language: English
- Budget: $4.5 million

Walking Across Egypt is a 1999 American coming-of-age comedy-drama film directed by Arthur Allan Seidelman and written by Paul Tamasy, based on Clyde Edgerton's novel of the same name. The film stars Ellen Burstyn, Jonathan Taylor Thomas, Mark Hamill, Gail O'Grady, Judge Reinhold, and Pat Corley.

The film is set in the Deep South. An old woman feels lonely after her children move out. She takes an interest in an incarcerated juvenile delinquent, and tries to convert him to Christianity. She feels that religion will provide him with a direction in his life.

== Plot ==
The film follows the life of Mattie Rigsbee (Burstyn), an elderly woman who believes in strong religious convictions. The film explores the lonely qualities of life for senior citizens after their children leave as adults. Reinhold and O'Grady play Mattie's children, who live in a town of the Deep South.

Mattie soon finds a likable friend in the local dogcatcher, Lamar Benfield (Hamill). Through this relationship, she meets the dogcatcher's nephew, a troubled juvenile delinquent orphan, Wesley (Taylor Thomas), currently serving time in juvenile detention for a recent car theft. Mattie finds that this young man is missing direction and believes that with a little insight on Christianity, he can straighten up and fly right. In the end Mattie helped parole him. He begins to live his life the right way.

== Cast ==
- Ellen Burstyn as Mattie Rigsbee
- Jonathan Taylor Thomas as Wesley Benfield
- Mark Hamill as Lamar N. Benfield
- Pat Corley as Sheriff Tillman
- Edward Herrmann as Reverend Vernon
- Dana Ivey as Beatrice Vernon
- Harve Presnell as Finner
- Gwen Verdon as Alora
- Gail O'Grady as Elaine Rigsbee
- Judge Reinhold as Robert Rigsbee

== Production ==
Walking Across Egypt was filmed in the Florida cities of: Ocoee (including the Ocoee Christian Church), Clermont, Windermere, Orlando, and St. Cloud.

== Reception ==
Robert Koehler from Variety said of the film, "The best in forgiving Christian values is at the heart of well-intentioned but weakly conceived Walking Across Egypt. By far, the most distinguishing factor is Ellen Burstyn's independent-minded Southern widower Mattie,[...] but that won't be enough to stop this from going directly to family-oriented cable." Despite this, the review aggregator website Rotten Tomatoes has given it an 89% according to audience ratings.
