= Murder of Moriah Wilson =

2022 shooting in Austin, Texas, US

- Wilson in 2021
- Location: Austin, Texas, U.S.
- Date: May 11, 2022; 4 years ago
- Attack type: Murder by shooting
- Weapon: SIG Sauer P365
- Victim: Moriah Wilson
- Perpetrator: Kaitlin Armstrong
- Motive: Romantic jealousy
- Criminal information
- Status: Convicted
- Conviction: First-degree murder
- Criminal charges: First-degree murder Misuse of passport
- Penalty: 90 years in prison (eligible for parole after 30 years)

Details
- Imprisoned at: Dr. Lane Murray Unit

On May 11, 2022, Anna Moriah "Mo" Wilson, a 25‑year‑old American professional cyclist, was fatally shot at a friend's residence in Austin, Texas. Investigators identified Kaitlin Marie Armstrong as the suspect after surveillance footage placed her near the scene and evidence linked her to the murder.

According to police and prosecutors, Armstrong's actions were motivated by jealousy related to Wilson's prior romantic involvement with Colin Strickland, with whom Armstrong had been in an on‑and‑off relationship. After being questioned by police, she fled the United States using her sister's passport and remained at large for 43 days before being located and arrested in Costa Rica, where she had altered her appearance and used multiple aliases.

Armstrong was extradited to Texas and pleaded not guilty. Her trial began in October 2023, and on November 16, 2023, she was found guilty of murder. She was sentenced to 90 years in prison, with eligibility for parole after 30 years, and is incarcerated at the Dr. Lane Murray Unit.

== Background ==
=== Victim ===
Anna Moriah Wilson was born on May 18, 1996, in Littleton, New Hampshire, to Karen (née Cronin) and Eric Wilson. She had one sibling, Matthew. She grew up in Kirby, Vermont. Wilson graduated from Burke Mountain Academy in 2014 and from Dartmouth College in 2019 with a Bachelor of Engineering (BE).

Raised in an athletic family, Wilson developed an early interest in cycling. She was a nationally ranked junior skier before shifting her focus to gravel cycling. Prior to becoming a full‑time professional cyclist, she worked as a demand planner for Specialized.

=== Perpetrator ===
Kaitlin Armstrong (born November 21, 1987) grew up in Livonia, Michigan. She graduated from Stevenson High School in 2005, then attended Schoolcraft College and Eastern Michigan University. Prior to her criminal conviction, she had been described as a yoga teacher and a licensed realtor.

Armstrong was in a relationship with professional cyclist Colin Strickland. They briefly separated in the fall of 2021, after which Strickland met Wilson and began a short romantic relationship with her. Armstrong and Strickland later reconciled and resumed their relationship.

== Death and investigation ==
On May 11, 2022, Wilson, age 25, was found dead from multiple gunshot wounds "shortly before 10 p.m." at a friend's residence in Austin, Texas, where she had been staying while preparing to compete in a race in Hico. Earlier that day, she had met Strickland for a swim at Deep Eddy Pool and had dinner afterwards. Strickland denied entering the residence after dropping Wilson off and was ruled out as a suspect following a police investigation.

An autopsy determined that Wilson's death was a homicide, with three gunshot wounds – two to the head and one to the chest – that occurred "after she was already lying supine on the floor," according to a search warrant. Police identified the 34-year-old Armstrong as a person of interest after surveillance footage showed her black Jeep Grand Cherokee arriving at the residence shortly before the killing. She was taken into custody on an outstanding misdemeanor theft warrant. Armstrong made no statement when questioned about the video evidence; investigators noted that she "turned her head and rolled her eyes in an angry manner" when asked about Wilson's contact with Strickland. She was released due to a technicality involving discrepancies between her date of birth in police records and the one listed on the warrant.

Police examined Wilson's phone and concluded that she had been romantically involved with Strickland while he was still dating Armstrong. Strickland initially denied knowing Wilson when first interviewed, but later acknowledged the relationship and admitted to concealing his communications with her from Armstrong, including deleting messages and saving Wilson's number under a pseudonym. According to an anonymous tipster, Armstrong had become aware of the relationship and expressed a desire to kill Wilson, stating that she "had either recently purchased a firearm or was going to." Strickland told investigators he had purchased two handguns for himself and Armstrong. Through a search warrant, police recovered two firearms from the home he shared with her. A spent shell casing from one of the weapons, a SIG Sauer P365 registered to Armstrong, showed a "significant" match to a casing found at the crime scene. The warrant also stated that she had visited a shooting range with her sister, Christine, "to learn how to use a firearm". On May 17, an arrest warrant for first-degree murder was issued for Armstrong.

== Arrest, trial and conviction ==
Armstrong used her sister's passport to fly to Costa Rica. While there, she assumed multiple false identities and altered her appearance through plastic surgery. U.S. Marshals located her after placing a Facebook advertisement seeking a yoga instructor. After 43 days at large, she was apprehended at a hostel in Santa Teresa, Costa Rica, on June 29, 2022. At a press conference announcing her capture, U.S. Marshals stated that Armstrong had fled to Costa Rica and sought opportunities to teach yoga under various aliases. They noted that her appearance had changed significantly; her hair had been dyed and cut short, her nose was bandaged, and there was discoloration around her eyes, which she reportedly attributed to a surfboarding accident.

Armstrong was arraigned on July 21, 2022, and pleaded not guilty to the murder charge. She was held on a $3.5 million bond in the Travis County Jail. After delays, the case proceeded to trial on October 30, 2023. Armstrong had unsuccessfully sought to suppress evidence from her custodial interrogation with the Austin Police Department, arguing that it was illegally obtained because she had not been given a Miranda warning. A federal charge of unlawful flight to avoid prosecution was provisionally dismissed; legal experts described the dismissal as "routine" noting her constitutional right to a speedy trial.

On October 12, 2023, Armstrong escaped from officers who had escorted her to a medical appointment outside the jail. She was recaptured after a brief chase. She was charged with escape causing bodily injury, though the charge was later dropped.

On November 16, 2023, following a trial before Judge Brenda Kennedy, Armstrong was found guilty of murder. She was sentenced to 90 years in prison, with eligibility for parole after 30 years. Armstrong filed an appeal, which was denied. She is incarcerated at the Dr. Lane Murray Unit.

== Civil lawsuit ==
On May 6, 2024, Wilson's parents filed a civil wrongful death lawsuit against Armstrong, seeking $1 million in damages, stating that they will "ultimately ask that a jury determine the full value and extent of damages." The compensation sought included burial and funeral expenses, as well as emotional damages resulting from Wilson's death. The lawsuit also aimed to prevent Armstrong from profiting financially from the crime. On June 17, 2024, a judge ordered Armstrong to pay $15 million to the Wilson family.

Three days after the wrongful death lawsuit was filed, Armstrong emptied her bank account and transferred her assets to her mother, sister, and Strickland, according to a nationwide asset search. In July 2024, Wilson's family filed an additional lawsuit against Armstrong's relatives and Strickland, alleging fraudulent transfer.

== In popular media ==
On June 15, 2024, Lifetime released a television film titled Yoga Teacher Killer: The Kaitlin Armstrong Story as part of its "Ripped from the Headlines" series. The film stars Caity Lotz as Kaitlin Armstrong, Kyle Schmid as Colin Strickland, and Larissa Dias as Moriah Wilson.

In March 2026, The Truth and Tragedy of Moriah Wilson, a documentary about Wilson's life and murder, premiered at South by Southwest (SXSW) and was released on Netflix on April 3, 2026. The film was directed by American filmmaker Marina Zenovich and produced by Academy Award-winner Evan Hayes. The New York Times gave the documentary an unfavorable review, describing it as "exploitative."

The family of Moriah Wilson created the Moriah Wilson Foundation.

== See also ==
- Murder of Sarah Ludemann, a 2009 murder on a similar love triangle and jealousy
