= Taylor Handley =

American actor (born 1984)

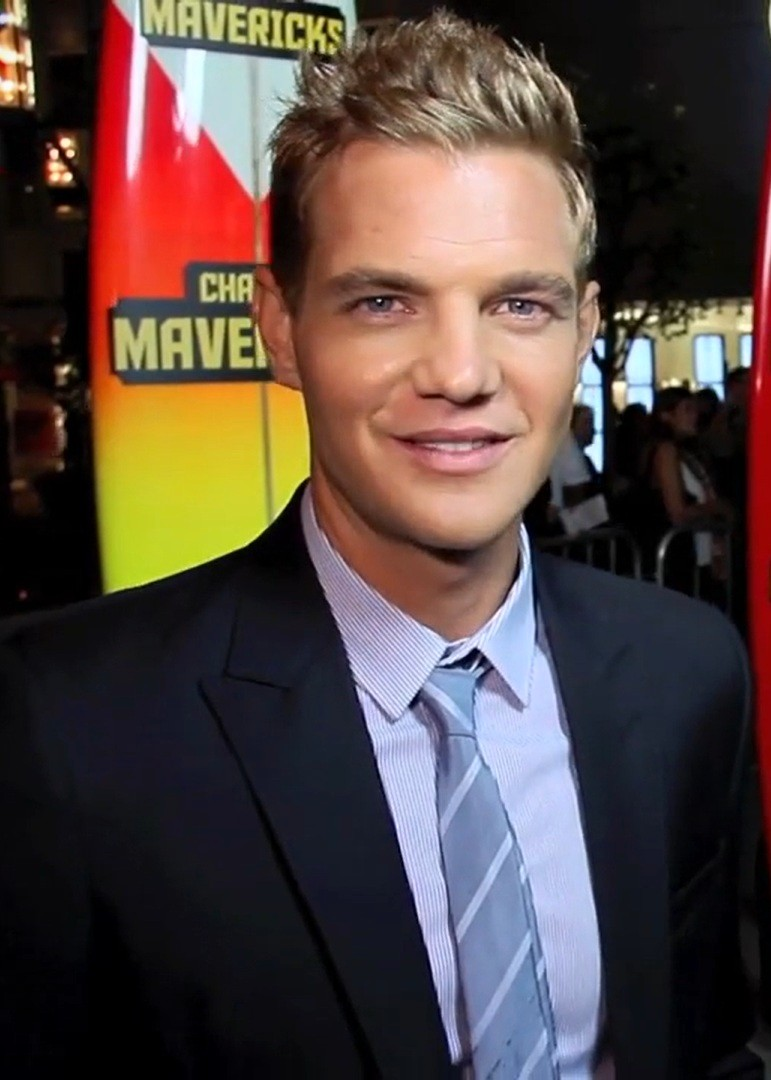
- Handley in 2012
- Born: Taylor Laurence Handley; June 1, 1984 (age 42); Santa Barbara, California, U.S.
- Occupation: Actor
- Years active: 1998–present
- Spouse: Audra Lynn Handley
- Children: 1

Taylor Laurence Handley (born June 1, 1984) is an American actor, best known for portraying Rory Buck in Jack Frost and Kyle McLusky in Mayor of Kingstown.

== Early life ==
Handley grew up in Santa Barbara, California. With his parents driving him the 90 miles to Los Angeles for auditions and jobs, he worked as a child actor as a young teenager. At age 18, after graduating from Santa Barbara High School, he moved to Santa Monica and attended Santa Monica City College while continuing to seek acting opportunities.

== Career ==
In 1998, Handley played Rory Buck in the movie Jack Frost. In 2000, Handley starred in the Disney Channel Original Movie, Phantom of the Megaplex. Handley appeared in three episodes during the last season of Dawson's Creek and guest starred during an episode of CSI: Crime Scene Investigation. In 2003 and 2004, Handley appeared as Oliver Trask in six episodes of the first season of The O.C. In 2005, he starred in Zerophilia, a speculative-fiction romantic comedy exploring gender identity. In 2006, Handley appeared in two films: The Standard and The Texas Chainsaw Massacre: The Beginning. Handley's next film, September Dawn, was released to theaters on August 24, 2007.

Also in 2007, Handley starred as Johnny Miller in the short-lived series Hidden Palms, on The CW.

On April 9, 2009, he guest-starred in the pilot of Southland, playing Wade. He returned as Wade in the second episode of the second season.

Handley also co-starred alongside Dennis Quaid in the series Vegas, playing the character Dixon Lamb.

In 2013, he appeared in the commercial "Greatness Awaits" for the PlayStation 4 console, and in 2020 in the State Farm Insurance commercial "Not the One", in which he played a rejected contestant from a Bachelorette-esque program who is comforted by "Jake from State Farm".

== Filmography ==
=== Film ===
Year	Title	Role	Notes
1998	Jack Frost	Rory Buck	
2005	Zerophilia	Luke	
2006	The Standard	Ryan	
2006	The Texas Chainsaw Massacre: The Beginning	Dean Hill	
2007	September Dawn	Micah Samuelson	
2010	Skateland	Kenny Crawford	
2011	Battle: Los Angeles	Lance Corporal Corey Simmons	
2011	Sink Into You	John D.	Short
2012	Chasing Mavericks	Sonny	
2013	Channeling	Wyatt Maddox	
2013	Greatness Awaits		Short
2013	Mentryville	Dean	
2015	Toxin	Dean	
2018	Bird Box	Jason	
2024	Outbreak	John Gibson	

=== Television ===
Year	Title	Role	Notes
1999	Sons of Thunder	Joseph McNulty	Episode: "Fighting Back"
1999	Odd Man Out	Roberto	Episode: "Punch Line"
2000	Phantom of the Megaplex	Pete Riley	TV movie
2001	Go Fish	Hazard	Main role; 5 episodes
2002	Frasier	Trent	Episode: "Juvenilla"
2002	NYPD Blue	Nick Bowen	Episode: "Oh, Mama!"
2002	Touched By An Angel	Ricky Collette	Episode: "A Rock and a Hard Place"
2002	CSI: Crime Scene Investigation	Max Newman	Episode: "Let the Seller Beware"
2003	Becker	Brad	Episode: "Bad to the Bone"
2003	Dawson's Creek	Patrick	3 episodes
2003	Then Came Jones		TV Movie
2003–2004	The O.C.	Oliver Trask	6 episodes
2005	Blind Justice	Tyler Mills	Episode: "Under the Gun"
2005	Cold Case	Steve Jablonski	Episode: "One Night"
2006	In from the Night	Bobby	TV Movie
2007	CSI: Miami	Travis Peck	Episode: "Born to Kill"
2007	Hidden Palms	Johnny Miller	8 episodes
2009	Numb3rs	James Arthur	Episode: "Animal Rites"
2009	Southland	Wade	2 episodes
2009	The Cleaner	Travis Nathanson	Episode: "The Turtle & The Butterfly"
2010	CSI: NY	Billy Travis	Episode: "Damned If You Do"
2011	The Glades	Trey Lancer	Episode: "Moonlighting"
2011	Law & Order: LA	Eric Kentner	Episode: "Westwood"
2012	Vegas	Dixon Lamb	21 episodes
2013	Horizon	George Howl	TV movie
2016	Scorpion	Cody Decker	2 episodes
2017	APB	Officer Roderick Brandt	
2018	Imposters	Fluke	Episode: "Fillion Bollar King"
2019	Proven Innocent	Ronnie Peterson	Episode: "Cross to Bear"
2019	The I-Land	Jordan	Mini series; 1 episode
2019	Hawaii Five-O	Agent Coen	Episode: "Ka 'i'o"
2021	Animal Kingdom	Liam	2 episodes
2021–Present	Mayor of Kingstown	Kyle McLusky	Main cast
2023	Magnum P.I.	Tate Walker	Episode: "Consciousness of Guilt"
2024	Griselda	Detective Bill	Mini series; 2 episodes
2026	The Pitt	Paul Hamler	7 episodes

=== Producer ===
- 2011 Sink Into You
