= Cursed (2000 TV series) =

American sitcom television series

- Also known as: The Weber Show
- Created by: Mitchel Katlin; Nat Bernstein
- Starring: Steven Weber; Chris Elliott; Wendell Pierce; Amy Pietz; Paula Marshall
- Theme music composer: Brad Segal; Nic Tenbroek
- Opening theme: "Miss Fortune" performed by Liz Phair
- Country of origin: United States
- Original language: English
- No. of seasons: 1
- No. of episodes: 17 (2 unaired)

Production
- Executive producers: Mitchel Katlin; Nat Bernstein; Adam Chase; James Burrows; Ira Ungerleider; Steven Weber
- Producer: Patricia Fass Palmer
- Camera setup: Multi-camera
- Running time: 30 minutes
- Production companies: Artists Television Group; NBC Studios; Captain Shadow And Steve; Katlin/Bernstein Productions

Original release
- Network: NBC
- Release: October 26, 2000 – April 26, 2001

Cursed, later renamed The Weber Show, is an American sitcom television series that ran on NBC from October 26, 2000 to April 26, 2001. It stars Steven Weber, Amy Pietz, Wendell Pierce, and Chris Elliott.

== Overview ==
The show is notable for having an abrupt title change in the middle of its first season. The initial premise was that its protagonist (Weber) had been cursed by a first date and thus constantly encountered bad luck. The show failed to find an audience, and so midway through the season the entire "bad luck" angle was abruptly dropped. The show was revamped as a more traditional sitcom and renamed The Weber Show. The show still struggled and was canceled at the end of the season, leaving a cliffhanger unresolved. The show's theme song was written and performed by Liz Phair.

== Cast ==
- Steven Weber as Jack Nagle
- Amy Pietz as Melissa Taylor
- Chris Elliott as Larry Heckman
- Wendell Pierce as Wendell Simms
- Paula Marshall as Katie

== Recurring ==
- John O'Hurley as Mr. Bill Erlicht
- Rena Sofer as Dawn Cheswick

== Guest stars ==
- Lisa Darr as Angela Nichalos
- Travis Wester as Wayne
- Kate Walsh as Stace
- Elaine Hendrix as Jamie
- Charlton Heston as Himself
- Heidi Klum as Annika
- Anthony Edwards as Ricky
- Andrea Bendewald as Lucy
- Lori Loughlin as Natalie
- Whoopi Goldberg as Herself
- Paul Gleason as Principal Squires
- Simon Helberg as Andy Tinker
- Spencer Garrett as Jim
- Jane Lynch as Carla
- Richard Libertini as Dr. Sal Weitzman

== Episodes ==
No.	Title	Directed by	Written by	Original release date	Prod. code	U.S. viewers (millions)
1	"Pilot"	James Burrows	Mitchel Katlin & Nat Bernstein	October 26, 2000	35–01000	17.85
A blind date puts a hex on Jack, who comes to believe that her spell may be working.
2	"...And Then He Gave Her Some Old Linguine"	Michael Lembeck	Phil Baker and Drew Vaupen	November 2, 2000	35–01003	18.42
Jack tries to win back Melissa.
3	"...And Then She Gave Him the Bird"	Michael Lembeck	Ellen Byron & Lissa Kapstrom	November 9, 2000	35–01004	15.48
Jack reveals a childhood accident that prompts Larry to void their friendship.
4	"...And Then He Had to Give a Thumbs Up"	Barnet Kellman	Michael Curtis	November 16, 2000	35–01005	18.35
Jack's injured thumb may hurt his chance at getting a promotion.
5	"...And Then He Looked at Wendell's Thing"	James Widdoes	Ellen Byron & Lissa Kapstrom	December 7, 2000	35–01006	14.78
Jack jeopardizes his friendship with Wendell when he peeks at his job evaluation.
6	"...And Then Larry Brought Charlton Heston Home"	Andrew Tsao	Mark J. Kunerth	December 14, 2000	35–01007	17.21
Charlton Heston is admitted to hospital with amnesia following an accident. Jack meets Katie. [NOTE: This is the first episode with the new title.]
7	"...And Then Wendell Wore Candy Stripes"	Barnet Kellman	Phil Baker & Drew Vaupen	January 4, 2001	35–01008	17.32
Jack becomes jealous when his lesbian friend begins hanging out with his ex-girlfriend.
8	"...And Then They Bought a Motorcycle with a Sidecar" "And Then Larry Motorized the Side Car"	James Widdoes	Kevin Rooney	January 11, 2001	35–01009	15.98
Jack and Larry restore a vintage motorcycle that has a sidecar.
9	"...And Then Jack Found Out"	Barnet Kellman	Michael Curtis	January 25, 2001	35–01010	15.06
Jack tries to woo his lesbian friend, Katie.
10	"...And Then Jack Forgot His Dream"	Dana DeVally Piazza	Michael Curtis	March 15, 2001	35–01011	16.24
Jack urges Larry's brother (Anthony Edwards) to give up his pursuit of rock stardom.
11	"...And Then They Tried to Make Some Rules"	Gail Mancuso	Gail Lerner & David Walpert	March 22, 2001	35–01012	14.61
An ex-girlfriend (Lori Loughlin) contacts Jack 15 years after dumping him.
12	"...And Then Sex Freaked Jack Out"	Craig Knizek	Mark J. Kunerth	March 29, 2001	35–01014	13.60
Intimacy with Katie leads to feelings of inadequacy, prompting Jack to improve his sexual prowess.
13	"...And Then Jack Became the Voice of the Cougars"	Dana DeVally Piazza	Mark J. Kunerth	April 5, 2001	35–01013	9.40
Jack bribes a high-school principal to allow him to play announcer for a baseball game.
14	"...And Then Jack Had Two Dates"	Barnet Kellman	Liz Astrof & Gail Lerner	April 19, 2001	35–01015	11.26
Jack is torn between Larry and Katie when each makes demands on his time.
15	"...And Then They Hoped for a Second Season" "...And Then Things Changed"	Gail Mancuso	Mark J. Kunerth & Peter Tibbals	April 26, 2001	35–01016	11.74
Jack must decide whether to commit to Katie after she is offered a job in New York.
16	"Jumpin' Jack's Rash" "...And Then He Got a Rash"	James Burrows	Phil Baker & Drew Vaupen	Unaired	35–01001	N/A
When Jack gets a rash, he decides to visit a different doctor, instead of Larry.
17	"Dog Eat Dog"	James Widdoes	Nat Bernstein & Mitchel Katlin	Unaired	35–01002	N/A
Jack gets a dog to impress a woman.
