= J. D. Pardo =

American actor

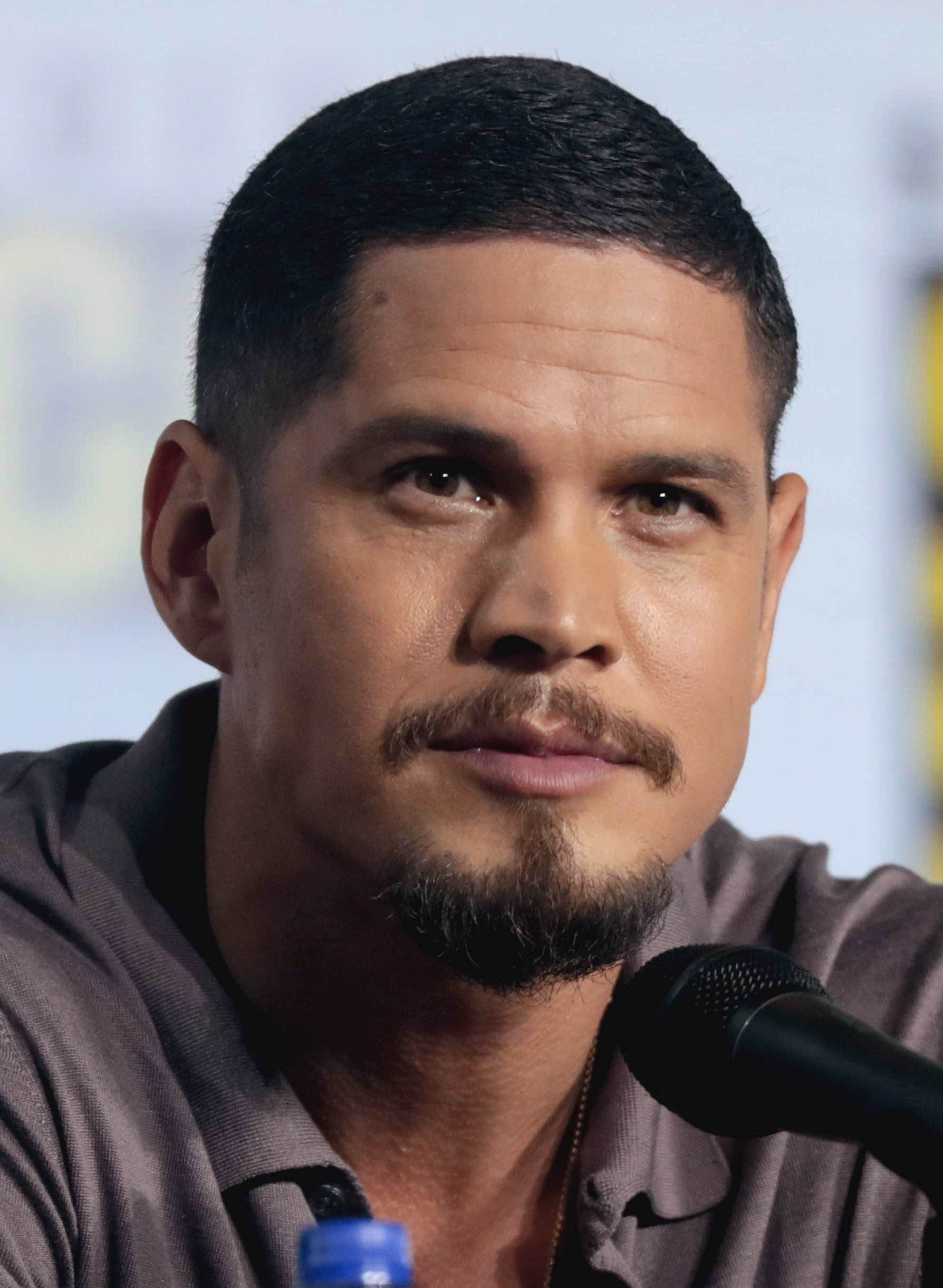
- Pardo in 2019
- Born: Jorge Daniel Pardo; September 7, 1980 (age 45); Los Angeles, California, U.S.
- Occupation: Actor
- Years active: 2001–present

Jorge Daniel Pardo (born September 7, 1980) is an American actor. He is best known for playing the lead role of Ezekiel "EZ" Reyes in the television series Mayans M.C. (2018–2023), as well as a young Jack Toretto in F9 (2021).

== Early life ==
Pardo was born in Los Angeles, California, to an Argentine father and a Salvadoran mother.

== Career ==
Pardo played Ezekiel "EZ" Reyes in FX's Mayans M.C. throughout the 50-episode run of the series. EZ began the series as a prospect in the fictional motorcycle club before working his way up to the title of "Presidente" (Spanish for president).

Pardo also played "Nate"/Jason in the NBC sci-fi series Revolution, co-starring Billy Burke. Previously he was best known for his role as Gwen Amber Rose Araujo in the Lifetime Network biopic A Girl Like Me: The Gwen Araujo Story. Pardo also had roles on FOX's Drive and The CW's Hidden Palms. Both series were cancelled after their respective first seasons. Pardo played Young Santiago in the film The Burning Plain (2008) starring opposite Jennifer Lawrence with Charlize Theron and Kim Basinger. He played the half-vampire Nahuel in the second half of Breaking Dawn, and a member of a drug cartel in Snitch. Pardo also starred in The CW TV series The Messengers that aired during the 2014–2015 season. In late 2023, he signed a deal with FXP to develop and produce television projects.

== Personal life ==
Pardo is a fan of the Kansas City Chiefs despite growing up in Los Angeles.

== Filmography ==
=== Film ===
Year	Film	Role	Notes
2004	¿Cuanto cuesta la admisión?	Alexei	Short film
2004	A Cinderella Story	Ryan Hanson	
2005	Havoc	Todd Rosenberg	
2005	Supercross	Chuy	
2008	The Burning Plain	Young Santiago	
2012	The Twilight Saga: Breaking Dawn – Part 2	Nahuel	
2013	Snitch	Benicio	
2021	F9	Jack Toretto	
2022	The Contractor	Eric	
2023	Hypnotic	Nicks	
2024	Road House	Dell	

=== Television ===
Year	Show	Role	Notes
2001	Titans	Nick	2 episodes
2001	My Wife and Kids	Boy #1	1 episode
2002	One on One	Posse Member	1 episode
2002	Hope Ranch	Ernesto Mendoza	Television film
2004	American Dreams	Pvt. Carlos Perez / Matt Perez	Recurring role, 11 episodes
2004–2005	Clubhouse	Jose Marquez	Main role, 10 episodes
2005	Veronica Mars	Rick	Episode: "Clash of the Tritons"
2006	CSI: Miami	Mario Pilar	Episode: “Silencer”
2006	The O.C.	Tattooed Surfer/Guy	3 episodes
2006	Standoff	Vin Leon	1 episode
2006	A Girl Like Me: The Gwen Araujo Story	Gwen Araujo	Television film
2007	Hidden Palms	Eddie Nolan	4 episodes
2007	Drive	Sean Salazar	Miniseries, 6 episodes
2010	90210	Dax	2 episodes
2010	Human Target	Brody Rivera	1 episode
2011	CSI: NY	Bobby Renton	Episode: “To What End?”
2012–2014	Revolution	"Nate Walker" / Jason Neville	Main role, 32 episodes
2014	Stalker	Oscar Ramirez	Recurring role, 6 episodes
2015	The Messengers	Raul Garcia	Main role, 13 episodes
2015	Blood & Oil	Dr. Alex White	2 episodes
2015–2016	East Los High	Jesus	Main role, 18 episodes
2016	Rush Hour	Hunter	1 episode
2018–2023	Mayans M.C.	Ezekiel "EZ" Reyes	Main role, 50 episodes Director (Episode: "I See the Black Light")
2018	S.W.A.T	Carlos	1 episode
2019	Tacoma FD	Lopez	1 episode
2022	The Terminal List	Tony Layun	Recurring role, 5 episodes
2024–present	High Potential	Tom	Recurring role, 5 episodes
2025	Untamed	Michael	2 episodes

== Awards ==
2007: Nominated for an Imagen Award for Best Actor - Television for: A Girl Like Me: The Gwen Araujo Story (2006) (TV)

2019: Nominated for an Imagen Award for Best Actor - Television for: Mayans M.C. (FX Networks; 20th Television and FX Productions)

2020: Nominated for an Imagen Award for Best Actor - Television for: Mayans M.C. (FX Networks; 20th Television and FX Productions)

2021: Won an Imagen Award for Best Actor – Television (Drama): JD Pardo, Mayans M.C. (FX Networks; 20th Television and FX Productions)
