= Blood Ties (TV series) =

- Genre: Occult detective fiction Police procedural Comedy drama Horror
- Created by: Series: Peter Mohan; Books: Tanya Huff
- Directed by: David Winning
- Starring: Christina Cox; Kyle Schmid; Dylan Neal; Gina Holden
- Opening theme: "Live Forever" by Tamara Rhodes
- Country of origin: Canada
- Original language: English
- No. of seasons: 2
- No. of episodes: 22

Production
- Producer: Peter Mohan
- Production locations: Toronto, Ontario; Vancouver, British Columbia
- Running time: 43 minutes

Original release
- Network: City (Canada); Space (Canada); Lifetime Television (United States)
- Release: March 11 – December 7, 2007

Blood Ties is a Canadian television series based on the Blood Books by Tanya Huff; the show was created by Peter Mohan. It is set in Toronto, Ontario, and features a 4-and-a-half century old vampire, Henry Fitzroy, assisting private investigator Vicki Nelson in dealing with crime committed via paranormal elements, a similar premise to an earlier series also set in Toronto, Forever Knight. It premiered in the United States on March 11, 2007, on Lifetime Television, and during fall of 2007 on City and Space in Canada. In May 2008, Lifetime declined to renew the series.

== Plot ==
Blood Ties, set in Toronto, Ontario, centres on Vicki Nelson (Christina Cox), a former Toronto Police Service officer who left the force to become a private investigator when her eyesight begins to degenerate from retinitis pigmentosa. Through her work she teams up with the 470-year-old vampire Henry Fitzroy, who happens to be the illegitimate son of Henry VIII. The mutual attraction between them is complicated by Vicki's relationship with former partner and lover Mike Celluci. In the beginning, he does not believe in the supernatural and thinks Vicki is losing her mind along with her eyesight. Also in the picture is Vicki's assistant Coreen, who was hired because of her knowledge of the occult and to keep her quiet about Henry. Coreen is thoroughly enamored of both the occult and Henry, which can get her into trouble.

== Cast ==
=== Main ===
- Christina Cox as Victoria "Vicki" Nelson
- Kyle Schmid as Henry Fitzroy
- Dylan Neal as Mike Celluci
- Gina Holden as Coreen Fennel

=== Recurring ===
- Françoise Yip as Kate Lam
- Nimet Kanji as Dr. Rajani Mohadevan
- Keith Dallas as Dave Graham
- Eileen Pedde as Allison Crowley
- Linda Sorenson as Dr. Betty Sagara

=== Guest stars ===
- Michael Eklund as Norman Bridewell
- Jody Racicot as Greg the doorman
- John Mann as Astaroth
- Juan Riedinger as Ian Reddick
- Mark Oliver as Demon
- Nickolas Baric as Goth Bartender
- Patricia Isaac as Salonera
- Monique Ganderton as Magaera
- Julian Sands as Javier Mendoza
- Steve Bacic as Paul 'Dirty' Deeds
- Kira Clavell as Chuntao Fang
- Laura Mennell as Christina
- Jody Thompson as Lexia
- Olivia Sonya Cheng as Wynter
- Danny Trejo as Pacha Kamaq

== Characters ==
Victoria "Vicki" Nelson
Former police officer, turned private investigator. After being diagnosed with retinitis pigmentosa, Vicki faced the hard choice of leaving Homicide Division in the police department and working a desk job or leaving the police force altogether. Despite strong protests from her partner and lover, Detective Mike Celluci, she decided to leave the force and open a private investigation firm.
Though her vision does prove to be a problem at times, Vicki refuses to let anyone treat her like she is disabled and continues to take risks with her life throughout the course of her investigations. As a result of leaving the force, her relationship with Celluci has become on-again/off-again. Meanwhile, her growing attraction to Henry only fuels the complications in her love life, putting her in the center of a supernatural love triangle.
Henry Fitzroy
(b. June 15, 1519 d. June 18, 1536 reborn June 19, 1536) Based on the historical character Henry FitzRoy, 1st Duke of Richmond and Somerset - the illegitimate son of Henry VIII of England, Henry Fitzroy chose love over familial duty and sacrificed his mortal life to remain forever with the woman he loved; Christina. Vampiric circumstances, however, prevented him from remaining with her and now, after 470 years of existence, he is living in Toronto as a graphic novelist (a.k.a. comic book artist)- "Art and literature have always been my passions. I finally found a medium where I could fully realize the both of them." His quiet, hidden life takes on a new twist when he collides with Vicki Nelson in an attempt to stop a man from bringing the demon Asteroth into the mortal world. As they work to solve this case, and subsequently other supernatural problems, Henry grows deeply attracted to Vicki's willful nature and exuberance for life, eventually falling for her. Though she seems to resist his advances, he continues to pursue her and, mostly due to his centuries of experience and knowledge of both sides of the supernatural, he becomes Vicki's partner and bodyguard.
Detective Mike Celluci
Vicki's former partner, as well as on/off lover, he was very much against her decision to leave the force. He and Vicki share many personality traits, which often results in arguments between the two. Yet despite (or perhaps because of) this they are firm friends, both going so far as to discuss their current cases. As straight as they come, and a "see it to believe it" kind of guy to boot, Mike often exhibits concern over the kind of cases Vicki seems willing to take on in her new career. He has trouble accepting Vicki's friendship and trust in Henry, even more so once he finds out what Henry is, often coming across as jealous. However, they have been known to work together on occasion - especially when it is Vicki who needs help.
Coreen Fennel
Coreen becomes known to Vicki during her first "unusual" case, hiring her to find out who killed her boyfriend. Once the case was over, she managed to insinuate herself into the position of Vicki's office assistant. Coreen appears to have extensive knowledge about the occult, and is certainly far more curious and accepting of it than any of the other characters. Because of this, she seems to have struck up a friendship with Dr. Sagara, a professor of the occult known to Henry, and the two can occasionally be seen working together on a case for Vicki. Coreen can at times serve as an emissary between Vicki and Mike, usually trying to get Vicki talking with him again. It was shown various times that she may have a crush on Henry, most prominently when first meeting him. However, when the two rarely work together, Coreen's lingering looks may suggest that she has a crush on him or it may be the way Henry naturally attracts women. This character does not appear in the books beyond the "client" role she originated in the first episode, and it has been suggested that she "replaced" the character of Tony. Several sources cite the omission of Tony as being due to copyright reasons in that the rights to the series of books that feature Tony are owned by another network.

== Episodes ==
=== Season 1 (2007) ===
No. overall	No. in season	Title	Directed by	Written by	Original release date
1	1	"Blood Price"	Allan Kroeker	Peter Mohan	March 11, 2007
2	2	"Blood Price"	Allan Kroeker	Peter Mohan	March 11, 2007
PI Vicki Nelson witnesses a gruesome murder – except because of her failing eyesight, she's not really sure what she saw. Her old prince colleague, detective Mike Celluci, warns her against getting involved. But when a young, heartbroken Goth begs Vicki to investigate her boyfriend's death, Vicki can't help but open up the strangest case of her life. Meanwhile, Henry Fitzroy, a concerned citizen of Toronto, also decides to look into the murders lest they be blamed on a vampire – himself for example. After forming an uneasy alliance with the toothsome Fitzroy, it's up to Vicki to track down who is raising the Ripper demon... before they put the entire world in peril.
3	3	"Bad JuJu"	James Dunnison	Peter Mohan	March 18, 2007
When her client is being hunted by zombies, Vicki turns to Henry for help, but Henry proves surprisingly reluctant to get involved. Rival Voudoun practitioners catch Henry and Vicki in a battle over the resurrection of a dead sorcerer, while Mike investigates the suspicious man in Vicki's life - Henry Fitzroy.
4	4	"Gifted"	James Head	Mark Leiren-Young	March 25, 2007
Vicki looks into the brutal death of a single mother, who appears to have been savaged by a terrifying beast. But does the victim's daughter know more than she's letting on... and is her school ready to let go of their star pupil?
5	5	"Deadly Departed"	David Winkler	Dennis Heaton	April 1, 2007
A defense lawyer in a high-profile murder case is brutally murdered, but the killer has left his fingerprints... on the dead man's heart. As the unseen killer picks off those who put him away one by one, Mike discovers that one of his colleagues has a guilty secret...
6	6	"Love Hurts"	Allan Kroeker	Shelley Eriksen	April 8, 2007
A man hires Vicki to figure out if his wife is cheating on him. After she is found dead, the husband is the prime suspect. But in Vicki's world, things are never quite that simple, and a side trip into the steamier side of suburbia takes a terrifying twist as she discovers just what jealousy can do...
7	7	"Heart of Ice"	James Head	Charles Lazer	April 15, 2007
Homeless people have gone missing, and Vicki gets more than she bargained for when she tries to solve the case. Mike is on yet another case where a prostitute's blood has been drained, and Henry is number one on his list of suspects. But when he agrees to help the mysterious Father Mendoza, has Mike struck a blow for justice or made a deal with the Devil?
8	8	"Heart of Fire"	James Dunnison	Rick Drew	April 22, 2007
Near breaking point under torture, Henry struggles to retain his strength and sanity as Vicki and Mike race to save him, as well as seek answers to the mystery of how Father Mendoza could have encountered Henry over three centuries ago and still be alive in the present.
9	9	"Stone Cold"	Holly Dale	Tanya Huff	April 29, 2007
While looking for a missing male model, our heroes encounter a beautiful club owner with a horrific past. Mike may be falling under her spell, but is she an angry victim or a stone cold killer?
10	10	"Necrodrome"	Andy Mikita	Dennis Heaton	May 6, 2007
A funeral director hires Vicki to track down one of his clients... one of the dead ones. For boxer Diesel Swanson, the day's not getting any better either, despite the fact that he started off dead... but the mystery is that what happens if he isn't?
11	11	"Post Partum"	David Winning	Sarah Dodd	May 13, 2007
A man hires Vicki to check on his wife, who is isolated in a fertility clinic that guarantees results. Vicki has to pretend to be a frustrated would-be mother to get in. Dr. Hobman's strict regime does seem to help infertile women get pregnant, but is there a sinister side to his success?
12	12	"Norman"	Peter DeLuise	Victor Nicolle	May 20, 2007
Vicki's first case comes back to haunt her as evil nerd Norman escapes from the abyss, now with a whole array of demonic powers and revenge on his mind.

=== Season 2 (2007) ===
No. overall	No. in season	Title	Directed by	Written by	Original release date
13	1	"D.O.A."	James Dunnison	Shelley Eriksen	October 12, 2007
One of Vicki's old police colleagues stops by with a case of murder; specifically, his own. However, when Mike witnesses his body still walking and talking, they must determine whether the 'ghost' or the body is telling the truth.
14	2	"Wild Blood"	Andy Mikita	Peter Mohan	October 19, 2007
Mike and Vicki attempt to uncover the only suspect's secret in a murder case where the victim appears to have been torn apart by an intelligent beast, but the only suspect is proving distinctly uncooperative.
15	3	"5:55"	David Winning	Travis MacDonald	October 26, 2007
On the trail of a mysterious antique, Vicki repeatedly relives the day in which she investigates its disappearance, each day culminating in the antique- a mysterious box- being opened and the forces of darkness within it being unleashed.
16	4	"Bugged"	James Head	Dennis Heaton	November 2, 2007
A friend of Coreen's hires Vicki to investigate the sudden death of one of her Goth club's patrons. Meanwhile, Henry suspects that another vampire is moving in on his territory.
17	5	"The Devil You Know"	Andy Mikita	Denis McGrath	November 9, 2007
Henry's former lover shows up in town, seeking his protection from a stalker determined to kill her, but various events- such as her claiming that he was turned over a year ago when his sister possesses a photograph of him in the sun six months ago- prove that she isn't being totally honest.
18	6	"Drawn and Quartered"	David Winning	Dennis Heaton & Denis McGrath	November 16, 2007
A painter friend of Henry becomes a suspect when others in the art community start turning up dead, and Coreen's attempts to investigate result in her becoming too attached to the prime suspect.
19	7	"Wrapped"	Holly Dale	Mark Leiren-Young	November 23, 2007
A motley crew of truckjackers get more than they bargained for when they steal an ancient Incan mummy, leading to a nightmare for Fitzroy as he believes he is seeing his own death when he begins to dream about the mummy.
20	8	"The Good, the Bad and the Ugly"	James Head	Travis MacDonald & Dennis Heaton	November 30, 2007
A self-confessed murderer that Vicki and Mike put away suddenly protests his innocence, claiming that he only saw visions of the real killer's handywork, and that more deaths are imminent. Whether it's a copycat, a stooge, or a psychic psycho, Vicki and Mike are forced to investigate once more, resulting in the discovery of a twisted experiment.
21	9	"We'll Meet Again"	David Winning	Denis McGrath	November 30, 2007
Vicki's client claims he has been reincarnated for centuries and needs her help to find his long lost lover, but in a cruel twist of fate- apparently caused when his last life was kept in a coma after the accident that automatically killed his wife-, this time she's ten years older... and already married. Meanwhile, Fitzroy begins pondering whether he needs a change of scenery, and Celluci's career is increasingly close to the edge...
22	10	"Deep Dark"	James Dunnison	Peter Mohan	December 7, 2007
Though their friendships are at breaking point, Vicki needs Fitzroy and Celluci more than ever when she discovers Coreen has been possessed by a demon. Tough decisions are made when questions of loyalty and love come to the forefront... especially when it is revealed that Coreen will die if the demon is exorcised.

== International airings ==
The series has been bought by UK channel Living and started airing there on August 16, 2007. In 2008 the show commenced screening in Australia on the FOX8 channel. In Spain, it is broadcast by Calle 13 and started on November 22, 2007. In Latin America the series has started to run on AXN, but later changed to Animax the anime and SciFi Channel part of Sony Entertainment (as AXN). It is also broadcast in 2012 on French channel NRJ 12.

== Reception ==
Common Sense Media rated the series 3 out of 5 stars.

== Home media ==
Title	Region 1	Region 2	Region 4	Discs	Extras
Blood Ties: The Complete First Season	June 2, 2009	2008	TBA	4	Behind the Scenes Featurette
Blood Ties: The Complete Second Season	October 6, 2009	TBA	TBA	3	Photo Gallery, Season 1 Trailer
Blood Ties: The Complete Series	April 6, 2010	January 28, 2008	TBA	7	Behind the Scenes Featurette; Photo Gallery Trailers
Blu-ray: The Complete Series	April 6, 2010	January 12, 2011	TBA	4	Behind the Scenes Featurette; Photo Gallery (in high def); Trailers

== Smoke and Mirrors ==
In April 2010, it was announced that The Fremantle Corporation and Kaleidoscope Entertainment are developing a new vampire series, Smoke & Mirrors, based on the "Smoke" book series by Canadian fantasy author Tanya Huff. Kaleidoscope in 2007 turned Huff's "Blood" book series into the Lifetime Television series Blood Ties, which also aired in Canada on Citytv and Space. Fremantle and Kaleidoscope are now shopping Smoke & Mirrors, starting at MIPTV, as a possible Canadian-European co-production. The urban fantasy series will see the return of Henry Fitzroy, the 474-year-old vampire, in a series of paranormal misadventures experienced on a fictional TV series shoot.

The "Smoke" book series is a sequel to Huff's "Blood" book, in which the characters are Tony Foster (character replaced by Coreen in Blood Ties) and Henry Fitzroy, dedicated to solving mysteries and combating supernatural threats.

== See also ==
- Vampire film
- List of vampire television series
