= Two of Hearts (film) =

- Written by: Nancey Silvers
- Directed by: Harvey Frost
- Starring: Gail O'Grady; Rob Stewart; Corbin Bernsen; Myles Ferguson; Marla Maples; Jane McGregor; Alan Thicke; Teryl Rothery; Norma MacMillan
- Music by: Ken Williams
- Country of origin: Canada
- Original language: English

Production
- Producer: James Shavick
- Cinematography: Robert C. New
- Editor: Jeremy Presner

Original release
- Release: February 14, 1999

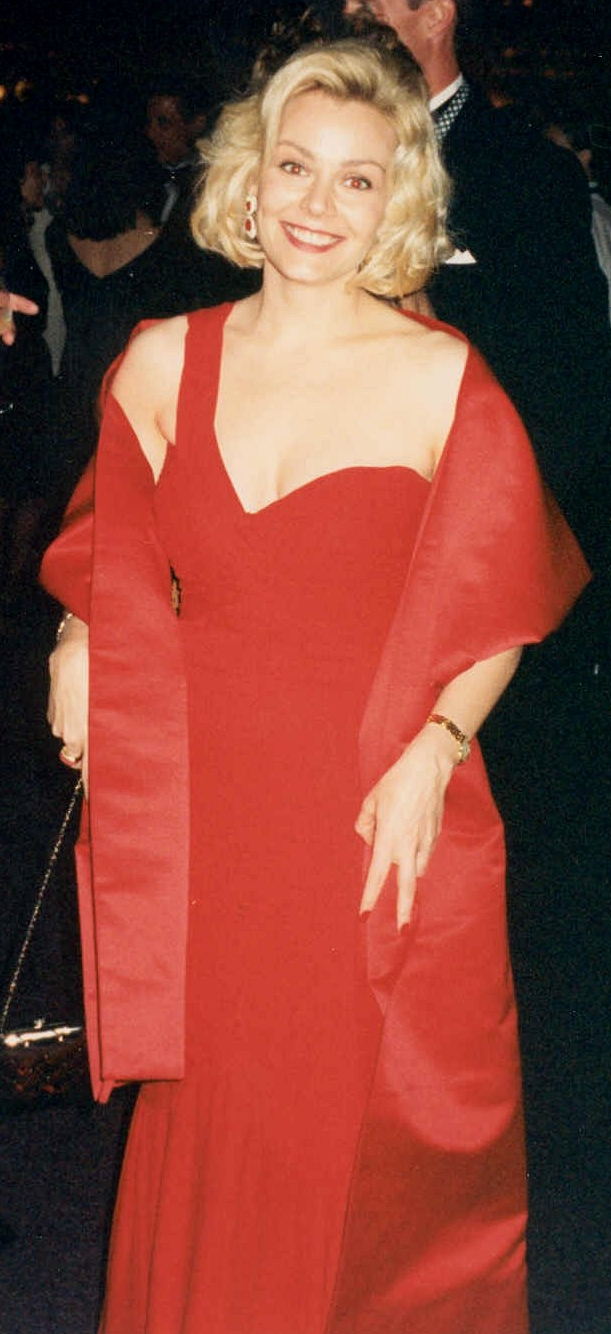
Gail O'Grady at the Emmy Awards, 1994

Two of Hearts is a 1999 romantic comedy television film directed by Harvey Frost. The plot centers on characters portrayed by Gail O'Grady and Rob Stewart; the two characters are losers who encounter each other at the wedding of their respective ex-spouses.
