= Zerophilia =

- Promotional poster
- Directed by: Martin Curland
- Written by: Martin Curland
- Produced by: Gregory Lanesey; Matt Radecki; Martin Curland; Alan Grossbard; Jay Whitney Brown
- Starring: Taylor Handley; Gina Bellman; Kyle Schmid; Kelly LeBrock
- Cinematography: Graham Futerfas
- Music by: Kevin McDaniels; Edie Pijpers
- Distributed by: TLA Releasing; Allumination Filmworks; Microangelo Entertainment
- Release dates: October 26, 2005 (São Paulo); October 13, 2006 (United States)
- Running time: 90 minutes
- Country: United States
- Language: English

Zerophilia is a 2005 romantic comedy film with speculative-fiction elements directed by Academy of Motion Pictures' Student Academy Award-winning director Martin Curland and produced by Microangelo Entertainment. It is about a young man who discovers that he has a genetic condition which will cause a change of sex following each orgasm. It was filmed in Fall Creek, Oregon.

== Plot ==
After Luke (Taylor Handley) loses his virginity to a random stranger he meets on a camping trip (Kelly LeBrock), he soon finds parts of his body intermittently transforming into those of a female's body and back. Upon returning from his trip, Luke takes his car for repairs and meets the shop's owner Max (Kyle Schmid), whom Luke envies for exhibiting the kind of suave, confident masculinity that he himself cannot, and Max's sister Michelle (Rebecca Mozo), a recent transfer student at Luke's school whom Luke had been fostering a crush on. Luke asks Michelle out and the two hit it off, with Luke interested in Michelle's down-to-earth bluntness and Michelle in his sensitivity, but Michelle is somewhat wary of him due to having recently gotten out of a relationship with an ex-boyfriend who had cheated on her.

Luke's attraction to Michelle causes him to experience partial transformations that he tries to hide from her, with one incident earning him Max's ire due to Luke accidentally abandoning her on a date as a result. Dr. Sydney Catchadourian (Gina Bellman), a doctor whom Luke's best friend Keenan (Dustin Seavey) had contacted for help, explains that Luke has a rare genetic condition caused by an extra "Z-chromosome" called "zerophilia", which had become active following Luke's first sexual experience and will cause him to change into the opposite gender whenever aroused.

On Catchadourian's advice, Luke masturbates to trigger a full transformation into a girl in order to stabilize future transformations, but the now-female Luke (Marieh Delfino) struggles to get herself sufficiently aroused to change back. When Max comes to visit, Keenan and his girlfriend Janine (Alison Folland) introduce Luke's female form to Max as Luke's cousin "Luca", whom Max immediately takes a liking to and starts flirting with. Luca is unnerved when she finds Max attractive enough to stimulate the arousal necessary for her to change back after he leaves, and Luke subsequently tries to keep Max away from "Luca", to Max's chagrin.

As Keenan and Janine get into disputes regarding Luke's gender identity and sexual orientation, Catchadourian, who happens to be another zerophiliac, tells Luke that he now has to make a choice on what he wants to be: he can make the changes stop by having sex with another zerophiliac to become "adulmorphic", something Catchadourian had done in the past when the constant changes had become too much to bear. Catchadourian is not comfortable with having a female body and believes that staying as a woman had been the wrong choice in retrospect, but has no regrets about having needed to make the transformations stop before having a clear answer at the time. Catchadourian offers to have sex with Luke to make him adulmorphic and stop transforming, convincing him that they should do it the following night.

Later, Michelle visits Luke to ask about how he feels about Max, but when Luke criticizes his attitude, Michelle becomes upset and asserts that Luke needs to like Max in order to like her as well. It is then revealed to the audience that Michelle is actually a zerophiliac herself, that Max is not her brother but her own male form, and that she had been living a double life comfortably as both genders; it is implied that her previous relationship had failed out of her ex-boyfriend being disgusted with her nature as a zerophiliac and that she had been using both of her forms to get closer to Luke and understand him better, fearing that she would be rejected again if he could not come to like her as Max.

Feeling remorse about his fight with Michelle, Luke goes to visit Max in Luca's form the next day, but while Max is initially happy to see Luca, Luca begins to find herself getting caught up in his flirting and abruptly cuts him off out of shame, leaving him confused and upset. Having witnessed the incident, Keenan becomes cold towards Luke, reinforcing Luke's decision to have sex with Catchadourian later that night in order to become adulmorphic and stop changing. However, once the deed is done, Catchadourian turns out to have tricked him: adulmorphic zerophiliacs will still change as long as they have sex with another zerophiliac, and Catchadourian had been using Luke out of desperation to get his male form (Rick Stear) back, resulting in Luke being stuck as Luca. Catchadourian advises her that this will not make her any less of a man but abandons her to deal with the consequences, having gotten what he wanted.

An apologetic Keenan helps Luca chase after Catchadourian, and on the way, Luca confesses that she is not entirely certain about what gender she identifies as anymore but also believes Michelle would not want to be with "some guy who thinks maybe he's supposed to be a girl sometimes." Keenan and Luca find Catchadourian flirting with closeted gay bartender Jeremy (Chris Meyer), whom he had shown interest in earlier. Catchadourian explains that he is exclusively attracted to men and had initially decided to be a woman specifically to avoid the self-consciousness associated with being gay; since he has no interest in women whatsoever, he cannot do anything for Luca anymore, since changing genders as an adulmorphic zerophiliac requires both parties to be attracted.

Upon finding out that Luke had slept with Catchadourian, Michelle lashes out at Luca, revealing that she already knew Luca's identity and demanding to know what she thinks of her and Max. Desperate to prove that she had not intended to cheat on Michelle, Luca explains that she wanted to make her changes stop and insists that she only has interest in Michelle and not Max, which only incenses Michelle further and convinces her that Luke had done it out of hatred for his nature as a zerophiliac, resulting in her breaking the relationship off. Now out of options, Luca wistfully asks Keenan and Janine about what it's like to truly make love, expressing envy about how easy it is for them to have each other without worrying about anything else; seeing them describe each other as their respective other half, Luca laments not knowing what "half" she would even belong to and concludes that she prefers being male but is also female, is attracted to Max and in love with Michelle, and thus "It's like I'm supposed to be both. Not too practical, but at least now I know."

Two days later, believing that her relationship with Michelle is ruined beyond repair, Luca goes to visit Max and asks him to pass on an apology and her wishes for Michelle's happiness, explaining that she had tried to stop her changes as a zerophiliac in order to "be a man for her." She then apologizes to Max for leading him on with mixed signals and confesses that she finds him to be attractive, but refuses to start a relationship with him out of a belief that it would mean betraying Michelle. Finally understanding Luca's intentions and loyalty, Max calls her a "moron" for not noticing and reveals his identity to her, and the two reconcile by making love, cycling through every combination of their genders and having intimate conversation in between.

The next morning, the now adulmorphic Michelle wakes up with Luke in her room and admits that she still harbors fears of Luke abandoning her and leaving her unable to switch, to which he responds by playfully asking if she wants a "gender prenup" and assuring her he has no intention of going anywhere before helping her change into Max so she can go to work.

== Cast ==
- Taylor Handley as Luke
  - Marieh Delfino as Luca
- Dustin Seavey as Keenan
- Alison Folland as Janine
- Kyle Schmid as Max
  - Rebecca Mozo as Michelle
- Adam Zolotin as Chad
- Gina Bellman as Dr. Sydney Catchadourian (female)
  - Rick Stear as Dr. Sydney Catchadourian (male)
- Chris Meyer as Jeremy
- Kelly Le Brock as Woman in RV

== Release ==
The film was released on October 13, 2006, in theaters in North America, and performed poorly at the box office. It was released internationally on cable and DVD in February 2007.

=== Reception ===
The film received negative reviews from critics. It has a 25% approval rating on the review aggregator website Rotten Tomatoes, based on 20 reviews. The website's consensus reads, "Zerophilia has some intriguing ideas, but they're imparted with a frustrating lack of wit, daring, or valuable insight."
