= A Girl Like Me: The Gwen Araujo Story =

2006 film directed by Agnieszka Holland

- Official poster
- Written by: Shelley Evans
- Directed by: Agnieszka Holland
- Starring: J. D. Pardo; Mercedes Ruehl
- Theme music composer: Jan A.P. Kaczmarek
- Country of origin: United States
- Original language: English

Production
- Producer: Fran Rosati
- Cinematography: David Frazee
- Editor: Michael John Bateman
- Running time: 96 minutes

Original release
- Network: Lifetime
- Release: June 19, 2006

A Girl Like Me: The Gwen Araujo Story is a 2006 American biographical drama television film directed by Agnieszka Holland and starring J. D. Pardo, Mercedes Ruehl, and Avan Jogia. It premiered on Lifetime in the United States on June 19, 2006. The film dramatizes the events surrounding the 2002 murder of Gwen Araujo, a transgender teenager who was murdered after acquaintances discovered that she had male genitalia.

In 2007, the film won the GLAAD Media Award for Outstanding Television Movie or Miniseries at the 18th GLAAD Media Awards.

== Plot ==
Sylvia Guerrero is a young single mother looking to make a fresh start for her three young children. Having escaped an abusive relationship at the hands of the children's father, Sylvia has moved back home to California to live closer to her tight-knit Latino family. Her father's birthday party is the first big family gathering since her return, and when she arrives, she encounters mixed reactions about her decision to leave her husband. After dinner, the children at the party decide to play a prank by putting Sylvia's daughter, Gwen, in a frilly pink dress. Gwen and the other children stand smiling; the adults at the party appear unamused and some look on with disdain.

The film alternates between the family's story and the future trial of two men charged with Gwen's murder. As the prosecutor's witness, a medical examiner testifies that the victim was beaten, strangled, wrapped in a shower curtain, and dumped in the woods. When asked about the victim's gender, she states, “it was that of a normally developed male”.

After the party, Sylvia's sister confronts her about the incident with the dress. Sylvia denies that it's an issue and tells her that Gwen's the best-behaved of all her children. Sylvia says that she's more worried about finding a job to support her children than she's about the fact that Gwen's a little bit different from other seven-year-olds. Several days later, Sylvia comes home to celebrate her success at getting a job, and finds Gwen wearing a bra and makeup. Her older daughter Chita insists that it's just a game, but Sylvia makes Gwen promise that it will not happen again.

The movie cuts forward and Gwen's now a teenager, starting her first day at a new high school. Although Sylvia encourages her child to act “normal”, after she's dropped off, Gwen makes a last-minute decision to wear lipstick. When Sylvia realizes what has happened, the two have an intense fight and Sylvia begins removing all the traditionally female items from Gwen's room. However, after talking to a counselor at the Gender Identity Project and coming home to find Gwen in tears over being “a freak”, Sylvia has a moment of acceptance and tells Gwen that they need to get her waterproof mascara. At school, a friendly girl named Lisa White compliments Gwen's makeup, and she introduces herself as Gwen for the first time.

At the trial, the defense attorney asks Lisa questions about Gwen. He strongly implies that she was sexually promiscuous and into drugs at the time of her death, which Lisa vehemently denies. Lisa describes herself as Gwen's best friend and constantly corrects the defense attorney when he refers to Gwen using the incorrect pronouns.

Basking in her now openly expressed gender identity, Gwen grows out her hair and wears a dress to Chita's wedding, which shocks and displeases her extended family. At the wedding, she meets Joey Marino, a former Marine who's new to the area. The two hit it off and eventually begin dating. Worried about the relationship, Sylvia eventually outs Gwen to Joey, who breaks things off. Distraught, Gwen agrees to go to a party with Tamara, a female friend of Joey's. The next morning, Gwen's aunt wakes up to find her passed out on the front lawn. Jealous that the group of boys at the party paid so much attention to Gwen, Tamara begins to suggest that Gwen's actually a male. The group makes a plan to find out the truth. Tamara lures Gwen to another party, promising that Joey will be there. When Gwen arrives, one of the boys forces her into a closet and pulls down her pants, discovering that she has male genitalia. The boys' initial shock quickly turns to rage, and they begin to viciously beat Gwen to death. Tamara realizes what she's done and screams for the boys to stop. She's told to leave. She leaves crying and ashamed for what she did. Sylvia immediately reports Gwen missing, and when her body's found, the entire family comes together to pay their respects, even in the face of protesters picketing the funeral.

In the final scene of the trial, the defense attempts to blame society for the boys’ actions, saying that discovering Gwen's biological sex challenged their sexual identity in a way that made them “go crazy”. On the witness stand, Sylvia rejects this idea completely, telling the courtroom that the killers’ decision to take her daughter's life was theirs alone and that she blames them every day of her life; the boys become remorseful as a result of her words. As Sylvia walks out of the courtroom, the people observing the trial begin to clap.

== Cast ==
- J. D. Pardo as Gwen Araujo
- Mercedes Ruehl as Sylvia Guerrero
- Leela Savasta as Chita Araujo
- Avan Jogia as Danny Araujo
- Lupe Ontiveros as Mami
- Henry Darrow as Papi
- Corey Stoll as Joey Marino
- Vanesa Tomasino as Tamara Jones
- Greyston Holt as Jaron Nabors
- Nolan Gerard Funk as Michael Magidson
- Neil Denis as Jose Merel
- Jorge Vargas as Jason Cazares
- Ivan De Leon as Berto
- Nicole Muñoz as Chita Araujo (age 10)
- Michael Dillman as Eddie Araujo (age 7)

== See also ==
- Boys Don't Cry (1999)
- Soldier's Girl (2003)
- Transgender in film and television
- Trans bashing
- Transphobia
- Intersectionality
