= Amy Pietz =

American actress

- Born: Milwaukee, Wisconsin, U.S.
- Occupation: Actress
- Years active: 1992–present
- Spouse: Kenneth Alan Williams (m. 1997; div. 2007)

Amy Pietz is an American actress. She is known for her roles on television. She received the Screen Actors Guild Award for Outstanding Performance by a Female Actor in a Comedy Series nomination for her role as Annie Spadaro in the NBC sitcom Caroline in the City (1995–99). She later had starring roles in the sitcoms Cursed (NBC, 2000–01), Rodney (ABC, 2004–06), and Aliens in America (The CW, 2007–08).

== Career ==
Pietz began her career playing small roles on television series such as Star Trek: The Next Generation, as well as films Rudy (1993) and Jingle All the Way (1996). In 1995, she was a regular cast member on The WB sitcom Muscle, before her breakthrough role as Annie Spadaro in the NBC sitcom Caroline in the City starring Lea Thompson. The series aired from 1995 to 1999. She was nominated for a Screen Actors Guild Award for Outstanding Performance by a Female Actor in a Comedy Series for the role in 1999.

The following year, Pietz went to star alongside Steven Weber on the NBC sitcom Cursed. The series was canceled after a single season in 2001. She later played Martha Boswell in the stage musical The Boswell Sisters.

From 2004 to 2006, she appeared in ABC sitcom Rodney. During 2007–08 season, she played the mother in The CW sitcom Aliens in America. She also had guest starring roles on Ally McBeal, CSI: Crime Scene Investigation, The Division, Law & Order: Special Victims Unit, Burn Notice, The Closer, Curb Your Enthusiasm, Nip/Tuck, Desperate Housewives, Two and a Half Men, Mom, and How to Get Away with Murder. She had a recurring role as Donna in the NBC comedy series The Office in 2010.

In 2011, Pietz played Meredith King, the mother of Chloe King, in the ABC Family drama series The Nine Lives of Chloe King. In 2016, she was cast as lead character's boss in The CW comedy-drama series No Tomorrow.

In 2016, Pietz guest-starred in the 4th season of Marc Maron's IFC series Maron as Natalie, a fellow rehab patient. In 2019, she starred as Ralph Dibny's mother in The Flash.

== Personal life ==
Pietz married actor Kenneth Alan Williams in 1997 in her native Milwaukee. Pietz gave birth to a son when she was 23, Benjamin, whom she subsequently placed for adoption. She is a graduate of DePaul University.

== Filmography ==
=== Film ===
| Year | Title | Role | Notes |
|---|---|---|---|
| 1993 | Rudy | Melinda | |
| 1996 | Jingle All the Way | Liza Tisch | |
| 2009 | Reunion | Sadie | |
| 2009 | You | Sam | |
| 2010 | Adventures of a Teenage Dragon Slayer | Officer Annie | |
| 2011 | Prom | Mrs. Doyle | |
| 2013 | Zephyr Springs | Dawn | |
| 2013 | Autumn Leaves | Autumn | Short film |
| 2014 | The Pact 2 | Margaret 'Maggie' Abbot | |
| 2017 | Halfway | Beth | |
| 2017 | The Year of Spectacular Men | Bitchy Casting Director | |
| 2020 | Hooking Up | Betty Beane | |

=== Television ===
| Year | Title | Role | Notes |
|---|---|---|---|
| 1993 | Missing Persons | Lucy Stansfield | Episode: "Sometimes You Can't Help Getting Involved.." |
| 1994 | Star Trek: The Next Generation | Lt. Sandra Rhodes | Episode: "Bloodlines" |
| 1995 | Muscle | Bronwyn Jones | Main role |
| 1995–1999 | Caroline in the City | Annie Spadaro | Main role |
| 1997 | All Lies End in Murder | Terri Paxton | TV film |
| 1997 | Every 9 Seconds | Carrie | TV film |
| 1998 | Conrad Bloom | Bonnie | Episode: "Gone with the Re-Wind" |
| 1999 | Starship Regulars | Mara | Voice |
| 2000–2001 | The Weber Show | Melissa Taylor | Main role |
| 2002 | Ally McBeal | Bonnie Boone | Episodes: "A Kick in the Head", "Homecoming" |
| 2003 | CSI: Crime Scene Investigation | Rebecca McCormick | Episode: "Lady Heather's Box" |
| 2003 | The Drew Carey Show | Elaine | Episode: "Two Girls for Every Boy" |
| 2003 | ER | Pregnant HIV+ Woman | Episode: "Freefall" |
| 2003 | Newton | Alice Pryor | TV film |
| 2004 | All About the Andersons | Mrs. Sandore | Episode: "Get Out of Dodge... Ball" |
| 2004 | The Division | Jo Miller | Episode: "Skips and Scones" |
| 2004 | I'm with Her | Samantha | Episodes: "Party of Two", "Friends in Low Places", "Drama Queen" |
| 2004–2006 | Rodney | Charlie | Main role |
| 2005 | Law & Order: Special Victims Unit | Zoe Dunlop | Episode: "Alien" |
| 2007–2008 | Aliens in America | Franny Tolchuck | Main role |
| 2008 | Burn Notice | Jeannie Anderson | Episode: "Double Booked" |
| 2008 | Ghost Whisperer | Lisa Keller | Episode: "Bloodline" |
| 2009 | The Closer | Dana Crawford | Episode: "Good Faith" |
| 2009 | Bones | Ellen Clark | Episode: "The Salt in the Wounds" |
| 2009 | Trust Me | Diane | Episodes: "What's the Rush?", "Odd Man Out", "The More Things Change" |
| 2009 | Hawthorne | Gretchen Breyer | Episode: "Night Moves" |
| 2009 | Curb Your Enthusiasm | Wendy | Episode: "Denise Handicapped" |
| 2009 | Medium | Nancy Covington | Episode: "Once in a Lifetime" |
| 2010 | Nip/Tuck | Allison Krieger | Episode: "Walter and Edith Krieger" |
| 2010 | American Dad! | Ally / Elaine (voice) | Episode: "Great Space Roaster" |
| 2010 | Desperate Housewives | Madeline | Episode: "You Must Meet My Wife" |
| 2010 | The Office | Donna Newton | Recurring role (seasons 6–7) |
| 2011 | Private Practice | Isabelle | Episode: "Love and Lies" |
| 2011 | The Paul Reiser Show | Betsy | Episode: "The Old Guy" |
| 2011 | The Nine Lives of Chloe King | Meredith King | Main role |
| 2012 | Necessary Roughness | Corinne Walsh | Episode: "All the King's Horses" |
| 2012 | Stalked at 17 | Karen Curson | TV film |
| 2012 | Audrey | Julie | Episodes: "Satisfy Me", "Black Gold", "A Tart Finish" |
| 2013 | The Mentalist | Joanna Lyle | Episode: "Days of Wine and Roses" |
| 2013 | Dexter | Dr. Kruper | Episode: "Remember the Monsters?" |
| 2014 | Two and a Half Men | Angie | Episode: "Lotta Delis in Little Armenia" |
| 2014 | How to Get Away with Murder | Sharon Remini | Episode: "We're Not Friends" |
| 2015 | Backstrom | Christina Rose | Episode: "I Am a Bird Now" |
| 2015 | Stalked by My Neighbor | Andrea Allen | TV film |
| 2015 | Devious Maids | Susie | Episode: "Suspicion" |
| 2016 | The Magicians | Hannah / The Lamia | Episodes: "Impractical Applications", "Remedial Battle Magic" |
| 2016 | Maron | Natalie | Episode: "The 13th Step" |
| 2016–2017 | No Tomorrow | Deirdre Hackmeyer | Main role |
| 2017 | You're the Worst | Adrienne | Episode: "A Bunch of Hornballs" |
| 2017 | Hit the Road | Meg Swallow | Main role |
| 2019–2020 | Modern Family | Janice | Recurring role (Seasons 10–11) |
| 2019 | The Flash | Debbie Dibny | Episode: "Dead Man Running" |
| 2019 | Animal Kingdom | Meredith | 3 episodes |
| 2020 | Mom | Rebecca | Episode: "Big Sad Eyes and a Wrinkled Hot Dog" |
| 2022 | Dynasty | Mandy Von Dunkel | Episode: "But a Drug Scandal?" |
| 2022 | Love, Victor | Margaret Campbell | Guest role (season 3) |
| 2023 | Wolf Pack | Kendra Lang | Recurring role |
| 2024 | 9-1-1 | Tori | Episode: "Buzzkill" |
| 2025 | Grey's Anatomy | Shelby Lewis | Episode: "Don't You (Forget About Me)" |
| 2025 | Tracker | Ivy Hale | Episode: "Monster" |
| 2025 | Paradise | Marsha | Episodes: "You Asked for Miracles", "The Day" |
| 2026 | Elle | Donna | Main role |
