= Sex and the Single Mom =

2003 film

- DVD cover
- Written by: Judith Paige Mitchell
- Directed by: Don McBrearty
- Starring: Gail O'Grady; Grant Show; Danielle Panabaker
- Music by: Alexina Louie, Alex Pauk
- Country of origin: United States
- Original language: English

Production
- Producers: Terry Gould, Lee Alexander, Andrea Baynes, Tim Enright
- Cinematography: Rhett Morita
- Editor: Jeff Warren
- Running time: 120 minutes
- Production company: Andrea Baynes Productions

Original release
- Network: Lifetime
- Release: September 8, 2003

Sex & the Single Mom is a 2003 Lifetime made for television drama film directed by Don McBrearty and starring Gail O'Grady, Grant Show, and Danielle Panabaker.

== Synopsis ==
Jess (Gail O'Grady) a female paralegal and studying to become a lawyer, is a single and overly concerned mother of a 15-year-old girl, Sara (Danielle Panabaker). She becomes even more overprotective and overbearing when Sara tells her that she is thinking about having sex with her boyfriend Chad. One day during court, Jess meets Alex Lofton (Grant Show) a heart surgeon from Atlanta, Georgia, who is currently separated from his wife and has two children. During a dinner meeting the two begin to talk to each other, and soon begin a passionate affair, with Jess keeping it a secret from Sara. A week before Thanksgiving Jess and Alex meet at a hotel in Chicago and have sex, after which Alex admits that he has fallen in love with Jess, but has decided to go back to Atlanta where his children are, which breaks Jess' heart.

During Thanksgiving, Jess begins to feel sick and secretly buys a pregnancy test from the pharmacy. The test reveals that she got pregnant from her final encounter with Alex, which she tries to hide from Sara by throwing the test in the garbage, but Sara later finds it and Jess confesses. A few days later, Jess catches Sara during a sexual encounter with Chad in her bedroom. She kicks Chad out and tries to ground Sara, but Sara decides to leave and go live with her father and stepmom since her mom was being a hypocrite. A couple of nights later, Sara goes to a party with her friend Tyler, and catches Chad having sex with Tyler's girlfriend Leeza. Sara leaves the party, returns home to Jess, and they reconcile. A few months later, Jess goes into labor, and gives birth to a baby boy she decides to name Jake, after her father, who died some time ago. Sara promises to help her take care of Jake.

== Cast ==
- Gail O'Grady as Jess Gradwell
- Grant Show as Alex Lofton
- Danielle Panabaker as Sara Gradwell
- Nigel Bennett as Nick Gradwell
- Cindy Sampson as April Gradwell
- Joshua Close as Tyler
- Kyle Schmid as Chad
- Shelley Thompson as Alyssa
- Barbara Gordon as Valerie
- Heather Blom as Leeza
- John Maclaren as Harrison
- Maria Ricossa as Deena
- Geordie Brown as Frankie
- Jamie Bradley as Howard
- Julie Naugler as Trick-or-Treating Cat

== Reception ==
The Oklahoma Gazette panned the movie overall, while DVD Verdict gave a more positive review for Sex and the Single Mom, saying it was "quite entertaining, well acted, and well made, save for certain unnecessary plot developments".

== Sequel ==
A sequel to Sex and the Single Mom, entitled More Sex and the Single Mom, was released in 2005 with O'Grady reprising her role as Jess. For some unknown reason Danielle Panabaker didn't reprise her role as Sara and was succeeded by Chelsea Hobbs. The film focuses on Jess's life as a mother of a teenage daughter and three-year-old son, as well as on her increasingly complicated love and sex life. Her daughter Sara just turn 18 and will be heading to college soon. She is planning on losing her virginity. 2 years after the first film Jess becomes engaged to Steve a lawyer who works in the same office as her and plans on adopting her son Jake but one day when Jess leaves work she soon runs into Alex Lofton her old ling and Jake's dad to which she leaves before Alex can talk to her. Alex comes over to Jess's house unannounced and finds out about his son Jake to whom he knew nothing about and meets Sarah. The next night Alex comes back and after Sarah leaves he tells Jess that he's divorcing his wife because he's not in love with her and that he's in love with Jess but Jess tells Alex that she's not in love with him and that she's engaged to Steve but after several attempts Jess unwantinly has sex with Alex in her bedroom and afterwards he tells her that he'll do whatever she wants except give up on Jake. The next night Alex, Jess, and Steve go out to dinner together at a restaurant to discuss Jake to which doesn't go well as Alex mentions he wishes he could sit next to Jess much to Steve's horror but eventually they come up with a shared custody agreement with Alex coming and taking Jake with him every month. A few days Later Jess takes Jake to a petting zoo and introduces Jake to Alex as his father and the 3 of them feed animals together and then afterwards Alex tells Jake he loves him and that he'll see him again next month. When Jess gets home she finds Steve who tells her he's furious about what happened at dinner a few nights ago and believes Jess is in love with Alex but Jess tells him that she's not in love with Alex but Steve doesn't believes her and also reveals that he somehow unknowingly found out that Jess and Alex had sex together in her bedroom. Jess tells Steve that it didn't mean anything to her but Steve still refuses to believe her and breaks off the engagement with her. The next day Jess tells Sarah about Steve breaking up with her but Sarah manages to comfort her by saying that she does think that Alex truly loves her and after some encouragement from Sarah Jess rushes to the airport and stops Alex from leaving to go back to Atlanta and the pair confess their love for each other as the film ends. In an interview with The Tuscaloosa News, O'Grady admitted that she had been "pleasantly surprised" when informed that there would be a sequel and stated that the ending of the second film left the door open for future sequels.
