= Red Hook Crit =

Criterium cycling race originally held in Red Hook, Brooklyn

Race details
- Region: USA and Europe
- Nickname(s): RHC
- Discipline: Road race
- Type: criterium
- Organiser: Trimble Racing
- Race director: David Trimble

History
- First edition: 2008
- Final edition: 2018
- First winner: Kacey Manderfield (USA) (2008)
- Most wins: Women: Ainara Elbusto (ESP) (5 races) Men: Neil Bezdek (USA) (4 Races) Colin Strickland (USA) (4 Races)
- Final winner: Men: Filippo Fortin (ITA); Women: Rachele Barbieri (ITA)

Red Hook Crit was a criterium cycle race, held annually in Red Hook, Brooklyn starting in 2008. The series was founded by David Trimble. Red Hook races were also held in three European cities: Milan starting in 2010, Barcelona starting in 2013, and at the Greenwich Peninsula, London in 2015.

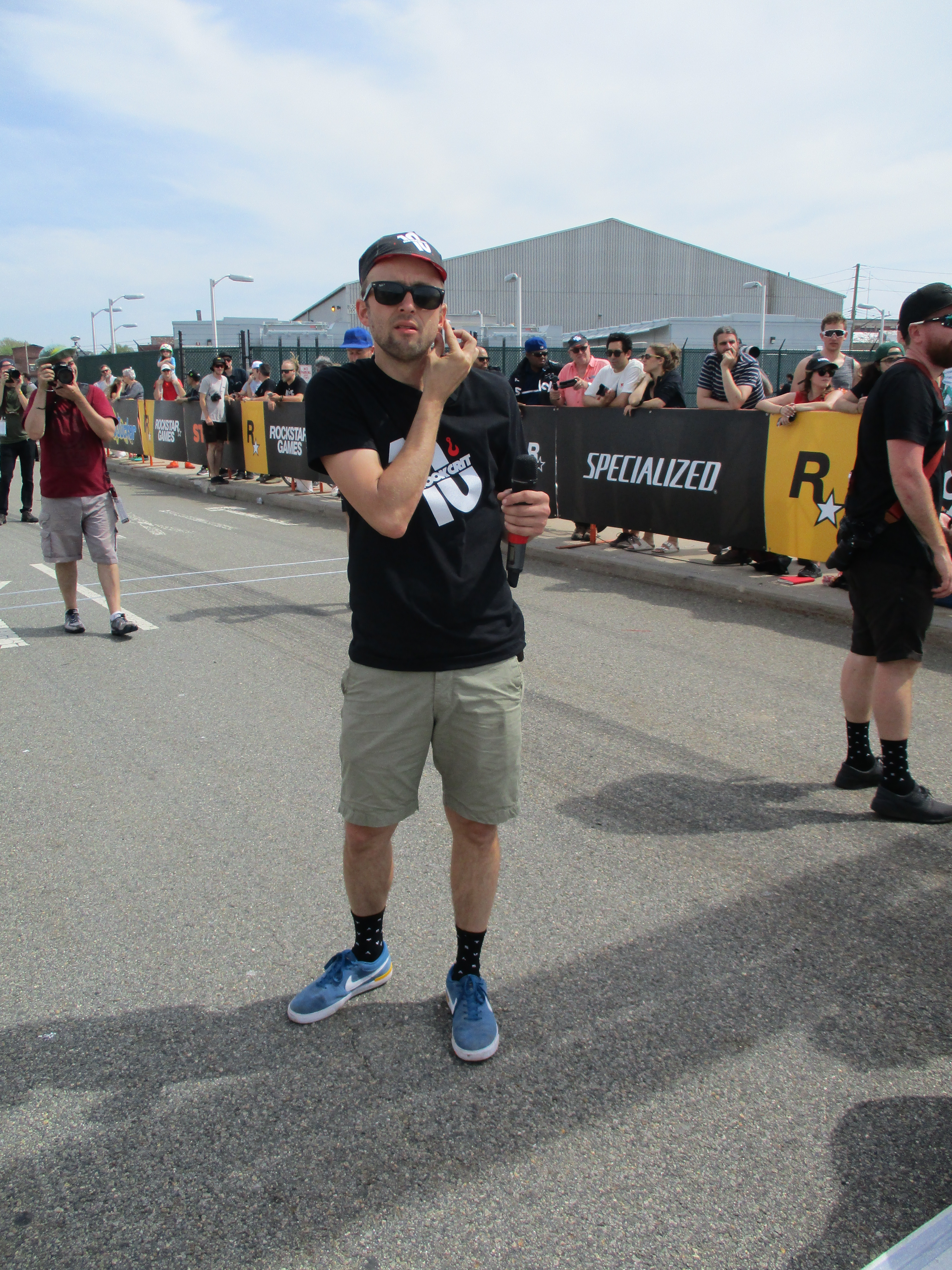
David Trimble, the founder of the event, pictured in 2017

Riders used brakeless fixed-gear bicycles. There were often crashes during the races due to the high speeds and technical courses. It was at one time sponsored by Rockstar Games, among others.

A women's competition was added to the event in 2014.

In 2019 the race series was canceled.

== Races and winners ==
=== 2008 ===
- Brooklyn: Kacey Manderfield (USA)

=== 2009 ===
- Brooklyn: Neil Bezdek (USA)

=== 2010 ===
- Brooklyn: Daniel Chabanov (USA)
- Milan: Jon Ander Ortuondo (ESP)

=== 2011 ===
- Brooklyn: Daniel Chabanov (USA)
- Milan: Neil Bezdek (USA)

=== 2012 ===
- Brooklyn: Daniel Chabanov (USA)
- Milan: Evan Murphy (USA)

=== 2013 ===
- Brooklyn: Neil Bezdek (USA)
  - Additional event at Brooklyn Navy Yard: Neil Bezdek (USA)
- Barcelona: Stefan Vis (NED)
- Milan: Eduard-Michael Grosu (ROM)

=== 2014 ===
In 2014 the separate women's race was held for the first time.

- Brooklyn: Thibaud L'Henry (FRA) / Jo Celso (USA)
- Barcelona: Julio Padilla (GUA) / Ainara Elbusto (ESP)
- Milan: Eduard-Michael Grosu (ROM) / Ash Duban (USA)

=== 2015 ===
- Brooklyn: Ivan Ravaioli (ITA) / Ainara Elbusto (ESP)
- Barcelona: Ivan Ravaioli (ITA) / Kacey Lloyd (USA)
- London: William Guzman (PRI) / Ainara Elbusto (ESP)
- Milan: Colin Strickland (USA) / Ainara Elbusto (ESP)

=== 2016 ===
- Brooklyn: Colin Strickland (USA) / Ainara Elbusto (ESP)
- London: Colin Strickland (USA) / Dani King (GBR)
- Barcelona: Colin Strickland (USA) / Rachele Barbieri (ITA)
- Milan: Stefan Schäfer (GER) / Rachele Barbieri (ITA)

=== 2017 ===
- Brooklyn: Stefan Schäfer (GER) / Colleen Gulick (USA)
- London: Filippo Fortin (ITA) / Raphaele Lemieux (CAN)
- Barcelona: David van Eerd (NED) / Ash Duban (USA)
- Milan: Iván García (ESP) / Maria Vittoria Sperotto (ITA)

=== 2018 ===
- Brooklyn: Filippo Fortin (ITA) / Raphaele Lemieux (CAN)
- Milan: Filippo Fortin (ITA) / Rachele Barbieri (ITA)

== General classification winners ==
The Red Hook Criterium features both an individual general classification as well as a team classification. With the introduction of a women's race in 2014, a women's GC was also introduced.

=== General Classification 2013 ===
Riders

- First Neil Bezdek (USA)
- Runner up Evan Murphy (USA)
- Third Kyle Murphy (USA)

Teams

- First MASH SF (USA)
- Runner Up Iride Demode Squadra Corse (ITA)
- Third Team Cinelli Milano (ITA)

=== General Classification 2014 ===
Men's Riders Classification

- First Thibaud L'Henry (FRA)
- Runner up Mario Paz Duque (COL)
- Third Julio Padilla (GUA)

Men's Teams

- First IRIDE Demode SC (ITA)
- Runner Up MASH (USA)
- Third Team Cinelli Chrome (ITA)

Women's Riders Classification

- First Ainara Elbusto (ESP)
- Runner up Ash Duban (USA)
- Third Fleur Faure (FRA)

Women's Teams

- First Desgena (ITA)
- Runner Up Wolfpack Hussle p/b Aventon (USA)
- Third Team Cinelli Chrome (ITA)

=== General Classification 2015 ===
Men's Riders Classification

- First Ivan Ravaioli (ITA)
- Runner up Augusto Reati (ITA)
- Third Fabio Scarazzati (ITA)

Men's Teams

- First Team Cinelli Chrome (ITA)
- Runner Up Back2Back Imago (ITA)
- Third Supernova Factory Team (ITA)

Women's Riders Classification

- First Ainara Elbusto (ESP)
- Runner up Kacey Lloyd (USA)
- Third Fleur Faure (FRA)

Women's Teams

- First Aventon Factory Team (USA)
- Runner Up Poloandbike (SPA)
- Third Conor WRC (SPA)

=== General Classification 2016 ===
Men's Riders Classification

- First Colin Strickland (USA)
- Runner up Aldo Ino Ilešič (SLO)
- Third Ivan Ravaioli (ITA)

Men's Teams

- First Allez Specialized (USA)
- Runner Up Team Cinelli Chrome (ITA)
- Third Aventon Factory Team (USA)

Women's Riders Classification

- First Ash Duban (USA)
- Runner up Rachele Barbieri (ITA)
- Third Ainara Elbusto (SPA)

Women's Teams

- First WhyBeNormal? (ITA)
- Runner Up LaClassica Racing Team by SpeedGang (ITA)
- Third Aventon Factory Team (USA)

=== General Classification 2017 ===
Men's Riders Classification

- First Davide Viganò (ITA)
- Runner up Filippo Fortin (ITA)
- Third David van Eerd (NED)

Men's Teams

- First Aventon Factory Team (USA)
- Runner Up Cykeln Divisione Corse (ITA)
- Third Bahumer Racing Team (ITA)

Women's Riders Classification

- First Eleonore Saraiva (FRA)
- Runner up Raphaele Lemieux (CAN)
- Third Ash Duban (USA)

Women's Teams

- First Aventon Factory Team (USA)
- Runner Up IRD Carrera Squadra Corse (ITA)
- Third Elf Huez (GBR)
