= Hope Ranch (film) =

2002 American television film

- Home video cover art
- Genre: Family; Western
- Written by: Lynne Moses (additional writer)
- Screenplay by: C. Thomas Howell; Jim Snider
- Story by: Chris Howell
- Directed by: Rex Piano
- Starring: Bruce Boxleitner; Lorenzo Lamas; Barry Corbin; Brian Gross; Richard Lee Jackson; J. D. Pardo; Laura Johnson; Brad Hawkins; Gail O'Grady
- Theme music composer: Bruce Lynch
- Country of origin: United States
- Original language: English

Production
- Executive producers: Paul D. Goldman; Stephen P. Jarchow
- Producers: C. Thomas Howell; Dale G. Bradley; Grant Bradley; Jim Snider; Ben Moses
- Cinematography: Howard Wexler
- Editor: John Blizek
- Running time: 100 minutes
- Production companies: Animal Planet; Regent Entertainment

Original release
- Network: Animal Planet
- Release: September 2, 2002

Hope Ranch is a 2002 American made-for-television Western film about a rancher who takes three teenagers from juvenile court to try to turn them around. It stars Bruce Boxleitner, Brian Gross, Richard Lee Jackson, and J. D. Pardo. Hope Ranch was the first The Discovery Channel-Animal Planet original feature film, which initially aired on September 2, 2002 and was later released on DVD on March 9, 2004. Hope Ranch was directed by Rex Piano.

== Plot summary ==
J.T. Hope, a former police officer and marine and now owner of the Circle Hope Ranch, decides to start a program for troubled teens on the ranch to help turn them around. The first three boys are Keith (Brian Gross), Brooker (Richard Lee Jackson), and Ernesto (J. D. Pardo). The workers at the ranch are Shorty (Barry Corbin) and a former juvenile delinquent Colt Webb (Lorenzo Lamas), who was given a second chance with the help of J.T. As the program goes on, Brooker and Ernesto make progress but J.T. can't get to Keith. He finds out that Keith was being made to do crime and drugs by his older brother Ajax (Brad Hawkins) and he wasn't actually a bad kid. Keith is driving a tractor and it gets out of control, almost running over a young girl called Molly (Isabelle Howell). JT is really angry at Keith and wants to give up on trying to turn him around, but Molly's mother convinces him to give Keith another chance because he isn't trying to be bad. The next day, the three boys have to go back to Juvenile court, and because they made progress, they are allowed another six months at the ranch, giving Keith another chance. The film ends with three more Juvenile court teenagers arriving at the ranch and Keith telling them the rules of the ranch.

== Cast ==
- Bruce Boxleitner as J.T. Hope
- Barry Corbin as 'Shorty'
- Lorenzo Lamas as Colt Webb
- Brian Gross as Keith Frazier
- Richard Lee Jackson as Booker Stokes
- J. D. Pardo as Ernesto Mendoza
- Gail O'Grady as June Andersen
- Isabelle Howell as Molly
- Laura Johnson as Samantha 'Sam' Brooks
- Brad Hawkins as 'Ajax' Frazier
- Nicholas Hill as Dortch
- Stephen Wozniak as 'Waxy'
- Tina Illman as Rachel
- Clint Jung as Juvenile Court Officer

== Critical reception ==
Carolyn Patricia Scott of The Los Angeles Times gave the film a mixed review, stating that "The jokes and tenderfoot mishaps played out against the great outdoors carry along the entertaining, if predictable, story, although the idea that these hard cases could be redeemed in two weeks requires considerable artifice and contrivance."
