= Gail O'Grady =

American actress (born 1963)

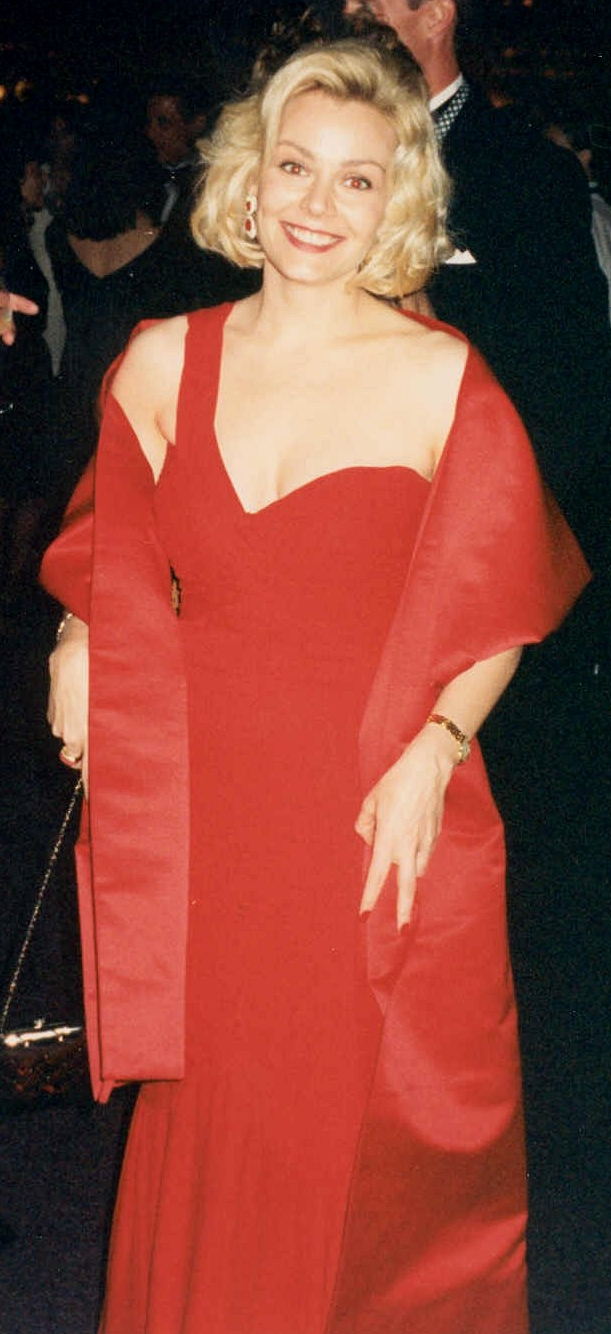
- O'Grady at the 46th Primetime Emmy Awards in 1994
- Born: Gail Ann O'Grady; January 23, 1963 (age 63); Detroit, Michigan, U.S.
- Occupation: Actress
- Years active: 1986–present
- Spouses: Richard Dasko (m. 1981; div. 1983) Jeffrey Byron (m. 1990; div. 1991) Severin Wunderman (m. 1991; div. 1992) Steve Fenton (m. 1995; div. 1996) Anthony J. Pellegrino (m. 1998; div. 2000) John Stamatakis (m. 2004; div. 2008)
- Children: Michael Colton O'Grady
- Parent(s): Jan O'Grady, Jim O'Grady

Gail Ann O'Grady (born January 23, 1963) is an American actress and producer, best known for her roles on television. Her roles include Donna Abandando in the ABC police drama NYPD Blue, and Helen Pryor in the NBC drama series American Dreams. O'Grady is also well known for her lead roles in a number of television movies. She has been nominated for a Primetime Emmy Award three times.

== Early life ==
O'Grady was born in Detroit, Michigan, the daughter of Jim and Jan O'Grady. She was raised in Wheaton, Illinois, and graduated from Wheaton North High School in 1981. She appeared in a few commercials before moving to Los Angeles in 1986.

== Career ==
O'Grady began her career as a model for Montgomery Ward and as an actor in several commercials. In one commercial, she played the neighbor for whom Michael J. Fox's character chases down a Diet Pepsi. In time, she began making guest appearances, often as a villain. She made her big screen debut in the 1988 romantic comedy She's Having a Baby, and later was cast for two episodes on the ABC drama China Beach. She also guest starred on several other shows, and appeared in made for television and independent movies.

Her first major role was as Donna Abandando on the ABC police drama NYPD Blue. O'Grady played the big-haired squad secretary from 1993 to 1996, and for each year received an Emmy Award nomination for Outstanding Supporting Actress in a Drama Series. Along with the cast, she won Screen Actors Guild Award for Outstanding Performance by an Ensemble in a Drama Series in 1995. O'Grady left the series in 1996, and made a pilot for her own sitcom, The Gail O'Grady Project, but the show was not picked up by any of the networks.

After leaving NYPD Blue, O'Grady began starring in numerous television movies for Lifetime and other networks, including The Three Lives of Karen (1997), Two Voices (1997), Every 9 Seconds (1997), Two of Hearts (1999), Another Woman's Husband (2000), Lip Service (2000), Hostage Negotiator (2001), Hope Ranch (2002), Lucky 7 (2003), Sex and the Single Mom (2003), and More Sex & the Single Mom (2005). Her big screen credits include Celtic Pride (1996), That Old Feeling (1997), Deuce Bigalow: Male Gigolo (1999) and Walking Across Egypt (1999).

From 2002 to 2005, O'Grady starred as Helen Pryor in the NBC television series American Dreams, which depicted an all-American family living in Philadelphia, Pennsylvania, during the 1960s. The series was canceled after three seasons. In Fall 2005, O'Grady was lead actress in the ABC comedy series Hot Properties, which was canceled after 13 episodes. In 2006, she guest starred on Two and a Half Men, and in 2007 had a recurring role on Boston Legal as Gloria Weldon, a judge in a personal relationship with attorney Alan Shore. Also in 2007, she starred in the Hallmark Channel movie All I Want for Christmas.

O'Grady had regular roles on the short-lived CW series Hidden Palms as Karen Hardy in 2007, and on Hellcats, playing Wanda Perkins, the mother of the main character, from 2010 to 2011. In 2008, she had a recurring role on the ABC series Desperate Housewives as Anne Schilling, a woman who is having an affair with the character Porter Scavo (at that point a teenager). She appeared on Monk, CSI: Crime Scene Investigation, The Mentalist, Law & Order: Special Victims Unit, Drop Dead Diva, Hawaii Five-0, and Castle. From 2014 to 2015, she had a major recurring role as Conrad's first wife on ABC primetime soap opera Revenge, opposite Madeleine Stowe.

In 2019, O'Grady starred in the Lifetime film Identity Theft of a Cheerleader (which was inspired by the identity theft committed by Wendy Brown) as Angie Patterson, the mother of Maiara Walsh's character Vicky Patterson.

== Personal life ==
O'Grady has been married and divorced six times before the age of 46. One of her exes, artist Robert Claypool, was accused of stalking her after their separation. She has one son, born in 2004.

== Filmography ==
=== Film ===
Year	Title	Role	Notes
1988	She's Having a Baby	Laura	
1988	Blackout	Caroline Boyle	
1988	Spellcaster	Jackie	
1990	Nobody's Perfect	Shelly	
1996	Celtic Pride	Carol O'Hara	
1997	That Old Feeling	Rowena	
1999	Deuce Bigalow: Male Gigolo	Claire	
1999	Walking Across Egypt	Elaine Rigsbee	
2004	The Sure Hand of God	Molly Bowser	
2004	Tricks	Jane	Also producer
2004	Sleep Easy, Hutch Rimes	Olivia Wise	
2008	An American Carol	Jane Wagstaffe	
2009	The House That Jack Built	Hannah	
2010	Circle	Dr. Green	
2011	ChromeSkull: Laid to Rest 2	Nancy	
2014	Mothers of the Bride	Debra Wolf	
2015	Justice Served	Dr. Helen Florentine	
2017	Lycan	Ms. Fields	
2019	Deviant Love	Marlene	
2019	Manipulated	D.A. Diane Conrad	
2021	The Baby Pact	Robin Pyle	
2023	Deadly Draw	Melody Anne Stutz	
2024	Boneyard	Special Agent Womack	

=== Television films ===
Year	Title	Role
1987	Billionaire Boys Club	Judy
1990	People Like Us	Rebecca Bailey
1990	Parker Kane	Cindy Ellis
1991	The Hit Man	Sara
1995	She Stood Alone: The Tailhook Scandal	Lt. Paula Coughlin
1995	Trial by Fire	Paulette Gill
1995	Nothing Lasts Forever	Dr. Page Taylor
1997	The Three Lives of Karen	Karen Winthrop / Emily Riggs / Cindy Last
1997	Two Voices	Kathleen Anneken
1997	Every 9 Seconds	Janet
1997	Medusa's Child	Vivian Henry
1999	Two of Hearts	Molly Saunders
2000	Another Woman's Husband	Susan Miller
2000	Out of Sync	Maggie Stanley
2001	Hostage Negotiator	Theresa Foley
2002	Hope Ranch	June Andersen
2003	Lucky 7	Rachel Myer
2003	Sex and the Single Mom	Jess Gradwell
2005	More Sex & the Single Mom	Jess Gradwell
2005	Mayday	Anne Metz
2007	While the Children Sleep	Meghan Eastman
2007	All I Want for Christmas	Sara Armstrong
2009	Living Out Loud	Emily Marshall
2010	After the Fall	Dr. Susan Miles
2013	Shadow on the Mesa	Mona Eastman
2013	The Minister's Wife (a.k.a. Sins of the Preacher)	Susan Parker
2013	The Mystery Cruise	Alvirah Meehan
2015	The Right Girl	Martha Howard
2017	Love on Ice	Mia Lee
2019	Identity Theft of a Cheerleader	Angie Patterson
2022	Heart of the Matter	Gladys

=== Television series ===
Year	Title	Role	Notes
1986–1990	Matlock	Julia McCullough	2 episodes
1987	Werewolf	Victim in VW	Episode: "Werewolf"
1988	In the Heat of the Night	Pauline Slade	Episode: "Road Kill"
1988	China Beach	Georgia Lee	Episodes: "Pilot" and "Chao Ong"
1989	Superboy	Victoria Letour	Episode: "Hollywood"
1990	Cheers	Laura Walton	Episode: "Finally!: Part 1"
1990	Anything But Love	—N/a	Episode: "Three Men on a Match"
1990	Hardball	—N/a	Episode: "Prescription for Murder"
1992	Murder, She Wrote	Robin Dishman	Episode: "Badge of Honor"
1993	Time Trax	Kristen	Episode: "Fire and Ice "
1993	Designing Women	Kiki Kearney	2 episodes
1993	Silk Stalkings	Betty Whitburn-Marks	Episode: "Crime of Love"
1993–1996, 1999	NYPD Blue	Donna Abandando	Recurring role (season 1), main cast (seasons 2–3), guest (season 6, 1 episode); Screen Actors Guild Award for Outstanding Performance by an Ensemble in a Drama Series; Nominated—Primetime Emmy Award for Outstanding Supporting Actress in a Drama Series (1994–96); Nominated—Satellite Award for Best Supporting Actress – Series, Miniseries or Television Film; Nominated—Screen Actors Guild Award for Outstanding Performance by an Ensemble in a Drama Series (1996–97); Nominated—Viewers for Quality Television Award for Best Supporting Actress in a Quality Drama Series
1994	Burke's Law	Patricia Stone	Episode: "Who Killed the Anchorman?"
1996	Promised Land	Pam Riley	Episode: "The Prodigy"
1996	Space: Above and Beyond	Colonel Klingman (uncredited cameo)	Episode: "Stardust"
1996	The Gail O'Grady Show	Gail	Unsold TV pilot
2001	Ally McBeal	Helena Fisher	Episode: "Home Again"
2002–2005	American Dreams	Helen Pryor	Main cast Nominated — Young Artist Award for Most Popular Mom in a Television Series (2004)
2002	Monk	Miranda St. Claire	2 episodes
2005	Hot Properties	Ava Summerlin	Main cast
2006	Two and a Half Men	Mandi	2 episodes
2007	Hidden Palms	Karen Hardy	Main cast
2007	Monk	Lovely Rita	Episode: "Mr. Monk and the Birds and the Bees"
2007	CSI: Crime Scene Investigation	Mrs. Towne	Episode: "The Case of the Cross-Dressing Carp "
2007	Las Vegas	Erin Hudson	Episode: "It's Not Easy Being Green"
2007	Boston Legal	Judge Gloria Weldon	7 episodes
2007	Cane	Senator Finch	Episode: "The Exile"
2008	The Mentalist	Juniper Tolliver	Episode: "Pilot"
2008	CSI: Miami	Dr. Rachel Marsh	Episode: "And How Does That Make You Kill?"
2008	Desperate Housewives	Anne Schilling	4 episodes
2009	Empire State	Laurel Cochrane	Unsold TV pilot
2009	Law & Order: Special Victims Unit	Ruth Walker	Episode: "Selfish"
2009	Ghost Whisperer	Karen Westen	Episode: "Endless Love"
2009	True Jackson, VP	Sophie Girard	Episode: "Back to School"
2009	CSI: NY	Millie Taylor	Episode: "Blacklist"
2010	The Forgotten	Kerry Denver	Episode: "My John"
2010	Drop Dead Diva	Mrs. Thomas	Episode: "Bad Girls"
2010	The Deep End	Susan Oppenheim	Unsold TV pilot
2010–2011	Hellcats	Wanda Perkins	Main cast
2011	Memphis Beat	Chloe Archer	Episode: "Ten Little Memphians"
2011	Necessary Roughness	Anne Marie	Episode: "Baggage Claim"
2011	Hawaii Five-0	Sharon Archer	Episode: "Alaheo Pau'ole"
2013	Castle	Margo Gower	Episode: "Reality Star Struck"
2013	Rules of Engagement	Joan	Episode: "Cupcake"
2013	Major Crimes	Anne Brand	Episode: "Boys Will Be Boys"
2013	The Crazy Ones	Hannah Sharples	Episode: "Pilot"
2014–2015	Revenge	Stevie Grayson	Recurring role (seasons 3–4}
2015	Code Black	Margaret O'Brien	Episode: "Pre-Existing Conditions"
2016	Fresh Off the Boat	Herself	Episode: "The Taming of the Dads"
2017	Training Day	Claire Millstone	Episode: "Quid Pro Quo"
2017	His Wives and Daughters	Donna Banks	Unsold TV pilot
2018–2023	Criminal Minds	Krystall Richards	7 episodes
2025	Duster	Charlotte Dean-Ellis	Recurring role
