= Colin Strickland =

Former American cyclist (born 1986)

Personal information
- Born: November 7, 1986 (age 39) Johnson City, Texas
- Height: 1.88 m (6 ft 2 in)
- Weight: 75 kg (165 lb)

Cycling career
- Sport: Cycling
- Disciplines: Fixed Gear Criteriums; Road; Gravel Racing

Amateur team
- 2014–2015: Elbowz Racing

Professional team
- 2016: Specialized Allez Allez

Major wins
- 2015 Red Hook Crit Milan; 2016 Red Hook Crit Brooklyn; 2016 Red Hook Crit London; 2016 Red Hook Crit Barcelona; 2019 Unbound Gravel Kansas, USA

Colin Arturo Strickland (born November 7, 1986) is an American former professional bicycle racer specializing in gravel racing and fixed gear criteriums. He first became known for his wins in the Red Hook Crit series, before finding further success at gravel races like Unbound Gravel.

Strickland is known for his connection with the murder of Moriah Wilson. Strickland purchased the gun that his then-live-in girlfriend and business partner Kaitlin Armstrong was convicted of using to kill Moriah Wilson. After the murder of Wilson, Strickland was dropped by a number of sponsors and subsequently left competitive cycling.

== Early life and early career ==
Colin Strickland was born in 1986 in Johnson City, Texas and grew up on a farm. By his twenties, he had started cycling as a form of transportation. His first experience with bicycle racing was winning an Alleycat at the 2010 North American Handmade Bike Show.

In 2019, Strickland rose in prominence by winning the Unbound Gravel 200. While already known as a gravel racer after winning the Gravel Worlds in 2017 and 2018, his victory at Unbound was notable due to the presence of several current UCI World Tour professional riders. His sudden rise to broader cycling stardom led to a contract offer from EF Pro Cycling.

== Association with Mo Wilson ==
On May 11, 2022, Strickland's girlfriend and business partner of three years, Kaitlin Armstrong, murdered Anna Moriah "Mo" Wilson, a professional gravel cyclist, in Austin, Texas. Strickland and Wilson had a romantic relationship during a brief split between Strickland and Armstrong. Armstrong had not moved out during the split. Strickland and Wilson had spent the day of her murder together; going to a local swimming hole and getting dinner. Strickland had changed Wilson's name in his phone to 'Christine Wall'. After dropping Wilson off, he texted Armstrong, lying about his whereabouts. Several months before the murder, Strickland purchased two handguns, one for himself and one for Armstrong. Armstrong later used her handgun to kill Wilson and later testified at the trial as the last person known to see Wilson alive.

== Post-cycling career ==
After the murder of Wilson, Strickland was dropped by a number of sponsors, including Specialized, ENVE Composites, and apparel brand Rapha. Strickland stopped racing in 2022 and left competitive cycling to pursue a career in restoring automobiles.

== Major results ==
2015
1st Red Hook Crit Milan
3rd Road race, National Amateur Road Championships
2016
1st Red Hook Crit

1st Brooklyn
1st London
1st Barcelona

2017
1st Gravel Worlds
2018
1st Gravel Worlds
2nd Overall Tour of America's Dairyland

1st Stages 4 & 10

2019
1st Unbound Gravel
1st The Rift Gravel Race, Iceland
2020
2nd Mid-South Gravel
