= Valle de Yerri / Deierri =

Town in Navarre, Spain

Coordinates: 42°44′N 2°0′W

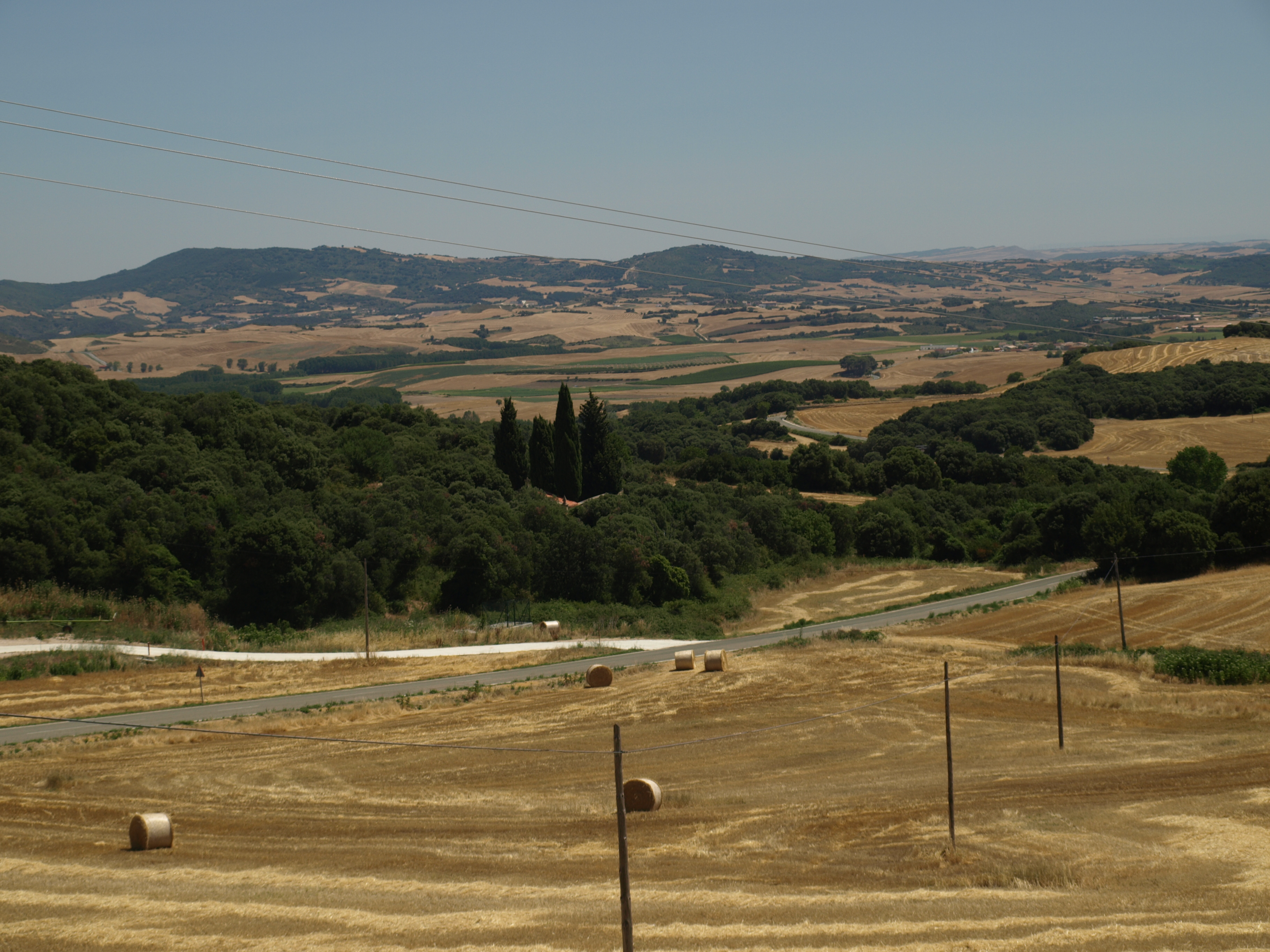
Landscape of the Yerri's Valley, Navarre, Spain

Valle de Yerri (Basque: Deierri) is a town and municipality located in the province and autonomous community of Navarre, northern Spain.
