= At the Devil's Door =

- Teaser poster
- Directed by: Nicholas McCarthy
- Written by: Nicholas McCarthy
- Produced by: Sonny Mallhi
- Starring: Catalina Sandino Moreno; Ashley Rickards; Naya Rivera
- Cinematography: Bridger Nielson
- Edited by: Bill Neil; Jake York
- Music by: Ronen Landa
- Production companies: Varient; Candlewood Entertainment; XYZ Films
- Distributed by: IFC Films
- Release dates: March 9, 2014 (SXSW); September 12, 2014
- Running time: 91 minutes
- Country: United States
- Language: English

At the Devil's Door (originally titled Home) is a 2014 American supernatural horror film directed by Nicholas McCarthy. The film had its world premiere on March 9, 2014, at South by Southwest. It stars Naya Rivera as a woman caught amidst ghostly events.

== Plot ==
A teenage girl Hannah (Ashley Rickards) is told by her new boyfriend that she can get $500 by playing a game run by an old man living in a trailer. After she wins the game, the old man (Michael Massee) instructs her to go to the crossroads and say her name so that "he" will know whom to take. At home later that night, the girl hears voices in her bedroom before being lifted into the air and thrown against the wall.

A real estate agent Leigh (Catalina Sandino Moreno) is trying to sell the home of Chuck (Dan Roebuck) and Royanna (Jan Broberg). While going over the various details of the couple's property, she finds the roll of $500 in the bottom drawer in a bedroom. Leigh later tells the homeowners that she saw a young girl inside their home. The couple assumes that Leigh saw their missing daughter, Charlene, who ran away with her boyfriend several months earlier.

When Leigh goes back to the couple's house, she finds "Charlene." Leigh calls Chuck to let him know that she found Charlene; however, Chuck tells Leigh that police found his daughter at a local mall hours ago. Puzzled, Leigh looks at the files from the couple's home and finds an article with "Charlene's" picture in it. Leigh realizes that the girl she had seen was actually Hannah White, a girl who had committed suicide in 1987. Leigh notices Hannah is missing and tries to look for her in the house. She finds Hannah in an empty room, staring into a mirror. When Leigh tries to speak with Hannah, she is attacked by some unseen force, falls to the floor, and dies.

In a flashback sequence, Hannah is shown attempting to burn the roll of money in the bathroom sink. Her mom reminds her of a babysitting job, which she soon attends. While the parents are at a party, Hannah arrives, clearly mentally disturbed, and informs the parents, "Your baby is dead. You're all dead." Rushing home, the parents find the baby hidden under a cabinet but unharmed. Hannah then walks to her bedroom and, while struggling with an unseen force, hangs herself. Returning to the present time, Hannah splits in two and a creature emerges.

That night, Vera (Naya Rivera), Leigh's sister, has a nightmare that her sister is dead and warns her. After receiving a phone call from the police, the coroner informs Vera that Leigh died of natural causes. Later, in Leigh's home, Vera finds Leigh's files from the couple's house and visits Hannah's old childhood friend. Hannah's friend reveals that Hannah had been pregnant before she died. Many people believed that Hannah had committed suicide because of her pregnancy. However, Hannah's friend insists that Hannah had been a virgin and that she may have killed herself to stop her supernatural child from being born. Since Hannah had killed herself, the demon that had tried to possess her child instead took over her body until it could find another vessel.

Vera returns to her home, where she is assaulted by a demonic force that throws her through a window to fall two stories. Vera wakes up in a hospital; she has been in a coma for eight months. The doctor tells her she was pregnant when it happened. During her ultrasound, Vera sees a demonic face on the monitor and demands an immediate C-section. During the C-section, Vera refuses to hold the baby and instead gives it up for adoption. After leaving the hospital, Vera returns to the house and takes the broken picture of her and Leigh that she had seen earlier, which had been used as decoration for Hannah's old house.

Six years later, Vera's daughter sits watching the news about a devastating flood. Her adoptive mother asks her not to watch it, but the little girl says nothing and changes the channel without moving. When the adopted mother informs her of a visit soon, the little girl ignores her and changes the channel back to the news. Vera visits her daughter and tells the girl that she knows who the little girl really is and demands to know why she was chosen. The girl flees. Vera chases her to an abandoned house in the woods and attempts to kill her. However, the girl, whose eyes have turned black, controls Vera so that she is unable to kill her. Realizing the struggle is pointless, Vera and the girl leave. As the adoptive mother frantically search for the girl, Vera is shown back in her car with the girl unharmed.

In the final scene, the girl tells Vera, "I knew you'd come back for me, mommy." As they drive away, a paraphrased passage from the Christian book of Revalation is heard being read in the daughter's voice.

== Cast ==
- Naya Rivera as Vera
- Catalina Sandino Moreno as Leigh
- Ashley Rickards as Hannah
- Ava Acres as Girl
- Michael Massee as Uncle Mike
- Wyatt Russell as Sam
- Nick Eversman as Calvin
- Tara Buck as Yolanda
- Bresha Webb as Becky
- Olivia Crocicchia as Charlene
- Jennifer Aspen as Lori
- Daniel Roebuck as Chuck
- Arshad Aslam as Seth
- Rob Brownstein as Dr. Daninsky
- Laura Kai Chen as Dr. Kim
- Assaf Cohen as Dr. Aranda
- Kent Faulcon as Davis
- Kate Flannery as Rosemary
- Shaun O'Hagan as
- Mark Steger as Thin Man
- Kelsey Heller as Young Lori

== Production ==
Plans to film At the Devil's Door were first announced in 2012 under the title Home, shortly after the release of McCarthy's 2012 directorial debut The Pact. Filming was completed in January 2013.

== Reception ==
Rotten Tomatoes, a review aggregator, reports that 43% of 23 surveyed critics gave the film a positive review; the average rating was 6.08/10. The website's critics consensus reads: "At the Devil's Door has no shortage of creepy style -- unfortunately, that isn't enough to distract from an uninspired story that never capitalizes on its potential." Metacritic gave it a weighted average score of 47 out of 100, based on 8 critics, indicating "mixed or average" reviews.

Writing in Variety, Dennis Harvey stopped short of recommending the film, but praised some aspects of it, stating, "Though disappointing content-wise, McCarthy's sophomore feature still demonstrates admirable attention to things that usually suffer in more superficially flashy horror efforts, notably credible real-world backgrounding (the nondescript Southern California locations suggest a middle class slipping haplessly toward poverty), naturalistic perfs, and habit of favoring creepy restraint over “gotcha!” moments. (Still, the pic could have used one or two more of the latter.) Tech and design contributions are likewise thoughtful." Alan Scherstuhl wrote a similar review in The Village Voice, writing, "McCarthy shows he's mastered the things we already know scare us onscreen; next, how about something we don't expect?" Fearnet called At the Devil's Door "impressive work" and remarked that "it works as a slick and admirably unpredictable whole, and it somehow seems to work as three distinct chapters as well."

Best Horror Movie's review said, "When you incorporate three extremely powerful performances from three extremely attractive young ladies (Catalina Sandino Moreno as Leigh, Ashley Rickards as Hannah and Naya Rivera as Vera) you've got a very real recipe for success." EFilmCritic.com praised the performances: "They're good enough to make the end more satisfying than it initially appears after things have sunken in a bit, even if the movie does occasionally seem to be setting up something a little more grandiose." Sound on Sight wrote, "Supporting the scares is a strong cast". Frank Scheck of The Hollywood Reporter wrote, "Creepy atmospherics aren't enough to compensate for the muddled storyline."
