= Naya Rivera =

American actress and singer (1987–2020)

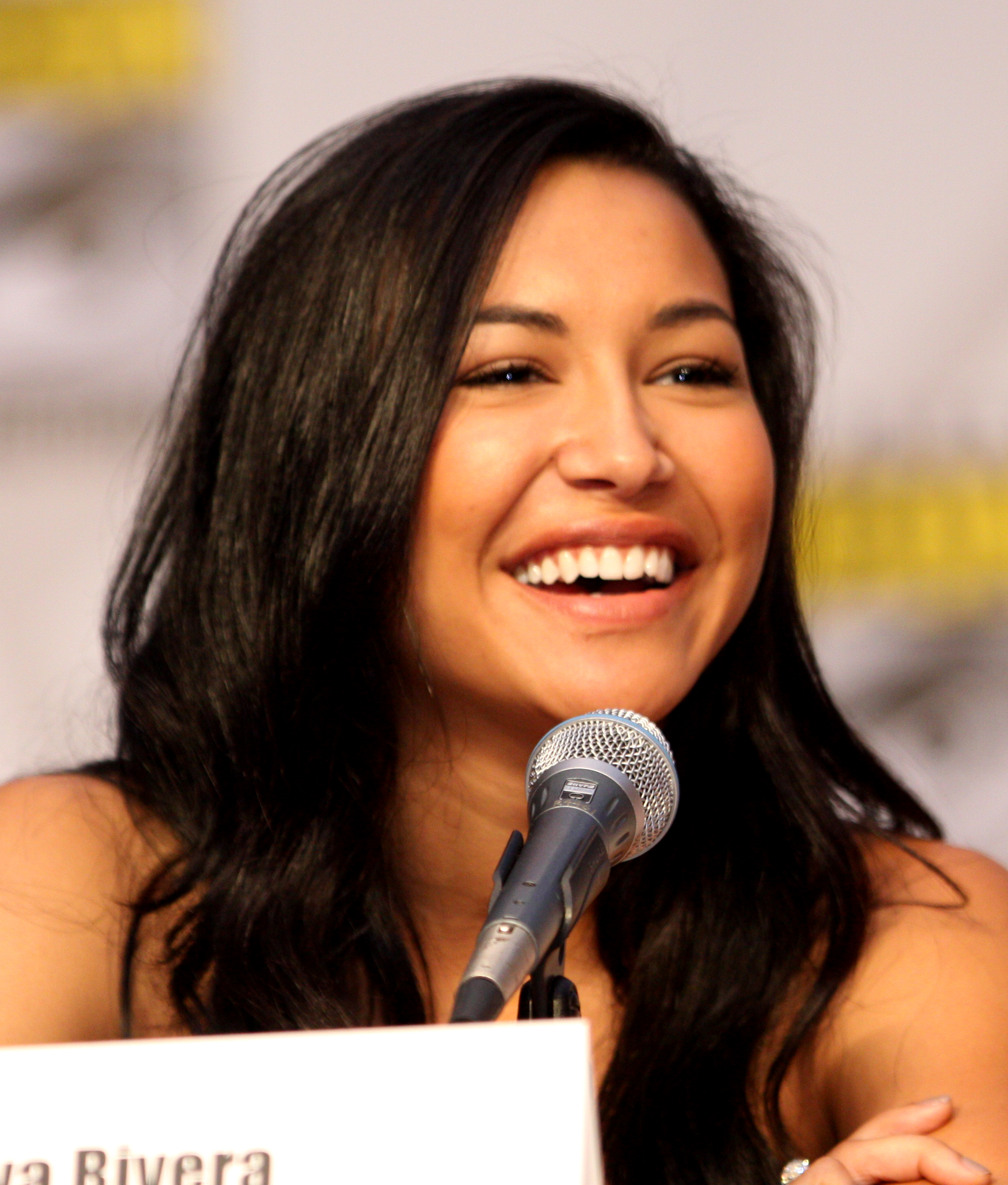
- Rivera at the 2010 San Diego Comic-Con
- Born: Naya Marie Rivera; January 12, 1987; Valencia, California, U.S.
- Died: July 8, 2020 (aged 33) (Note: Rivera was officially pronounced dead on July 13, 2020, after her body was recovered. Her death certificate lists her legal date of death as July 13, 2020, but also notes as part of the cause of death that she died "within minutes", meaning actual date of death was July 8.); Lake Piru, California, U.S.
- Cause of death: Drowning (Note: Rivera's death was ruled an accidental drowning, but her ex-husband, on behalf of their son, and estate brought wrongful death lawsuits against the county and water management services in November 2020.)
- Body discovered: July 13, 2020
- Burial place: Forest Lawn Memorial Park (Hollywood Hills), California
- Other name: Naya Rivera Dorsey
- Occupations: Actress; singer; model
- Years active: 1991–2020
- Spouse: Ryan Dorsey (m. 2014; div. 2018)
- Children: 1
- Relatives: Mychal Rivera (brother)
- Musical career
- Genres: Pop; R&B
- Instruments: Vocals
- Label: Columbia

Naya Marie Rivera (/ˈnaɪə rɪˈvɛərə/ NY-ə riv-AIR-ə; January 12, 1987 – July 8, 2020) was an American actress, singer, and model recognized for her work on the popular musical comedy-drama series Glee. She began her career as a child actress and model, first appearing in national television commercials. At the age of four, she landed the role of Hillary Winston on the short-lived CBS sitcom The Royal Family (1991–1992), earning a nomination for a Young Artist Award at age five. After a series of recurring television roles and then guest spots as a teenager, she got her breakthrough role in 2009 as Santana Lopez on the Fox television series Glee. For the role, she received critical acclaim and various awards, including a SAG Award and ALMA Award, as well as earning nominations with the rest of the cast for a Grammy Award and a Brit Award.

She was signed to Columbia Records as a solo musical artist in 2011 and – despite never releasing a studio album – released a single, "Sorry", in 2013. She won two ALMA Awards as a music artist. On the big screen, Rivera made her debut in the horror film At the Devil's Door (2014) before playing a supporting role in the comedy Mad Families (2017). Besides performing, Rivera championed various charitable causes, particularly for LGBT rights, immigrants' rights, and women's rights. She also spoke out against racism, especially in entertainment. Her personal life garnered significant press and media attention throughout her career, and in 2016 she published a memoir titled Sorry Not Sorry: Dreams, Mistakes, and Growing Up. Because of her varied roles across her three decades as a performer, Rivera is seen as having been a vanguard of Afro-Latino and LGBTQ representation on television.

On July 8, 2020, Rivera drowned at Lake Piru, near Santa Clarita, California, while saving her four-year-old son when their boating trip went awry. Following a five-day search, her body was recovered from the lake on the morning of July 13. At the time of her death, she was between seasons of the television series Step Up, in which she played Collette Jones.

== Early life ==
Naya Marie Rivera was born in Valencia, California, on January 12, 1987. She was raised in Valencia and lived in or around Los Angeles for most of her life. She was of African-American, German, and Puerto Rican descent. (Note: Rivera self-described her race as "one-quarter African-American, one-quarter German and one-half Puerto Rican". Her father is Puerto Rican, while her mother is of African-American and German descent. She said that members of her family migrated from Puerto Rico and Yugoslavia.) When the term "Afro-Latinx" became widespread in the 2010s, she was often identified as such. Her mother, Yolanda Previtire (née White), is a real estate agent and former model, while her father, George Rivera, worked various IT jobs including positions at Disney and Universal Music. Her parents had married in 1986, but divorced in 1996, and her mother was remarried to Charles Previtire in 1999; Rivera was close with her stepfather, but did not really know her grandparents. Her maternal grandmother was Clara White, an abortion counselor and figure in the civil rights movement who was involved in the March on Washington, Selma to Montgomery marches, and 1968 Chicago riots, and who organized protests with and was represented by activist and lawyer Lloyd Barbee.

Rivera did not grow up speaking Spanish at home, but understood it and later learned to speak it. She was the oldest of three children: her younger brother is former NFL tight end Mychal Rivera (b. 1990), and her younger sister is runway model Nickayla Rivera (b. 1994). During the time her parents were married, the family's income would fluctuate dramatically, sometimes allowing them to live lavishly, and other times leaving them struggling; when they were in financial difficulty, Rivera approved the use of some of the money she earned as a child that was set aside in her Coogan account. The family owned a boat and often went boating when Rivera was a child; she still enjoyed boating as an adult and took many trips to Lake Piru near her home, which she considered a "sanctuary".

At 8 or 9 months old, Rivera began to be represented by the same talent agent as her mother, who had moved to Los Angeles to pursue modeling. Rivera was a fan of Michael Jackson from a young age and became friends with one of Jackson's nieces as a child actress on the audition circuit, visiting Neverland Ranch twice (though not with Jackson present). She also met Tupac Shakur as a child; he was a fan of her acting and went over to introduce himself after spotting her family at LAX. Rivera attended Valencia High School in Santa Clarita and graduated in 2005. Her mother had convinced her to join a choir in her freshman year, but she quit it after a few weeks because she was constantly overlooked for classmate Nazanin Mandi. She challenged Mandi to a sing-off for a solo, but Mandi declined and so Rivera left. She had wanted to be a cheerleader, but her family could not afford this. Instead of high school activities, Rivera spent her free time at acting auditions. She suffered with anorexia as a teenager, something she opened up about as an adult. In 2019, Rivera described her high school experience as "terrible", indicating at other times that part of this was her attitude towards education (compared to her career), the lack of coffee served there, and racism.

== Career ==
=== 1991–2008: The Royal Family and early career ===
Rivera appeared in commercials for Kmart as a baby, but her first significant acting job was at the age of four when she appeared as Hillary Winston on the CBS sitcom The Royal Family in 1991. As she could not read the scripts, she learned her lines by reciting and memorizing them. This skill stayed with her, as she was known for learning lines quickly and always performed them perfectly on set. The show received positive reviews and high ratings initially, but star Redd Foxx suffered a fatal heart attack on set in October 1991, which Rivera witnessed; the series was retooled after Foxx's death, but was eventually canceled. Rivera wrote that she and Foxx "were intergenerational BFFs from the moment [they] met", and that she considered him like a grandfather. Watching Foxx die in front of her at a young age affected her career, particularly around filming season finales. She said that on The Royal Family she "fell in love with being on TV"; she received a Young Artist Award nomination for her performance in the series.

As a child and teen actor between 1992 and 2002, Rivera was part of the golden age of black sitcoms, and had roles in The Fresh Prince of Bel-Air, Family Matters, The Jersey, Live Shot, Baywatch, Smart Guy, House Blend, Even Stevens and The Master of Disguise. In 2002, she also appeared in the music video for B2K's "Why I Love You". She then had a guest appearance on The Bernie Mac Show in 2002, before returning to the show for ten episodes throughout its five-season run. Growing up mixed-race in the entertainment industry, she found that her ethnicity could both help and stifle her opportunities; sometimes she found that she could not be typecast by casting directors because she "wasn't Black enough, or Latina enough" and struggled to get roles as either ethnicity, but has also said that she "could play a lot of different ethnicities, from just plain old dark-skinned white girl, to Latino, to African-American", broadening the roles she could audition for. This also concerned her, feeling that she may have been chosen for modeling jobs to be the "ethnic girl". In 2016, she discussed how she still faced racism in casting at this point in her career, using the example of an audition where she was told that the part was instead cast to a white woman because "the size of [her] lips [was] distracting to male execs", saying: "does she know that's racist? I'm Hispanic and black; you can't say that".

As she was getting older, she was featured in episodes of 8 Simple Rules and CSI: Miami. She also recorded music as a teenager, with her father sneaking her into his workplace, and worked with Al B. Sure! at the age of fourteen. By this point, she was working less frequently. In between auditions and roles, Rivera worked jobs as a telemarketer, a nanny, and a greeter at an Abercrombie & Fitch store. In 2006 and 2007, she took part in a production of Mark E. Swinton's play, U Don't Know Me: The Musical, both in Los Angeles and when the production was taken on national tour. She also auditioned for an unspecified season of American Idol during the San Francisco auditions, but was cut in the first round. In March 2008, Rivera began studying screenwriting at New York Film Academy, graduating the same year.

=== 2009–2011: Breakthrough with Glee ===
In 2009, Rivera was cast as Santana Lopez, a high school cheerleader, on Fox's musical comedy series Glee, about a high school glee club. She auditioned for the opportunity "to sing, dance and act all in the same show", and because she was a fan of co-creator Ryan Murphy's previous work on Nip/Tuck. She drew on her own high school experience of unpopularity to prepare for the role, as well as watching films including Mean Girls to "really get in the zone and feel like a bitchy sophomore". Rivera described her character Santana as "a bit of a bad girl" and "your typical high school cheerleader, for the most part", saying that she enjoyed playing Santana because she "always has these really witty one-liners she throws out there". The LA Times wrote that Rivera was "woefully underused for much of Glee's first season", though Santana played a more prominent part in the last nine episodes of it; Rivera said at the time that "Santana's been wreaking havoc with people's boyfriends and people's babies and teachers – she's the high school terror, and she's going to continue to be the villain". Rivera continued as a nanny while working on the first three episodes of Glee, not knowing if they would bring her back; Murphy was so impressed by her that he "convinced the network" to contract her at this point.

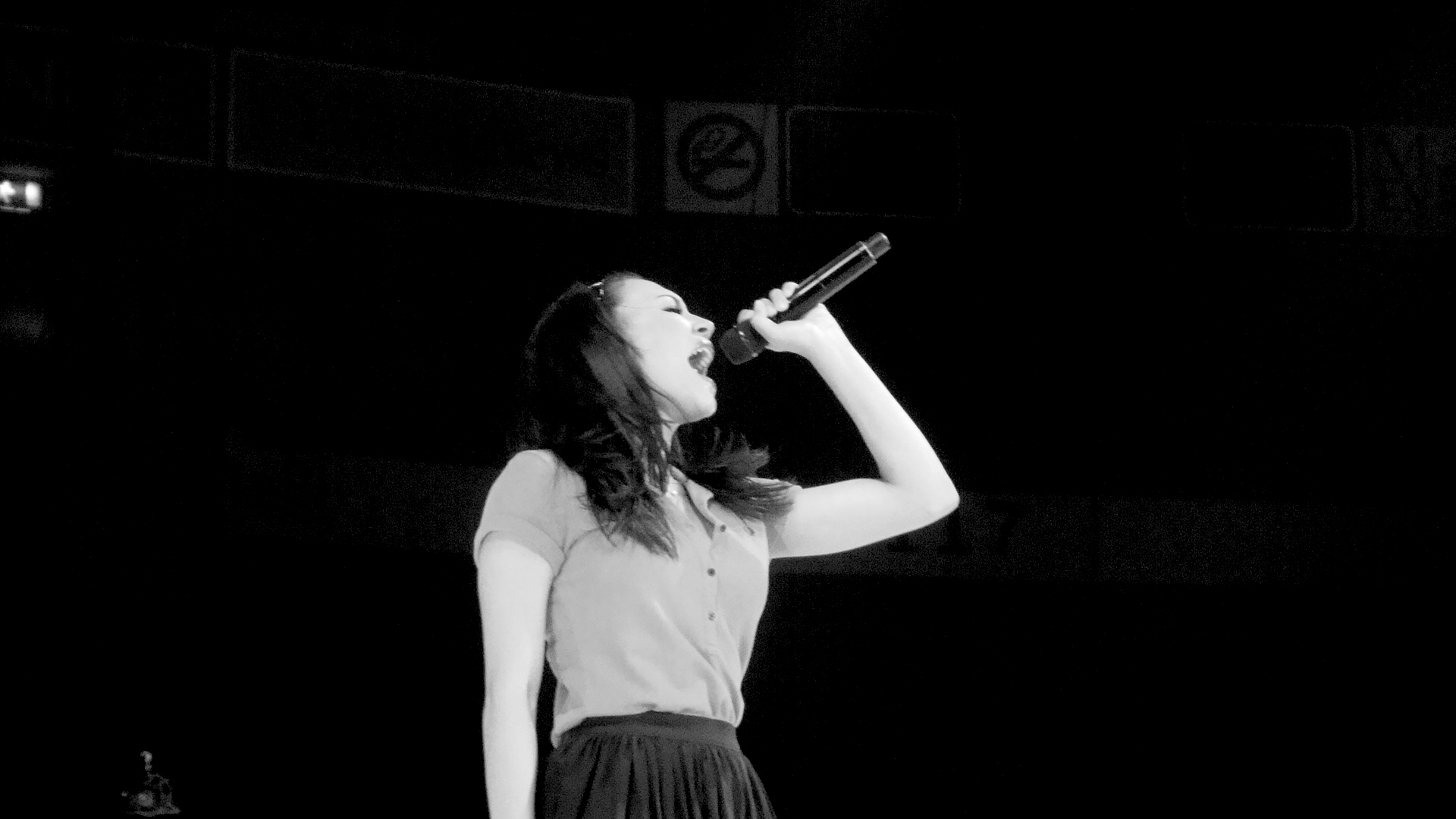
Rivera performing the song "Valerie" in character as Santana Lopez at the Manchester Arena during the Glee concert tour in 2011.

After having her screen time and musical involvement increased in the second half of the first season, Rivera was promoted to series regular as of the beginning of the second season, something said to be earned because her "magnetism on screen was undeniable". She was given her first solo in the fifth episode of season two, "The Rocky Horror Glee Show", and performed several others as the season progressed. During the second season, Rivera's role in the show was radically changed when it was revealed that her character was a lesbian. Rivera portrayed Santana struggling to come to terms with her sexuality, with her love for her best friend, and with her inability to come out of the closet. Rivera spoke about the development of this aspect of her character, saying that it was first thought up by the writers as a "funny little thing" for a quick punchline; the actress pushed for the sexuality and relationship to be taken seriously. She received favorable reviews for her performance and is celebrated for the representation that Santana and her portrayal of the character provide; (Note: See section on Representation and legacy.) one feature on Rivera's legacy said that "in a landscape starved of representation, Santana was an oasis. A bold, well-rounded, hilarious woman of colour who was openly and unapologetically gay". In 2013, Santana's second season coming-out scene was described as "one of the hallmarks of the entire series". In relation to the show, Rivera was a guest mentor on The Glee Project's second season episode "Sexuality", and in January 2011, she appeared in a Funny or Die parody of "Nuthin' but a 'G' Thang", called "Nuthin' But a Glee Thang", which had been co-written by her Glee co-star Heather Morris. Rivera and Morris played girlfriends and ultimately wives on the show; Rivera said that the pair were comfortable filming intimate scenes, but that these became awkward because "all the guys wanted to visit the set". They remained close friends until Rivera's death.

In 2011, Rivera won her first ALMA Award for Favorite Female Music Artist; she won two more in 2012, in the categories of Favorite TV Actress – Leading Role in a Comedy and Female Music Artist. She received a great amount of critical praise for both her acting and her singing performances in the latter part of season two and the beginning of season three of Glee. As 2011 ended, she or her character were on many "Best Of" lists, including HitFix's 25 Breakout Stars of 2011, TV Guide's Best Performances of 2011, and MTV's Best TV Characters of 2011. In 2020, Santana appeared on the Thrillist list of the 100 Greatest TV Characters of the 21st Century, ranking at number 85 and the only Glee character included. In the third season, Rivera's character Santana was outed and began to publicly accept her sexuality, giving Rivera more complex and emotional storylines. She also performed a duet with Ricky Martin, and worked with Gloria Estefan, who was cast as Santana's mother. Estefan said that she studied Rivera's performance as inspiration for her own character, explaining: "I already knew [Santana] was very sarcastic, but [she] also has a heart, [...] So her mother had to be tough as nails, but with that little sarcastic edge", while also being supportive. Discussing Emmy nominations in 2012, Collider said that Rivera was "arguably the only bright spot" of the season. Study Breaks highlighted that while Santana had impactful storylines about her sexuality, she strayed from the "popular trope" of queer characters being defined by their queerness, as "she also stars in many other storylines in the show. The writers of Glee make it abundantly clear that Santana is a lesbian, but she is also a fierce, motivated dreamer who loves and loses like everyone else", with the article adding that her "firm sense of self goes beyond her race and sexuality".

As the 64th Primetime Emmy Awards approached in 2012, Rivera was listed by many critics and media outlets as deserving of a nomination; The Hollywood Reporter included her in their "Emmys 2012: Supporting Players" photoshoot, the annual class photo of the 25 top contenders across the various Supporting performance categories, and she was honored by media outlets like E!, HitFix, and TV Guide. She was chosen by the Television Academy to host the "Countdown to the Emmys" video for the then-upcoming awards ceremony, a video introduction to each year's ceremony that is watched by an estimated 25 million people. For the awards, Rivera submitted the Glee episode "Mash Off" for consideration in the Outstanding Supporting Actress in a Comedy Series category (an episode that had generated much Emmy attention) because it "was so well rounded. [Glee is] a comedy but [she] also got to show off some dramatic aspects of the character" in it. Despite this, Rivera was not nominated for an Emmy in 2012, nor in her career, with the media generally considering this a snub; The Daily Beast argued that she and other actors were overlooked because of their characters being young, while in 2020, Television Academy received criticism for years of Latin under-representation at the Emmys.

=== 2012–2014: Musical solo debut and film debut ===
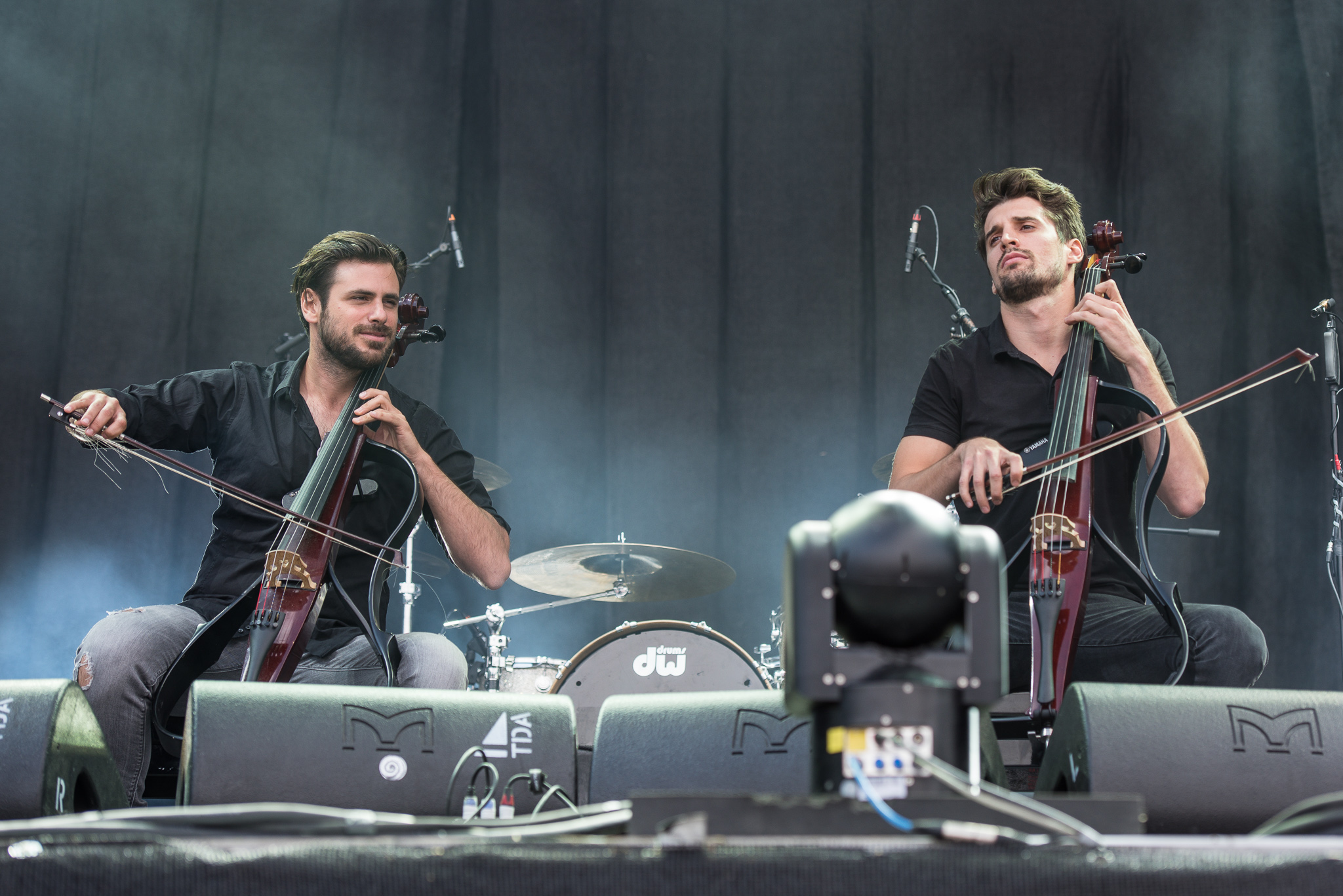
Rivera released two singles with Croatian cellist duo 2Cellos.

Rivera remained in a principal role on Glee in its fourth and fifth seasons from 2012 to 2014. While working on the later seasons of Glee, Rivera undertook other projects. In May 2011, it was announced that she had signed a deal with Columbia Records to produce a solo album; she said she had "been waiting for this day ever since [she] was a little girl" and that "it's always been [her] dream to release [her] own music". In 2012, the musical duo 2Cellos released the second single to their second album, a cover of Muse's "Supermassive Black Hole" featuring vocals by Rivera. She also starred in the music video for the song. Rivera and 2Cellos had first met and worked together with Grant Gustin for a song featured on Glee, with the cellists thinking that Rivera's "sexy voice" would be perfect for their Muse cover. At a point in the early production of the 2012 movie adaptation of The Hunger Games, Rivera had been considered for the role of Katniss Everdeen, a part she did not get, and was later a favorite to be cast as Johanna Mason in the sequel Catching Fire, a role she said she "would love to play".

When the fourth season of Glee went into production, Rivera expressed a desire for more of her character's family to be shown and for her to have more Spanish dialogue to "really celebrate the culture", saying that there should be more Latin characters; as it began airing she said that Santana was "in limbo" and directionless. Vulture said that Rivera was "the best part of [the fourth season], even if she hasn't been in every episode"; Santana's stories included separating with Morris' character Brittany and moving to New York City. In the summer of 2013, Complex described her as "the biggest star on the [show]" with her own "cult-like fan base". Production of the fifth season of Glee was briefly postponed following the death of actor Cory Monteith as it was due to begin filming in July 2013; Rivera was close to Monteith and provided a statement that said he "always will be a part of [her] own family", as well as leading a moment of silence for him at the Giffoni Film Festival on July 24, 2013. In the fifth season, Santana embarks on a new relationship with Demi Lovato's character Dani before returning to Brittany, though Rivera did not appear in the season finale.

Rivera's debut single "Sorry", featuring rapper Big Sean, was released as a digital download on September 17, 2013. While her most popular performances on Glee were softer ballads, she chose to write "something a little more glossy and soulful" for her own music and worked with her own team, including Glee drummer John Lock, rather than go with Columbia's suggestions; she said she told the label: "This is what I'm doing. Get on or get off. I think ["Sorry"] is a summer song, and I want it on the radio by the end of the summer". The single quickly reached the top 40 on the Billboard Rhythmic chart and the top 10 of the iTunes download chart. However, production on the album "kind of halted" due to "so many things going on". Rivera said: "Politics got involved so I've been putting it on the back burner". During this period she starred in an M&M's commercial titled "Love Ballad" that aired during Super Bowl XLVII on February 3, 2013, as the girlfriend of the anthropomorphic "Red" M&M character, and voiced a rebellious reindeer character called Sparkle in the 2013 Christmas movie The Naughty List, for which she won a voice acting award.

At the Devil's Door, Rivera's debut feature film, in which she played the lead role of Vera, premiered at the South by Southwest Film Festival in Austin, Texas, on March 9, 2014. The film has been described by its director, Nicholas McCarthy, as "a unique kind of genre film I think, almost like a Rubik's Cube of a horror movie". Rivera explained that "there wasn't much screaming. It's not a jumpy film." The film was released through video on demand on August 8, 2014, and theatrically released on September 12, 2014. It continued to play at festivals, receiving mixed reviews. Rivera's acting, however, received praise. Edgar Chaput of Sound on Sight called Rivera "the standout [and] the most natural performance in the film", and Marsha McCreadie of Film Journal wrote that the film "doesn't pick up steam until late in the story, when Rivera carries the narrative". Diabolique magazine's Jeremy Kibler wrote: "Coming primarily from a TV background and fun to watch [...] the eye-grabbing Naya Rivera adjusts to the big screen with ease in front of the camera. Her Vera is headstrong and rigid but cut with just the right amount of vulnerability".

On May 1, 2014, it was reported that Columbia had dismissed Rivera because her debut single had underperformed, but Rivera's representative released a statement to news outlets stating that such claims were false, and they may pursue legal action to ensure Rivera's creditability. Rivera subsequently worked on a project with Guillermo Díaz, directing a short film PSA about the effect of immigration on children and their parents. Díaz's part of the project focuses on telling the stories of young DREAMers and the fear they have of their mothers being deported, and Rivera's part explores the culture of immigrants in the United States. The film is visually very stylized, and incorporates 360-degree shots. Rivera told Buzzfeed at the time that "immigration shows how beautiful America is as a country, how diverse it is [...] it's what you get when you have different cultures in one place. If everybody thought that way, [immigration] would be more of a no-brainer".

=== 2015–2020: Return to television ===
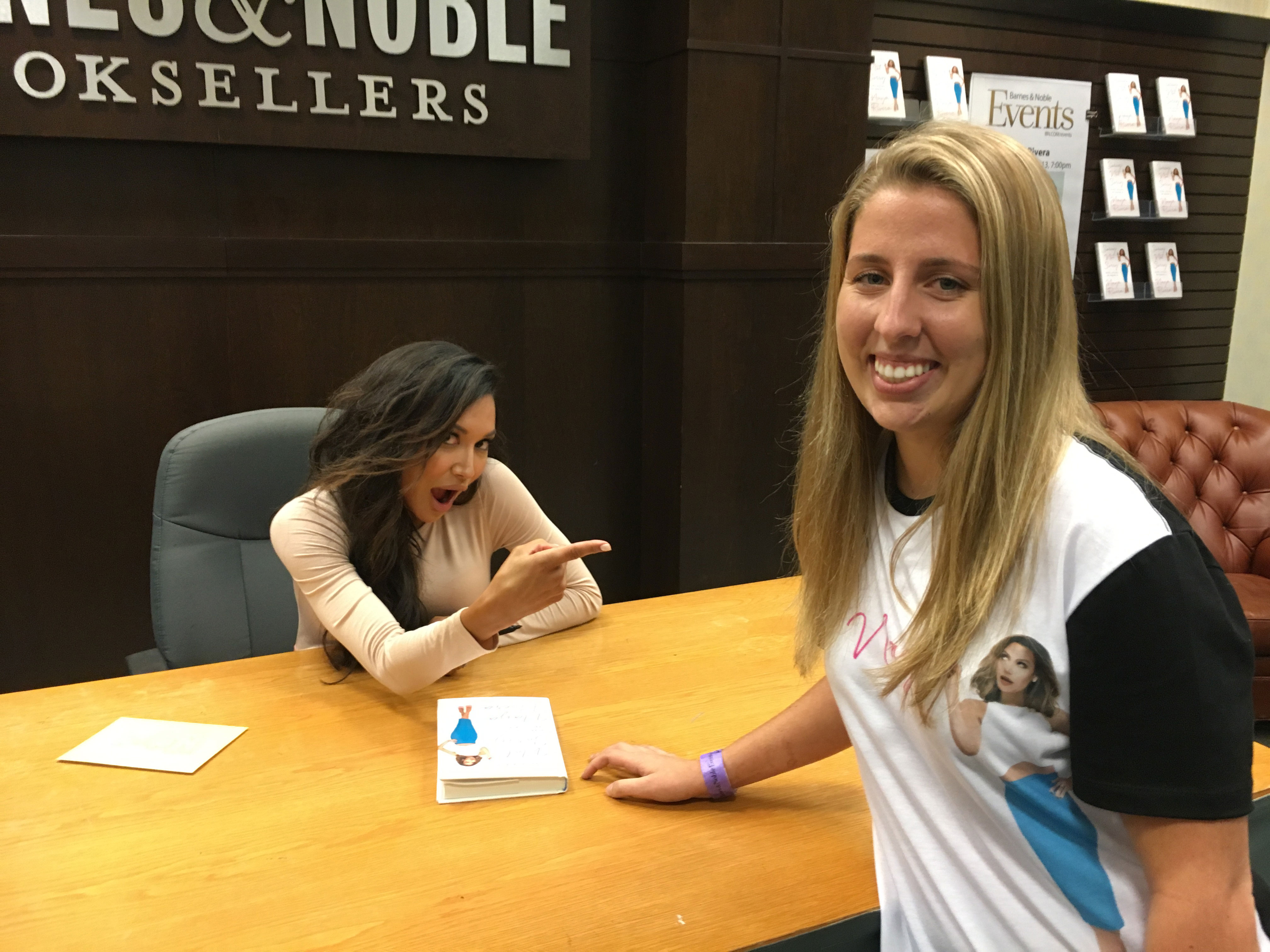
Rivera posing with a fan at a book signing in 2016 at The Grove. In a 2016 interview she said: "I am from LA and if you're from LA, you know you made it if you get a book signing at the Barnes & Noble at The Grove, bitch".

In 2015, Rivera portrayed the recurring role of Blanca Alvarez in the third season of Lifetime's drama series Devious Maids, and from 2014 to 2015 was a recurring guest host of The View. She appeared in the final season of Glee in 2015, but had asked for her role to be reduced so that she could focus on other work. She was initially set to only host a few episodes of The View, but her appearances all produced "soundbites that have gone viral" and gave the show a boost on social media; it was reported that the producers were considering "bigger plans" for Rivera before she was made a more regular guest host. Rivera was the first person considered for the role of Blanca on Devious Maids, as the producers were "very interested in having a name actress play the role"; they initially did not really think that Rivera would be interested. Showrunner Brian Tanen described the character as "pivotal". Mitchel Broussard for We Got This Covered said that she was "maybe [the] most interesting" part of the season, and that her storyline "oozed the show's telenovela origins". Rivera was also working on music with Gloria Estefan around this time after having met on Glee; Rivera's pregnancy "sidetracked" this partnership and they did not produce anything.

Rivera wrote a memoir called Sorry Not Sorry: Dreams, Mistakes, and Growing Up, published in September 2016, which was something she had decided to do while hosting The View and being suddenly struck when an audience member asked her what it was like to be a role model, feeling that she was in Santana's shadow. She decided to reveal more about her life and choices so that she could better feel like she deserved the title. Jarett Wieselman of BuzzFeed News wrote at the time of its release that the book was important to Rivera because "she was very pregnant when Glee ended, so it was basically impossible to capitalize on the show's momentum", but she could still write. After the birth of her son in September 2015, Rivera chose to take some time off acting to spend with him because of the disruptive lifestyle that comes with filming for television. She returned with a secondary character role in another film, Mad Families, in 2017. The film focuses on three families (one white, one Latino, and one African-American) being forced together on a camping trip, with Rivera's "peacemaker" character Felipa being involved with both the Latino and Black families. In 2018, she auditioned for the role of Anita in the 2021 remake of West Side Story with the song "America", a song and role that she had performed on Glee.

Rivera was announced as part of the cast for the YouTube Red series Step Up: High Water in 2017, taking the leading role of school administrator and dance instructor Collette Jones, alongside Ne-Yo and Faizon Love. The show's executive producer, Adam Shankman, had directed Rivera in the Glee episode "The Rocky Horror Glee Show" and helped her prepare for her first solo in it. He said that Rivera took the leading role in Step Up as "a favor" to him before becoming "the mother of [the] whole cast" and the show's "North Star". Showrunner Holly Sorensen recalled that Collette was one of the last characters to be cast; Shankman called Rivera as soon as she was discussed for the role and Rivera was immediately enthusiastic. Rivera said during the second season that the show felt like home in the way making Glee did. The series moved to Starz in May 2020, and Rivera was announced to be continuing her role; at the time, the third season was in production, but no timetable for its release was given. Sorensen said Rivera was "more excited than she's ever been for a season of TV". After Rivera's death, Deadline reported that the third season would be rewritten, but "not right away" as the series took a production hiatus to allow the cast and crew to process Rivera's death.

In 2019, it had been reported that the comic Batman: The Long Halloween was being adapted into a two-part animated film for DC Universe Animated Original Movies, with Rivera voicing Catwoman. The first part was released on June 22, 2021, and is dedicated in her memory; the second part was released a month later.

== Public image ==
During her career, Rivera appeared on the covers of several magazines, including Cosmopolitan, Maxim, Rolling Stone, FHM, Complex, Glow, Prestige, The Hollywood Reporter, Cosmo for Latinas, Latina, Fit Pregnancy and Baby and Galore. She was highly ranked on various magazines' most attractive lists. She made the Maxim Hot 100 list in 2010, 2011, and 2012, being ranked number 27 in 2012. For two years, in 2011 and 2012, she was ranked at number one on AfterEllen.com's "Hot 100" list, ranking at number three in 2013. In 2012 she was selected by People en Español for their 50 Most Beautiful list, and was listed on FHM's 100 Sexiest Women list, coming in at number 39. In May 2013, she posed nude in an issue of Allure magazine.

Rivera was named one of The Hollywood Reporter's 35 under 35 Latinos in Entertainment in September 2012, and in October 2012 she was featured in the third episode of MTV's series This Is How I Made It. In the episode, Rivera recounted her childhood career as an actress and a model, as well as the lean times that came between the age of 16 and 21, leading up to her big break when cast on Glee. In 2013, Complex described her as "the rarest of Hollywood types: a young starlet who's genuinely down-to-earth." In December 2011 she was named a celebrity spokesperson for Proactiv, and became a brand ambassador for hair loss solution brand NIOXIN in March 2017, after experiencing hair loss after giving birth.

== Representation and legacy ==
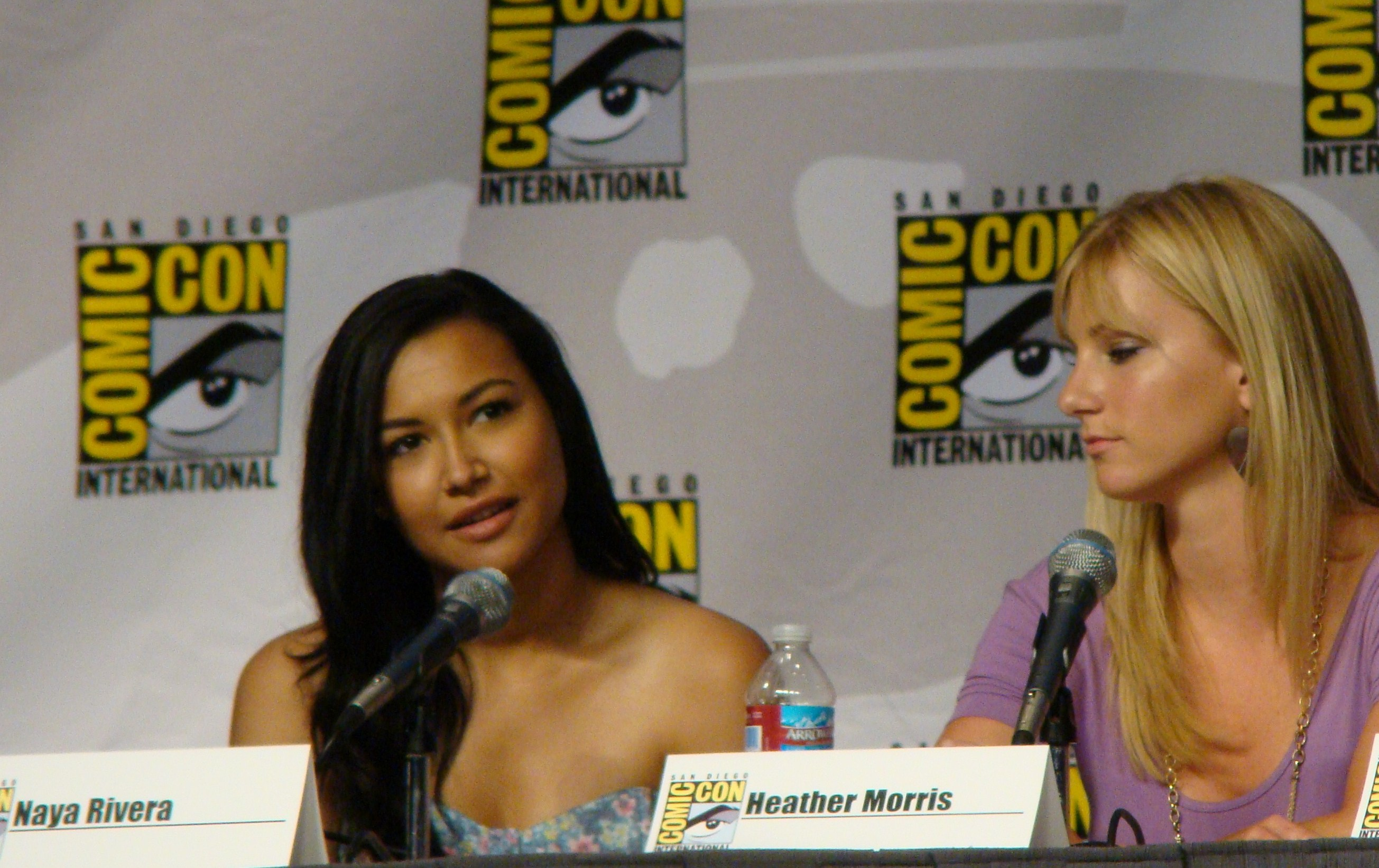
Rivera and Heather Morris at the 2010 San Diego Comic-Con. The actresses played a couple on Glee; in 2013, Rivera told Latina: "There are very few ethnic LGBT characters on television, so I am honored to represent them".

With her diverse acting roles, Rivera is seen as having been one of the earliest, most prominent, and most profound examples of both Afro-Latino representation and queer Latinx (as Santana in Glee) representation on prime time television. Rivera has been described as a gay icon and "a true icon for all black and brown girls". In 2011, the president of GLAAD said that Rivera's storyline as Santana was "one that hasn't been told on a prime-time network television show at that level, particularly by an LGBT teen of color". Multiple scholarly works were written during Rivera's lifetime focusing on the important changes that, particularly, her portrayal of Santana brought to television with non-stereotypical stories in relation to race and sexuality – including a novel coming out story and relationship, Latinidad, and not being explicitly black- or white- coded – as well as being a minority involved in main storylines not focused on such identities. (Note: A selection of such books includes Narratives at the Beginning of the 3rd Millennium eds. Homberg-Schramm, Rasokat, Schweiker; Latinos and Narrative Media: Participation and Portrayal ed. Aldama; The Palgrave Handbook of Sexuality Education eds. Allen, Rasmussen; Queer in the Choir Room: Essays on Gender and Sexuality in Glee ed. Parke; and Glee and new directions for social change eds. Johnson, Faill. Journal coverage includes Sexuality & Culture (2013; vol. 17, issue 3).) In her 2013 chapter of one such work, Isabel Molina-Guzmán added that Rivera played "the first lesbian Latina on primetime television [and thus was] honored for her compassionate and complex representation".

In industry tributes after her death, NBC wrote that Rivera "[redefined] queer and Afro-Latino representation on TV"; Lionsgate wrote that her "remarkable contributions to our industry created a lasting memory"; Digital Spy said that "Naya Rivera's impact was nothing short of groundbreaking"; and NME called her a "trailblazer [who] leaves behind an enormously powerful legacy". Erika Abad, a professor of Gender and sexuality studies and scholar of Latinx studies, wrote that "Naya Rivera's characters provided solidarity and visibility, [her] career [and] diverse roles [showcase] the demand to support and build upon Afro-Latinx storylines". Similarly, Esquire wrote that "in such a short time, Rivera managed to shape a landscape and be part of measurable change".

Naya Rivera's Santana Lopez started out as an antagonist. Mean, messy, complicated. All the things Latinx women often don't get to be in prime-time television [...] Naya shattered the tropes and gifted the audience with a complex, queer, Black Puerto Rican woman. Naya imbued Santana with equal parts resolve and vulnerability, and she quickly became a hero herself when Santana disclosed she was a lesbian. Naya served as a vessel for truth and by doing so brilliantly cracked the lid wide open on the possibilities of what Afro-Latinx representation could look like on TV. [...] She quietly inspired all of us Afro-Latinx storytellers to craft characters that center our identities authentically and unapologetically.

— Steven Canals for Entertainment Weekly, 2020

Various journalists and television creatives wrote that Rivera merely appearing on-screen as an Afro-Latina was impactful, before the representation grew as her character Santana developed. Refinery29's Ariana Romero elaborated on the impact of Rivera appearing on television with her darker skin tone, noting that, even in 2020, shows with prominent Afro-Latinx performers – with the exception of Pose – are mostly canceled after one season, and that other queer Latinx characters exist as "one extremely restrictive vision" in which they "are all fairer-skinned" and have personalities that fit a stereotypical mold, while "Santana looks nothing like these [other characters]. She acts like them even less". Ms. noted that though there was much more queer representation by 2020, Rivera's push for Santana's relationship to be handled well marks the character as "one of the few lesbian characters to ultimately have a happy ending". A BBC retrospective in 2020 looked at the impact of Rivera's role as Santana in providing important representation, internationally, for young queer women and the idea of being out in the music industry. The article did note that casting a straight actress for the role may have been frowned upon in later years, but that having the representation was revolutionary at the time and it was positive that Rivera openly embraced playing the lesbian character.

Queer media journalist Dana Piccoli wrote a tribute feature on the actress's legacy for NBC, saying: "I don't use the word "legacy" lightly. But Rivera and her beloved Glee character, Santana Lopez, helped change queer television history". Piccoli and other journalists stated that later examples of representation, like Elena Alvarez in One Day at a Time and characters in Vida, are attributable to Rivera's role, and the executive editor of them., Whembley Sewell, said when interviewed on the subject by NPR that "what [LGBTQ people of color] are going to create and put out into the world because [Rivera] gave us what she did is going to be so, so incredible". Steven Canals – a co-creator of the 2018 show Pose, which is set in queer African-American and Latinx culture – wrote that he will "never be able to articulate the importance of seeing Naya [Rivera], a Black Puerto Rican, portraying a queer Afro-Latina on prime-time TV" at the time. In 2025, Rivera's performance as Santana ranked 78th in Variety's "The 100 Greatest TV Performances of the 21st Century" list, the only Glee performer represented.

== Personal life ==
=== Relationships and family ===
Rivera dated actor Tahj Mowry between 2000 and 2004, after having first met shooting a commercial when Rivera was four and later working together on Smart Guy in the 1990s. She remained close with Tahj and his family, particularly his sisters, Tia and Tamera Mowry, for many years, once helping the sisters find an apartment when they got kicked out of their house and appearing on Tia Mowry at Home in 2017. In an Instagram tribute post on July 12, 2020, after Rivera was declared missing, Mowry wrote that he never stopped loving Rivera. Between 2008 and 2010, Rivera dated Glee co-star Mark Salling. The two had a rocky relationship and ultimately split at the request of Salling's publicist; she later said that Salling breaking up with her felt like "the worst thing ever" at the time. Salling was arrested in 2015 for possessing child pornography; in her book (written before Salling's subsequent suicide), Rivera expressed that she was not "totally shocked" at this, but it still took her by surprise. She then briefly dated actor Ryan Dorsey, whom she would later marry. In her memoir, Rivera revealed that she had an abortion in 2010, shortly after splitting from Dorsey, due to the fact that her career was taking off with the success of Glee; she did not tell Dorsey about the abortion until they got back together in 2014, and said that he was supportive and respectful when she did. She wrote about the abortion in her book "[to use] her platform [to] tackle the stigma".

In April 2013, Rivera began dating recording artist Big Sean. The couple announced their engagement in October 2013, but split up in April 2014. While they were together, Big Sean rapped about her in his featured part on the track "All Me" by Drake. In her memoir, Rivera wrote that she found out their relationship was over "at the same time as the rest of the world" when Big Sean published the news on the internet. After they broke up, she asked Big Sean not to write a song about her; this instead encouraged him to do so, and he added verses about Rivera to a song he was writing called "I Don't Fuck with You", which became the lead single from his 2015 album Dark Sky Paradise. The song peaked at number 1 on the US Hot R&B/Hip-Hop Songs and at number 11 on the US Billboard Hot 100. Rivera performed the song on a 2018 episode of Lip Sync Battle, seen as shading him. In 2017, Big Sean released another diss track about Rivera, "No More Interviews", which In Touch Weekly said "really takes aim at Naya's neck".

Soon after her split from Big Sean, Rivera rekindled her relationship with Ryan Dorsey and they were married in Cabo San Lucas, Mexico, on July 19, 2014; they did not announce the engagement or wedding until July 23. In February 2015, Rivera announced that she and Dorsey were expecting their first child. Their son was born on September 17, 2015. Rivera was raising her son as bilingual in Spanish and English, having improved her own knowledge of Spanish with this intention. In November 2016, she filed for divorce from Dorsey after two years of marriage, but called off the separation in October 2017. During this separation she was linked with actor David Spade. In late November 2017, Rivera was arrested and charged in Kanawha County, West Virginia, with misdemeanor domestic battery against Dorsey after she allegedly hit him in the head during an altercation over their child; she was released and picked up from the courthouse by her father-in-law. She subsequently refiled for divorce in December 2017, and in January 2018 the domestic battery charge was dismissed at the request of Dorsey, who "notified both the prosecution and the defense counsel that he was no longer seeking prosecution and has confirmed he was never at any time injured by the conduct of Ms. Rivera". On June 14, 2018, Rivera and Dorsey finalized their divorce, sharing joint custody, with both waiving rights to child support. The joint custody agreement was modified in March 2020, giving Rivera primary custody while stipulating Dorsey "be afforded frequent and meaningful custodial contact"; after Rivera's death, Dorsey took sole custody. Rivera was in a relationship with retired soccer player Jermaine Jones in 2020.

In January 2015, during an appearance as a guest host on The View, Rivera suggested "that she might be bisexual". In the episode, Rosie O'Donnell remarked on a study showing that bisexual women were more likely to have mental health problems than lesbians, to which Rivera replied: "Rosie, no wonder I'm crazy. This just solves it all". Esquire wrote after her death that "Rivera never disclosed her real-life sexuality", and Gay Times included her and character Santana on their list of "beloved LGBTQ+ characters who were actually played by LGBTQ+ actors".

=== Philanthropy and advocacy ===
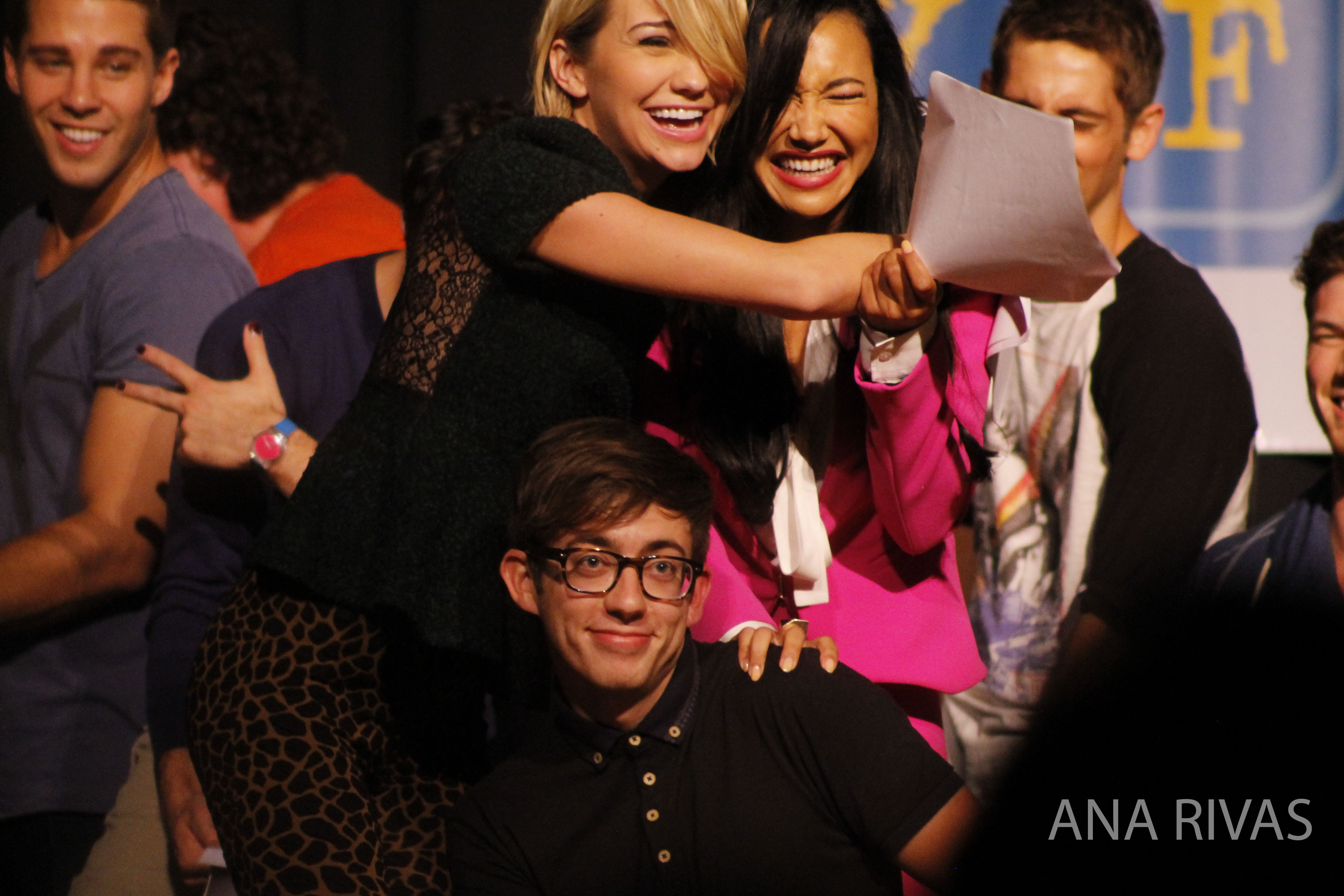
Rivera performing at the Young Storytellers "The Biggest Show" in 2012 with other actors from Glee and Baby Daddy.

Rivera notably supported various charities, particularly for the LGBTQ+ community and immigrants. She dedicated her time to organizations including GLAAD, Stand Up to Cancer, The Trevor Project, The Elephant Project, The Sunshine Foundation, I Am an Immigrant, Alliance of Moms, Point Foundation, the Thirst Project, FEED, Los Angeles Mission, Get Schooled, and Kindred Foundation. In 2009 she said: "I feel like [...] participating in charity events or giving back to the community [...] is really important to do because I feel like I am so blessed with my job and my life right now that I would love to take time to bowl for a cause. I hope to raise money to help some other people that are in a really tough situation." Her publicist from her time on Glee described Rivera as "ahead of her time" in terms of being an advocate, saying that she "really wanted to use her platform and her voice for good, whether it was for anti-bullying, for equal rights, for women of color, she wanted to use this role to help talk about a bigger message".

Best known for lesbian character Santana, Rivera also championed LGBTQ+ rights off-screen. In May 2011, she hosted the San Francisco GLAAD Media Awards, and on March 24, 2012, she hosted the event again, this time in New York City as a co-host with Glee co-star Cory Monteith. Along with John Stamos, a guest star on the show, both hosts auctioned off kisses to the crowd, raising $15,000. In December 2012 she attended the annual Trevor Live! event, where she performed a cover of the song "Silent Night", and for Pride Month in 2017 she was invited to write for Billboard, composing "Love Letter to the LGBTQ Community", thanking fans for embracing her character and reiterating her active support for the community.

In other charitable endeavors, Rivera volunteered at Los Angeles area food banks and homeless shelters and the Foothill AIDS Project in 2009, and performed with Amber Riley at the 10th Annual Celebration of Dreams Event for the Dream Foundation in November 2011. In October 2012, along with other members of the Glee cast, Rivera took part in "The Biggest Show", a performance of young writers' scripts for the literacy non-profit Young Storytellers.

Rivera's favorite charity was Alexandria House, a women's shelter in Los Angeles, which she organized fundraisers for and volunteered at during 2019 and 2020. After her death, a GoFundMe drive she had started for Alexandria House saw an influx of donations in her memory. On June 5, 2020, Rivera attended a Black Lives Matter protest, on what would have been Breonna Taylor's birthday. She gave her support to Black Lives Matter on other occasions. In August 2020, Entertainment Tonight announced that, to "continue [honoring] Rivera's legacy", they would be promoting some of the causes closest to the late star. In December 2020, members of the Glee cast launched a campaign called Snixxmas to benefit Alexandria House, continuing a Christmas charity tradition Rivera had started among their friends.

A lifelong Democrat, Rivera performed with the cast of Glee at the White House during the first Obama administration, as well as with Amber Riley and Darren Criss at his second inauguration. She campaigned with Everyone Votes and Rock the Vote in 2016 to promote voter participation and took part in a Funny or Die celebrity campaign song ("Holy Shit (You've Got to Vote)") that supported Hillary Clinton.

=== Religion ===
Rivera wrote about her religion in her memoir, and was a lifelong Christian. Her mother became very religious for a period during Rivera's childhood, and from the age of seven until her teens she recalls that she and her brother were only allowed to listen to Christian music; in junior high school talent shows she would perform Christian songs, which "didn't really bring the house down". There was no apprehension from Rivera or her family about her lesbian storyline on Glee, with Rivera saying that her mother is "the most nonjudgmental, cool person". Rivera explained that she had always felt comfortable with her Christianity and would particularly return to it in stressful times during her career, highlighting a point in 2014 when she was receiving negative media attention after it was rumored that she had been fired from Glee in the same week Big Sean broke up with her, saying that to move on she "had to just be with [herself], and with God".

== Disappearance and death ==
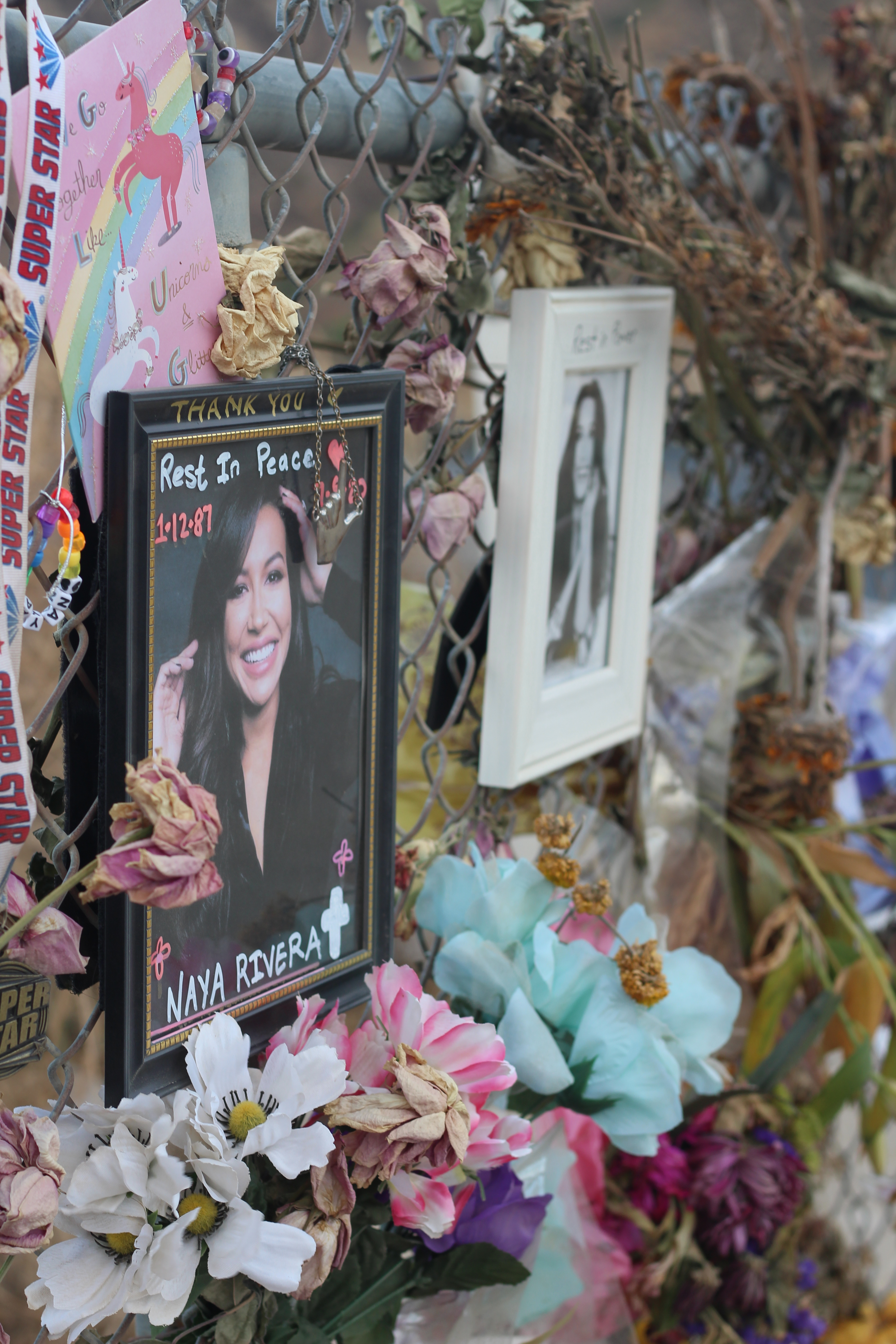
Memorial for Rivera at Lake Piru

On July 8, 2020, Rivera was declared a missing person after her four-year-old son was found alone in a boat that Rivera had rented at Lake Piru, a reservoir in the Los Padres National Forest in Ventura County, California. Rivera had been visiting the lake for years, and was considered a strong swimmer. The search for both Rivera and her son had begun at 4:00 p.m. PDT, three hours after they left the dock, when their rental was over and they had not returned. Her son was found alone, asleep on the boat with his life jacket on, around 5:00 p.m. Her son told investigators that he and Rivera were swimming when she told him to get back onto the boat. Police reports state that he recalled that she helped him climb back into the boat but was unable to climb back onboard herself and then disappeared underwater, while Ryan Dorsey's lawsuit claims that his son climbed aboard unaided while Rivera struggled to do the same. Both accounts state that he watched his mother reaching up and calling out for help; he searched for a rope on the boat to help while she was struggling. He also stated that his mother was not wearing a life jacket.

The next day, the Ventura County Sheriff's Office confirmed to NBC that Rivera was presumed dead and that rescue efforts would shift to recovery efforts. On July 11 and 12, 2020, Rivera's parents and stepfather, brother, ex-husband Ryan Dorsey and close friend and co-star Heather Morris joined the search team at the lake, and the sheriff's office dissuaded more civilians from trying to search because of dangerous terrain. On July 13, 2020, it was announced that a body had been found by divers in Lake Piru when the search resumed in the morning; the body was confirmed to be Rivera's at a press conference held later that day. The sheriff suggested that Rivera and her son may have found themselves caught in a rip current and struggled to get back to the boat, saying that she likely "mustered enough energy to save her son, but not enough to save herself". On July 14, 2020, the Ventura County medical examiner released an autopsy report stating that the cause of death was an accidental drowning and that there was no evidence of injury or intoxication. Rivera was interred at the Forest Lawn Memorial Park in Hollywood Hills following a private service on July 24, 2020.

=== Reactions ===
When people die young it really hurts, because we lose them and also their potential. [Rivera] was a guiding light for all of us struggling for more diversity and representation.

— Jack Rico, NBC and Telemundo journalist

Fans of Rivera posted messages of support during the time of her disappearance, and tributes after she was found dead. Her family thanked them for the "outpouring of love" in a message shared on July 15, 2020. Rivera's ex-husband Dorsey made no public statement until after Rivera's funeral, when he posted on Instagram to say that he was still finding her death hard to believe, but that having their son makes coping easier; her boyfriend Jones had made an Instagram post on the day her body was found, expressing his grief while focusing on Rivera's love for her son. Prominent politicians and performers from across music, television, film, and theatre, also shared messages in her memory. A memorial to Rivera was constructed under the Lake Piru sign in the days after her death. Lake Piru remained closed to the public for over a month after Rivera's death, and swimming became prohibited.

Rivera's Glee co-stars also paid tribute, and the show's creators, Ryan Murphy, Ian Brennan, and Brad Falchuk, announced their plans to start a college fund for Rivera's son. Heather Morris posted photos of their sons together, calling her a "consistent and loving friend" who was the "strongest and most resilient human being [she knew]". Amber Riley performed a tribute to Rivera on the August 27, 2020, episode of Jimmy Kimmel Live!. The media noted that Rivera's body was found on the anniversary of the death of her Glee co-star and close friend, Cory Monteith seven years earlier; a tribute she had sung for him, the song "If I Die Young", saw a surge in views, and other cast members of the show made social media posts commemorating both actors. Monteith's mother, Ann McGregor, also posted a tribute, writing how much Rivera's friendship had meant to her son and their family and saying, "We'll carry you in our hearts forever. We miss you. Friends reunited for eternity".

== Filmography ==
Film
Year	Title	Role	Notes	Ref.
2002	The Master of Disguise	Captain America Kid		
2009	Frankenhood	Hottie		
2011	Glee: The 3D Concert Movie	Santana Lopez		
2013	The Naughty List	Sparkle	Voice	
2014	At the Devil's Door	Vera		
2017	Mad Families	Felipa Jonas		
2017	And the Winner Isn't	Herself	Documentary	
2021	Batman: The Long Halloween	Selina Kyle / Catwoman	Voice role Posthumous release, final film role; dedicated in memory	

Television
Year	Title	Role	Notes	Ref.
1991–92	The Royal Family	Hillary Winston	Main role	
1992–93	Family Matters	Gwendolyn	3 episodes	
1993	The Fresh Prince of Bel-Air	Cindy	Episode: "Bundle of Joy"	
1993	The Sinbad Show	Party Guest	Episode: "It's My Party, I'll Cry If I Want To"	
1994	Sirens	Shelly	1 episode	
1995	Live Shot	Ann	Episode: "Another Day, Another Story"	
1996	Baywatch	Willa	Episode: "Scorcher"	
1997–99	Smart Guy	Tanya; Kelly	Episodes: "Baby, It's You and You and You" "Never Too Young"	
1999	The Jersey	Girl #2	Episode: "Be True to You"	
2002	House Blend	Chloe	Pilot episode	
2002	Even Stevens	Charlene	Episode: "Short Story"	
2002	My Wife and Kids	Amber	1 episode	
2002–06	The Bernie Mac Show	Donna	11 episodes	
2003	Soul Food	Lauryn	2 episodes	
2004	8 Simple Rules	Nice Girl	Episode: "Halloween"	
2007	Wild World of Spike	Herself/College Student	Episode: "Amateur Pole Dance-off"	
2008	Girlfriends	Karin	Episode: "Stand and Deliver"	
2008	CSI: Miami	Rachel Calvado	Episode: "Power Trip"	
2009–15	Glee	Santana Lopez	Recurring role (seasons 1 & 6); Main role (seasons 2–5)	
2014	The Real Housewives of Atlanta	Herself	Episode: "Secrets Revealed"	
2015	Devious Maids	Blanca Alvarez	5 episodes	
2016	American Dad!	Lolo Fuentes	Episode: "The Unincludeds"	
2017	RuPaul's Drag Race	Herself	Guest judge; episode: "Good Morning Bitches"	
2018	Kevin Hart: Lyft Legend	Naya/Girlfriend	Episode: "Naya Rivera Meets Mr. Steal Yo' Girl"	
2018–19	Step Up: High Water	Collette Jones	Main role (seasons 1–2); Season 3 in production at the time of her death	
2020	Sugar Rush: Extra Sweet	Herself	Guest judge; episode: "Birds of a Feather"; Posthumous release; episode dedicated to her	
2020	The Eric Andre Show	Herself	Episode: "Blannibal Quits"; Posthumous release; final appearance	

Music videos
Year	Artist	Song title
2002	B2K	"Why I Love You"
2012	2Cellos feat. Naya Rivera	"Supermassive Black Hole"

== Stage ==
Year	Title	Role	Notes
2006–2007	U Don't Know Me	Keila	Los Angeles, and U.S. national tour
2010–2011	Glee Live! In Concert!	Santana Lopez	North America, UK, and Ireland tour

== Discography ==
In 2012, Rivera was featured on a single by the music duo 2Cellos, performing a cover of the Muse song "Supermassive Black Hole". The single, from the album In2ition, spent two weeks on the charts, reaching number 16 on the iTunes Top 100 Classical chart in the week of July 13 to 19, 2020, and dropping to number 81 the week after. The Japanese collector's edition of In2ition also included the Glee cast feat. 2Cellos version of "Smooth Criminal", on which Rivera sang. This version of the album went to number 1 in Japan and won a Japan Gold Disc Award. In her own musical career, she released her debut single "Sorry", featuring then-boyfriend Big Sean, in 2013. The planned album had been stuck in development before being canceled entirely. Rivera's next and last release was a six-track EP titled My Heart in April 2019, containing the tracks "Seven Days", "Prayer for the Broken", "My Heart", "Think You Slick", "Beautiful Boy", and "Radio Silence". She also contributed to the original soundtrack for Step Up: High Water, singing a piano version of "Amazing Grace". In 2023, Rivera's vocals were featured on a single called "You and I" by Jaffa Moore, son of James Bond actor, Roger. At the beginning of February 2023, the single had climbed to number 21 on Rockefella TV's/Talking Pictures TV's Heritage Chart show.

=== Singles ===
Title	Year	Peak positions				Album
Title	Year	US Rhythmic	IRE	UK	iTunes Classical	Album
"Supermassive Black Hole" (2Cellos featuring Naya Rivera)	2012	—	—	—	16	In2ition
"Sorry" (featuring Big Sean)	2013	34	81	73	—	Non-album single (Note: Non-album single)
"Amazing Grace" (Step Up: High Water featuring Naya Rivera)	2019	—	—	—	—	Step Up: High Water, Season 2 (Original Soundtrack)
"You and I" (Jaffa Moore featuring Naya Rivera)	2023	—	—	—	—	Photograph
"Prayer for the Broken" (with Friends from Glee) (Note: Friends from Glee is composed of Ashley Fink, Vanessa Lengies, Heather Morris, Kevin McHale, Jenna Ushkowitz, and Amber Riley)	2023	—	—	—	—	Non-album single (Note: Non-album single)
"—" denotes a recording that did not chart or was not released in that territory.

=== With Glee ===
As a featured singer in the cast of Glee, Rivera and her castmates released many singles and held numerous accolades; in 2011 they were collectively nominated for a Grammy Award for their version of "Don't Stop Believin'", receiving an album Grammy nomination and a Brit Award nomination, and by the start of the sixth season they were the most-charting act in history – a record held until March 2020. Rivera's first Glee single as a lead vocalist was a duet cover of "The Boy Is Mine" performed with Amber Riley (as Mercedes Jones). The last Glee single to chart during the show's run was Rivera's cover of "If I Die Young". Besides her charting singles, several other performances by Rivera have been particularly highlighted, including "Girl on Fire" in season 4; "Don't Rain on My Parade" and "Doo Wop (That Thing)" in season 5; and "Science Fiction Double Feature" and the original song "Trouty Mouth" in season 2. She was a featured singer on the original song "Loser like Me", which is certified Gold; it and five other songs she performed charted in the World top 40. (Note: "Forget You", "Landslide", "Rumour Has It / Someone Like You", "We Are Young", and "Smooth Criminal".)

== Awards and nominations ==
Rivera was first nominated for an award at the age of 5, in 1992, but did not win one until 2010, eighteen years later. After this she was consistently nominated for – and won – awards for acting, singing, and her public image, including various audience awards. For her work on Glee, she won 9 awards from 24 nominations. Her last award, given in 2018, 26 years after her first nomination, was for the cast and production of Step Up: High Water providing equal female representation.

Year	Association	Category	Work	Result	Refs.
1992	Young Artist Awards	Exceptional Performance by a Young Actress Under Ten	The Royal Family	Nominated	
2010	AfterEllen Visibility Awards	Favorite TV Actress	Glee	Nominated	
2010	American Music Awards	Favorite Soundtrack Album	Glee: The Music, Volume 3 Showstoppers	Won	
2010	Gay People's Choice Awards	Favorite Music Duo or Group	Glee cast	Won	
2010	Gay People's Choice Awards	Best Ensemble TV Cast	Glee	Won	
2010	Imagen Awards	Best Supporting Actress – Television	Glee	Nominated	
2010	Lesbian/Bi People's Choice Awards	Favorite Music Duo or Group	Glee cast	Nominated	
2010	Nickelodeon Australian Kids' Choice Awards	Fave International Band	Glee cast	Nominated	
2010	Screen Actors Guild Awards	Outstanding Performance by an Ensemble in a Comedy Series	Glee	Won	
2010	Teen Choice Awards	Choice Music: Group	Glee cast	Nominated	
2010	TV Land Awards	Future Classics	Glee	Won	
2011	ALMA Awards	Favorite Female Music Artist	Herself	Won	
2011	ALMA Awards	Favorite TV Actress – Leading Role in a Comedy	Glee	Nominated	
2011	Brit Awards	International Breakthrough Act	Glee cast	Nominated	
2011	Grammy Awards	Best Pop Performance by a Duo or Group with Vocals	"Don't Stop Believin'" (Glee cast version) (Note: Shared with Cory Monteith, Lea Michele, Chris Colfer, Kevin McHale, Jenna Ushkowitz, Mark Salling and Amber Riley)	Nominated	
2011	Screen Actors Guild Awards	Outstanding Performance by an Ensemble in a Comedy Series	Glee	Nominated	
2011	Teen Choice Awards	Choice Music: Group	Glee cast	Nominated	
2012	ALMA Awards	Best Female Music Artist	Herself	Won	
2012	ALMA Awards	Favorite TV Actress – Comedy	Glee	Won	
2012	Grammy Awards	Best Compilation Soundtrack for Visual Media	Glee: The Music, Volume 4 (Glee cast)	Nominated	
2012	NewNowNext Awards	Cause You're Hot	Herself	Won	
2012	Screen Actors Guild Awards	Outstanding Performance by an Ensemble in a Comedy Series	Glee	Nominated	
2013	Giffoni Film Festival	Giffoni Experience Award	Herself	Won	
2013	Screen Actors Guild Awards	Outstanding Performance by an Ensemble in a Comedy Series	Glee	Nominated	
2014	People's Choice Awards	Favorite TV Gal Pals	Glee (with Lea Michele)	Won	
2014	Teen Choice Awards	Choice TV: Female Scene Stealer	Glee	Nominated	
2018	The ReFrame Stamp	Television season (featuring women in key roles)	Step Up: High Water (season 1)	Won	

== See also ==
- List of Afro-Latinos
- List of solved missing person cases (2020s)
- List of television performers who died during production
