= Body Cam (film) =

2020 film by Malik Vitthal

- Promotional poster
- Directed by: Malik Vitthal
- Screenplay by: Nicholas McCarthy; Richmond Riedel
- Story by: Richmond Riedel
- Produced by: Matt Kaplan
- Starring: Mary J. Blige; Nat Wolff; David Zayas; David Warshofsky; Demetrius Grosse; Anika Noni Rose
- Cinematography: Pedro Luque
- Edited by: Ken Blackwell
- Music by: Joseph Bishara
- Production companies: Ace Entertainment; Paramount Players; BET Films
- Distributed by: Paramount Pictures
- Release date: May 19, 2020
- Running time: 96 minutes
- Country: United States
- Language: English
- Budget: $9.6 million

Body Cam is a 2020 American police procedural horror film directed by Malik Vitthal, from a screenplay by Nicholas McCarthy and Richmond Riedel and a story by Riedel. The film stars Mary J. Blige, Nat Wolff, David Zayas, David Warshofsky, Demetrius Grosse and Anika Noni Rose.

Originally scheduled to be released in 2019, Body Cam was pulled from Paramount's release schedule and was released digitally on May 19, 2020, prior to a video on demand release on June 2, 2020, by Paramount Pictures.

== Plot ==
In Swinton, Louisiana, police officer Kevin Ganning pulls over a green van for not having a license plate, but when he points his gun at the driver, an unknown entity pulls him away. Officers Renee Lomito-Smith and rookie Danny Holledge are called to investigate Ganning's last known location, where they find the dash-cam footage showing Ganning's beating from an unknown entity and Ganning's lifeless body. Sergeant Kesper tells them the footage was destroyed before they had arrived.

When Lomito-Smith recognizes a hospital logo on the driver's pants, she tracks down the driver: Taneesha Branz. She and Holledge discover Taneesha's home abandoned, but they find a photo of Taneesha and her son. Holledge leaves quickly because of roaches, but when Lomito-Smith tries to exit, she finds it locked and realizes the entity is watching. She escapes by breaking the door window. Lomito-Smith later learns Taneesha's son Demarco was killed in a gang shoot out.

Taneesha shops in a grocery store and is harassed by two men vandalizing the store. Officers Roberts and Birke spot her green van, calling for backup; Lomito-Smith and Holledge answer the call. Birke and Roberts question the two men. One of the men kills Birke and takes Taneesha hostage. As he threatens to kill her, the entity lifts him into the air, freeing Taneesha, who gets away. Attempting to escape the entity, the robber fires his gun, accidentally killing the store clerk and his partner. When Roberts looks for the shooter, his bloodied body falls from the ceiling, his teeth taken out. The entity then suffocates Roberts with a bag before lifting him into the air and killing him off-screen.

Lomito-Smith and Holledge arrive and find everyone dead. Lomito-Smith discovers the security camera footage is unusable, so she steals one of the men's phones to find clues. At the medical examiner's, she unlocks the phone with the man's thumbprint. She later reviews the phone's video, noticing the entity behind Taneesha and the robber.

A lead on the green van leads her to a church, where the Pastor explains Taneesha's son, Demarco, was deaf and avidly volunteered for many organizations. She finds articles about Demarco's death alongside photos of Officers Ganning, Roberts, Holledge, and Penda. Unable to get ahold of Sergeant Kesper, Lomito-Smith calls Holledge, who agrees to meet her in one hour. When she arrives, she discovers he has committed suicide, leaving her an apology note and a flash drive, which reveals Holledge's body cam footage of himself, Ganning, Roberts, and Penda yelling at a young man to stop walking under the assumption he is a suspect. Penda shoots him when he doesn't stop. Roberts hands the phone to Penda, who realizes the young man was Demarco. Holledge points out his teeth came out, but Penda tells Holledge how bad this situation is and suffocates Demarco.

Lomito-Smith meets Kesper at a warehouse and tells him what the four officers did to Demarco. Kesper pulls his gun on her and tells her the incident is best left covered up. Penda arrives and demands she hand over the footage. When she refuses, he shoots into her Kevlar vest. Taneesha appears and tells Penda, "YOU KILLED MY SON, DEMARCO. YOU REMEMBER HIM? BECAUSE HE REMEMBERS YOU." The entity is revealed as Demarco's vengeful spirit, who beats up Kesper and knocks out his teeth. Lomito-Smith and Taneesha escape to another part of the warehouse with Penda in pursuit. Demarco's spirit removes Penda's innards from his body and impales him onto a large pipe.

As Lomito-Smith prepares to confront Demarco, Taneesha reveals he will not harm her. Emergency services arrive. Lomito-Smith and Taneesha see their sons together, signifying they have now found peace and can move on. Kesper, who survived Demarco's attack, is sent to prison.

== Cast ==
- Mary J. Blige as Renee Lomito-Smith
- Nat Wolff as Danny Holledge
- David Zayas as Sergeant Kesper
- David Warshofsky as Dario Penda
- Demetrius Grosse as Gary Smith
- Anika Noni Rose as Taneesha Branz
- Lance E. Nichols as Pastor Thomas Jackson
- Lara Grice as Detective Susan Hayes
- Ian Casselberry as Kevin Ganning
- Philip Fornah as Gabe Roberts
- Naima Ramos-Chapman as Maria Birke
- Mason Mackie as DeMarco Branz
- Jibrail Nantambu as Christopher
- Sylvia Grace Crim as Pierce
- Jeff Pope as Jacob
- Lorrie Odom as Yolanda

== Production ==
In March 2017, it was announced Richmond Riedel had written the script for the film. In March 2018, it was announced Malik Vitthal would direct the film, with Nicholas McCarthy re-writing the script, and Paramount Pictures distributing. John Ridley had performed script revisions prior to McCarthy's involvement.

In June 2018, Mary J. Blige joined the cast of the film. In July 2018, Nat Wolff joined the cast. In September 2018, Anika Noni Rose and David Zayas were cast, with filming beginning in New Orleans.

Joseph Bishara composed the film score. Paramount Music has released the soundtrack.

== Release ==
Body Cam was supposed to be theatrically released on May 17, 2019, but was later pushed back to December 6, 2019. On November 12, 2019, Paramount Pictures pulled the film from its release schedule. Due to the COVID-19 pandemic, it was released digitally on May 19, 2020, prior to a video on demand release on June 2, 2020.

It was the eighth-most rented film on Spectrum in its first weekend of release.

=== Critical response ===
On Rotten Tomatoes, the film has an approval rating of 44% based on 27 reviews, with an average rating of 5/10. The site's critics consensus reads: "Ambitious yet undercooked, Body Cam can't quite connect the dots between its genre thrills and socially aware themes." On Metacritic, the film has an weighted average score of 37 out of 100, based on reviews from 5 critics, indicating "generally unfavorable" reviews.
