= The Pact 2 =

- Film poster
- Directed by: Dallas Richard Hallam; Patrick Horvath
- Written by: Dallas Richard Hallam; Patrick Horvath
- Produced by: Ross M. Dinerstein
- Starring: Camilla Luddington; Scott Michael Foster; Mark Steger; Amy Pietz; Nicki Micheaux; Patrick Fischler; Caity Lotz
- Cinematography: Carmen Cabana
- Edited by: Saul Herckis
- Music by: Carl Sondrol
- Production companies: Campfire; Preferred Film & TV
- Distributed by: IFC Midnight
- Release date: September 5, 2014
- Running time: 96 minutes
- Country: United States
- Language: English

The Pact 2 (also stylized as The Pact II) is a 2014 American horror film that was directed by Dallas Richard Hallam and Patrick Horvath. It was released as a VOD release on September 5, 2014 and was given a limited theatrical release on October 10, 2014. The movie is a sequel to Nicolas McCarthy's 2012 film The Pact and has Caity Lotz returning to reprise the character Annie Barlow, who must once again deal with a bloodthirsty murderer.

== Plot ==
June Abbott (Camilla Luddington), a crime scene cleaner, finds an order to clean the residence of Ellie Ford, a woman murdered by a serial killer that mimics the modus operandi of the "Judas Killer". She receives a ring from her boyfriend, Officer Daniel Meyer (Scott Michael Foster). June, who has a troubled relationship with her alcoholic and smoker mother, Maggie (Amy Pietz), whom Daniel blames for burdening June, is questioned by the demanding FBI agent Terrence Ballard (Patrick Fischler) about Ellie Ford. Ballard reveals that June is adopted by Maggie; her birth mother was Jennifer Glick, Maggie's sister and the first victim of the Judas Killer. Ballard gives June the personal effects from Jennifer Glick before he leaves, which includes a Bible. The Bible has photos of Jennifer Glick, the "Judas Killer" (Charles Barlow), and Charles' sister. June has a heated argument with Maggie, who refuses to disclose anything. After cleaning Ford's apartment, June is haunted by a silhouette of Judas and has a vision where Maggie is killed by a woman. She races to Maggie's house to find her dead body.

Ballard becomes suspicious of June, especially when he learns that she had an argument with Maggie before. June sneaks to Maggie's house and finds a Bible page, almost getting caught by Ballard in the process. The page highlights a quotation about Judas Iscariot and was torn from Jennifer Glick's Bible. After reading articles about Charles' niece and killer, Annie Barlow, whom Daniel had researched, June contacts Annie (Caity Lotz). The two try to ask the assistance of Annie's psychic friend, Stevie (Haley Hudson), but the latter states that she cannot help and that she and her brother, Giles, will move out of town. Though the two decide to end the search, Annie agrees to cooperate further when she realizes that June's father might have been her uncle, Charles. Going back to June's house, the two are greeted by Daniel.

June and Annie conduct a séance in the attic and call out Ellie's and Maggie's spirits, who whisper about the "Pink Room" to Annie. Seeing June injured after the contact, Annie decides to go to Ellie's apartment by herself. She manages to take several photos, but is mortally wounded by someone. Before she dies, Annie manages to send the photos to June. From the photos, June heads to the "Pink Room", an erotic photo studio. She learns that Ellie was a model there, though the photographer is unknown. Going back home, June is confronted by Ballard, but is later contacted by Daniel who tells her that Ballard is the killer. She manages to tie him up until Daniel arrives, despite his protests. Opening up Daniel's closet, June finds Ellie's ring and photos, realizing that he is her photographer and thus her killer.

Daniel admits that he is the copycat killer and that Charles speaks to him, telling him that June should continue the Judas legacy. June and Daniel have a cat-and-mouse chase across the house. While searching for June, Daniel admits that he gave her Ellie's ring to propose, but was too nervous. Daniel tries to kill June by shooting through a closed door, but she bludgeons him with a bat instead. She heads downstairs to deal the final blow to Daniel before he is able to shoot Ballard, finally killing him. Ballard is taken to the hospital while June is freed from suspicion. She receives a call from Stevie, the latter panicky telling her that Annie left her a message: "it is starting again". The camera pans to the mirror in front of June, showing Charles standing behind her.

== Cast ==
- Caity Lotz as Annie Barlow
- Camilla Luddington as June Abbott
- Scott Michael Foster as Officer Daniel Meyer
- Amy Pietz as Margaret "Maggie" Abbott
- Patrick Fischler as FBI Agent Terrence Ballard
- Haley Hudson as Stevie
- Mark Steger as Charles Barlow / "Judas"
- Nicki Micheaux as Lt. Eileen Carver
- Alexandra Ryan as CPS Interviewer (voice)
- Brad Grunberg as Building Manager
- Trent Haaga as Pink Room Receptionist
- Leonel Claude as Forensic Team
- Suziey Block as Ellie Ford
- Joshua Grote as Snyder

== Reception ==
Critical reception for The Pact 2 has been negative, and the film holds a rating of 23% on Rotten Tomatoes, based on 13 reviews. Much of the film's criticism stemmed from it not improving on the 2012 film, and Andy Webster of The New York Times also criticized the film's Judas Killer for not having a memorable "gimmick" along the lines of Freddy Krueger's blade-fingers or Leatherface's leathery face. The Village Voice panned the film, writing "The Pact, the original, makes this guy (embodied by Mark Steger) seem monstrous, a thoughtless grub-man nightmare hatched in some grim nook of your home you never bothered to clean up. The Pact 2 never lets you forget he's an actor on a set, maybe drinking some tea between shots. He's probably really nice". Variety was somewhat more positive in their review, commenting that the "Performances are okay, though this is one of those movies in which somebody thought it was a good idea to have most of the characters forever rattling each others" nerves - a tactic that only makes their interactions more annoying, not more suspenseful. Indeed, tension is pretty tepid throughout, despite decent-enough assembly that includes some nice work from composer Carl Sondrol and d.p. Carmen Cabana."
