= Caity Lotz =

American actress

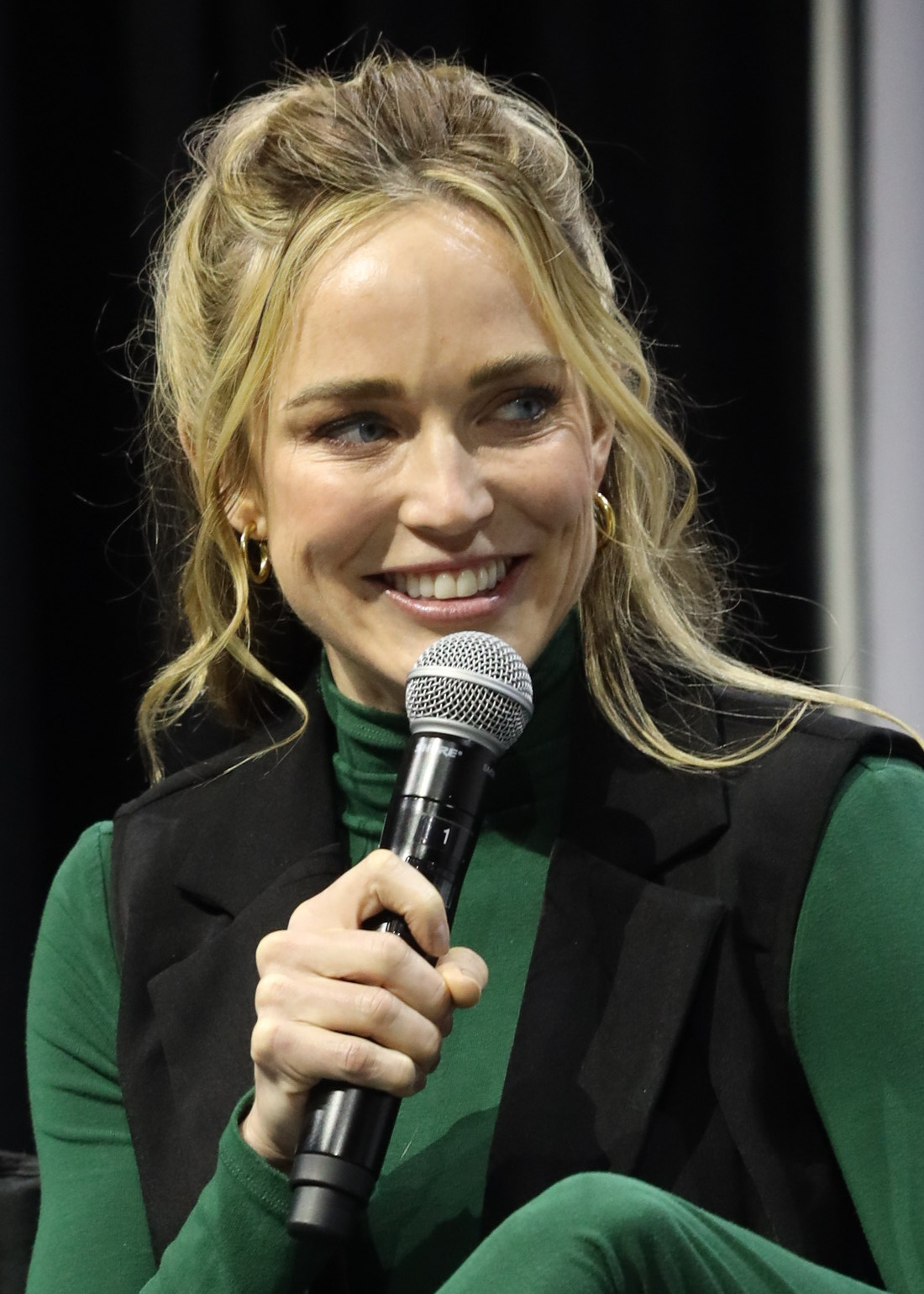
- Lotz in 2022
- Born: December 30, 1986 (age 39)
- Occupations: Actress; dancer; singer; director
- Years active: 2003–present
- Spouse: Kyle Schmid (m. 2023)
- Children: 2

Caity Lotz (born December 30, 1986) is an American actress, dancer, and singer. She has portrayed Stephanie Horton in the AMC series Mad Men, Officer Kirsten Landry in the MTV mockumentary series Death Valley (2011), Annie Barlow in The Pact (2012) and The Pact 2 (2014), and Sara Lance/The Canary/White Canary in The CW's Arrowverse television franchise (2013–2022).

== Career ==
=== Dancing and singing ===
Lotz started her career as a dancer, touring with Avril Lavigne and Lady Gaga, and starring in music videos including Lady Gaga's "Paparazzi", David Guetta and Estelle's "One Love", Selena Gomez's "Tell Me Something I Don't Know", T-Pain's "Freeze", JoJo's "Baby It's You", Cascada's "Evacuate the Dancefloor", Kaci Brown's "Instigator", and Wang Leehom's "Gai Shi Ying Xiong". Lotz appeared on Dancing With the Stars season 8, as Lady Gaga's backup dancer for the song "LoveGame". Her Avril Lavigne tour performance was released on the video The Best Damn Tour: Live in Toronto.

Lotz appeared in TV ads for Jack in the Box, Reebok, and T-Mobile, danced in the web series The Legion of Extraordinary Dancers, toured with the hip hop theatre production Groovaloo, and stunt-doubled in films including Step Up 3D.

In 2005, Lotz joined the girl group Soccx. In 2006, the group released their debut single "From Dusk Till Dawn (Get the Party Started)", which they followed up in 2007 with the single "Scream Out Loud", both of which reached the top 10 in Germany. Their début album, Hold On, was also released in 2007, and their third single, "Can't Take My Eyes Off You", was released in 2008.

=== Modeling ===
Lotz has modelled for Men's Health and Esquire, the latter in conjunction with the website Me in My Place.

=== Acting ===
Lotz did her acting training at Sanford Meisner for two years. Lotz began her acting career in 2006 with a small role in the cheerleading film Bring It On: All or Nothing. She followed that up in 2010 with a part in the third episode of Law & Order: LA and a recurring role in the fourth season of the AMC drama Mad Men as Stephanie, Anna Draper's niece. In 2011, Lotz starred as Officer Kirsten Landry, one of the main characters in the MTV horror, black comedy mockumentary series Death Valley. Lotz performed all her own stunts on the show.

In 2012, Lotz had roles in Live at the Foxes Den, Battle of the Year alongside Josh Holloway and alongside Casper Van Dien and Agnes Bruckner in the supernatural thriller The Pact, which débuted at the 2012 Sundance Film Festival and has been picked up for distribution.

Starting with the second season of The CW's superhero TV series Arrow, Lotz appeared as Sara Lance, a character believed dead who returns as a costumed vigilante known as The Canary. Lotz reprised her role as Lance in the spin-off series Legends of Tomorrow. As part of the greater Arrowverse, Lotz also appeared as Sara Lance on The Flash, Supergirl, and Batwoman. She would go on to make her directorial debut in Legends of Tomorrow's fifth-season episode "Mortal Khanbat".

She played the lead role in the science fiction film The Machine, which had its UK release on March 21, 2014, and had its US release on April 25, 2014. In May 2014, she reprised her role as Stephanie in the seventh season of Mad Men. She also played Dr. Emily McTier in the film 400 Days, along with her Legends of Tomorrow co-star Brandon Routh, in 2016.

In 2024, Lotz portrayed Kaitlin Armstrong in the Lifetime film Yoga Teacher Killer: The Kaitlin Armstrong Story which was based on the Murder of Moriah Wilson.

=== Martial arts ===
Lotz is a martial artist, training in Taekwondo, Wushu, Krav Maga, Arnis and Muay Thai. She is also a practitioner of parkour and tricking.

== Personal life ==
Lotz announced at Starfury Events: Ultimates Crisis, a fan convention in the U.K., that she and Kyle Schmid were engaged in May 2022. The two married in 2023 in Colombia. In April 2024, Lotz announced that she was pregnant with the couple's first child. In September 2024, they announced the birth of their daughter. On August 18, 2025, Lotz announced on her Instagram that she and her husband Kyle Schmid are expecting another child together. On February 20, 2026, she gave birth to their son.

== Filmography ==
=== Film ===
Year	Title	Role	Notes
2006	Bring It On: All or Nothing	Pacific Vista Cheerleader	
2012	The Pact	Annie Barlow	
2012	Cold & Ugly	Tanya Pavelovna	Short film
2013	The Machine	Ava/The Machine	
2013	Battle of the Year	Stacy	
2013	Out of the Blue	Dominique	Short film
2013	Live at the Foxes Den	Susan Hudson	
2014	The Pact 2	Annie Barlow	
2015	Missed Call	Kirsten	Short film
2015	400 Days	Dr. Emily McTier	
2017	Small Town Crime	Heidi	
2018	Year One	Tess	completed short film
2020	Twin Turbo		Short film, director, writer and producer
2024	The Lockdown	Charlie Hightower	

=== Television ===
Year	Title	Role	Notes
2004–2005	Dance 360	Herself	Contestant
2010	Law & Order: LA	Amy Reynolds	Episode: "Harbor City"
2010–2015	Mad Men	Stephanie Horton	Recurring role, 5 episodes
2011	Death Valley	Officer Kirsten Landry	Main role
2012	NTSF:SD:SUV::	Mary	Episode: "Lights, Camera, Assassination"
2013–2020	Arrow	Sara Lance/The Canary/White Canary	Recurring role (seasons 2–4); special guest star (seasons 5–8); 38 episodes
2014	Stalker	Melissa Barnes	Episode: "Love Is a Battlefield"
2016	Robot Chicken	Voice role	Episode: "Fridge Smell"
2016–2022	Legends of Tomorrow	Sara Lance/White Canary	109 episodes Director (3 episodes); Nominated - Teen Choice Award for Choice Action TV Actress (2017)
2016–2017, 2019, 2022	The Flash	Sara Lance/White Canary	Special guest star, 3 episodes Director: "The Curious Case of Bartholomew Allen"
2017, 2019	Supergirl	Sara Lance/White Canary	Special guest star, 2 episodes
2019	Batwoman	Sara Lance/White Canary	Episode: "Crisis on Infinite Earths, Part 2"
2024	Yoga Teacher Killer: The Kaitlin Armstrong Story	Kaitlin Armstrong	Lifetime TV movie

=== Web ===
Year	Title	Role	Notes
2013	Burning Love	Hathwell's date	Episode: "Burn Baby Burn"

== Accolades ==
Year	Award	Category	Nominated work	Result	Ref.
2013	British Independent Film Awards	Most Promising Newcomer	The Machine	Nominated	
2013	Toronto After Dark Film Festival	Best Actress	The Machine	Won	
2017	Teen Choice Awards	Teen Choice Award for Choice TV Actress Action	Legends of Tomorrow	Nominated	
2018	Teen Choice Awards	Teen Choice Award for Choice TV Actress Action	Legends of Tomorrow	Nominated	
