= Haley Hudson =

American actress and musician

- Occupations: Actress, musician
- Years active: 2002–2014; 2025

Haley Hudson is an American actress and musician, best known for her role as Peg in Freaky Friday (2003) and its sequel Freakier Friday (2025). She is currently the lead singer of the band Hudson Rubin.

== Career ==
She began her career at age 16 in Disney's remake of Freaky Friday opposite Jamie Lee Curtis and Lindsay Lohan. Hudson played the role of Peg, a member of the rock band Pink Slip and best friend of the main character, played by Lohan. During her teens and 20s, she portrayed many different characters in films and TV shows, including the roles of Debby in Marley & Me, Quinn Hodes in Weeds, Sydney Fields in Terminator: The Sarah Connor Chronicles, and Amanda in both Look and Look: The Series for director Adam Rifkin. In 2012, Hudson starred in the IFC horror film The Pact, which premiered at the Sundance Film Festival to mostly positive reviews. Critics singled her out for her sensitive, visceral portrayal of the blind psychic, Stevie.

In 2025, she reprised the role of Peg in Disney’s Freaky Friday sequel, Freakier Friday. The same year, she formed a real band, Hudson Rubin, with another member of “Pink Slip”, the fictional band in the Freaky Friday films.

== Filmography ==
Year	Title	Role	Notes
2003	Freaky Friday	Peg	
2005	Sweet Pea	Laura	Short film
2007	Look	Amanda	
2008	Killer Pad	Morgan	
2008	Marley & Me	Debby	
2009	The Inner Circle	Rose Brown	
2010	Killer by Nature	Maggie	
2012	Making Change	Dolla	
2012	The Pact	Stevie	
2012	Nora	Nora	Short film
2014	The Pact 2	Stevie	
2025	Freakier Friday	Peg	

== Television ==
Year	Title	Role	Notes
2003	Lizzie McGuire	Clementine	Episode: "Grubby Longjohn's Olde Tyme Revue"
2005–2009	Weeds	Quinn Hodes	Recurring role (seasons 1, 4–5), 3 episodes
2006	Sons & Daughters	Estee	Episode: "House Party"
2008	Terminator: The Sarah Connor Chronicles	Sydney Fields	Episode: "Alpine Fields"
2009	The Forgotten	Punk Girl	Episode: "Pilot"
2009	Ruby & the Rockits	Molly	Episode: "Smells Like Teen Drama"
2009	Ghost Whisperer	Scarlett	Episode: "See No Evil"
2010	Look: The Series	Amanda	Recurring role (6 episodes)
2014	The Mentalist	Christie De Jorio	Episode: "Blue Bird"
2014	Queen Gorya	Jane Riley	Episode: "Pilot"

== Discography ==
- 2003 - Freaky Friday Soundtrack
