= Sorry (Naya Rivera song) =

Single by Naya Rivera featuring Big Sean
- Released: September 17, 2013
- Recorded: 2013
- Genre: Pop; R&B
- Length: 3:36
- Label: Columbia
- Songwriter(s): Jaden Michaels; John Lock; Roahn Hylton; Naya Rivera; Big Sean
- Producer(s): John Lock

Big Sean singles chronology
"Fire" (2013)	"Sorry" (2013)	"All Me" (2013)

Music video
- "Sorry" on YouTube

"Sorry" is the debut single by American singer and actress Naya Rivera featuring American rapper Big Sean. It was released on September 17, 2013. It is the only single to be released during Rivera's lifetime.

== Background ==
In an interview with Billboard, Rivera spoke about the song saying "I wrote the song at the beginning of the summer along with some other songs... and this song just felt like a really good end-of-summer song, I wanted to get a feature on it, and it just felt like Sean's swag and his vibe would just really fit this well, and I was right."

== Music video ==
A lyrical video of "Sorry" was released on September 17. Rivera enlisted a bevy of women to strip down for her NSFW black-and-white in the video which also features light projections.

Rivera talked about the lyrical video and its comparisons to Robin Thicke's "Blurred Lines" video:

I guess it is sort of the trend. Listen, I love that "Blurred Lines" video. I love his "Give It to You" video. I think that Robin [Thicke] is doing really amazing things with his music videos right now, but you have to keep in mind that this is just the lyric video so it's actually the video before the video. I thought that it was really cool that people are putting out lyric videos and when I started to think about what I wanted to do for this one, I researched a bunch of recent lyrical videos and I wanted it to be a production. I wanted to come out in a big way. So I had this idea that, since there's so much hype and talk about the song being all about these girls and how I'm allegedly calling out all these exes, I thought "Why don’t we get these girls and project the lyrics onto their bodies?" That’s sort of where it started and we turned them into human canvases. I really like the way it came out. I definitely wanted to do something different and really showcase what I like artistically right now.

== Chart positions ==
The song made its debut in the Billboard U.S. Rhythmic chart charting at number 37. The song appeared in the UK Singles Chart and Irish Singles Chart charting at numbers 73 and 81, respectively. The song also charted at number 30 on Billboard's Pop Digital Tracks.

Chart (2013)	Peak position
Ireland (IRMA)	81
UK Singles (OCC)	73
US Rhythmic (Billboard)	34
