= The Pact (2012 film) =

- Directed by: Nicholas McCarthy
- Written by: Nicholas McCarthy
- Produced by: Ross M. Dinerstein
- Starring: Caity Lotz; Casper Van Dien; Agnes Bruckner; Haley Hudson; Kathleen Rose Perkins; Samuel Ball; Mark Steger
- Cinematography: Bridger Nielson
- Edited by: Adriaan van Zyl
- Music by: Ronen Landa
- Production company: Preferred Content
- Distributed by: IFC Midnight
- Release dates: January 20, 2012 (Sundance); May 25, 2012 (United States)
- Running time: 89 minutes
- Country: United States
- Language: English
- Budget: $400,000
- Box office: $7.2 million

The Pact is a 2012 American supernatural horror film written and directed by Nicholas McCarthy and starring Caity Lotz and Casper Van Dien. The film was made following the success of McCarthy's short film of the same name which showed at the 2011 Sundance Film Festival. The film follows Annie, whose mother has recently died, as she tries to discover what caused her sister Nicole and her cousin Liz to disappear.

== Plot ==
Nicole Barlow is finalizing preparations for her mother's funeral at her childhood home in San Pedro, California. Her sister, Annie does not want to attend, reminding Nicole of the way their mother used to treat them. Nicole tries to contact her cousin, Liz, and her daughter Eva via video call. After losing the connection, Nicole sees an open door, leading into a dark room and walks inside.

Annie arrives, having been informed that Nicole is missing, and finds Nicole's phone along with a photo. That night, she awakens from a bad dream and finds a photo of two pregnant women—her mother and a woman in a floral dress. The next day, Annie attends her mother's funeral, and it is shown that Annie has one blue eye and one green eye, but her mother did not.

After the funeral, Annie meets Liz and Eva, and the three return to Annie's mother's house. Later, Annie dreams of a shirtless man crying, and, while she sleeps, her phone shows a map, pinpointing an address. When Annie awakens and sees a figure in the hall, she enters Liz's room and finds her bed empty. An unseen force tries to attack Annie, but she is able to escape the house with Eva.

The police don't believe Annie's story, with one officer, Bill Creek, implying her guilt in the disappearances. In a motel, Annie notices the address on her phone, finding a blurred picture of a figure in a floral dress. That night, she dreams of the crying man again, as well as a decapitated woman in a floral dress; still in the dream, Annie tries to flee from the room, but the door slams shut.

In the morning she wakes up, extremely agitated. Annie, accompanied by Bill Creek, returns to her mother's house where they discover a hidden room, one which Annie has absolutely no recollection of. When nobody else will take her seriously, she recruits her psychic friend, Stevie. Stevie, Annie, and Stevie's protective brother Giles go to the house. In the hidden room, Stevie has a hysterical fit, repeating the name "Judas". They then see the corpse of a woman in a floral dress floating above them, and Annie realizes that it is not her mother haunting the house.

Outside, Giles blasts Annie for putting his sister in harm's way. They have a brief altercation, and Giles angrily drives away with Stevie, leaving Annie all by herself. Researching Judas online, Annie finds a serial killer, dubbed the "Judas Killer,” who decapitated a woman in a floral dress, Jennifer Glick. Annie also discovers that her mother has a brother, and that both had connections with Glick.

Creek investigates the house after finding a mysterious photo pointing to a cupboard, where there is a secret door leading into the hidden room. Creek is then murdered by an unknown assailant. Desperate for answers, Annie uses a makeshift Ouija board to contact Glick, who confirms her suspicions that Glick was murdered by her uncle, the "Judas Killer".

Annie sees Judas come up from a secret hatch, and hides, discovering the bodies of Creek and Nicole. While Judas cries, Annie takes Creek's gun but is overpowered by Judas and knocked unconscious. She awakens to find herself tied up and imprisoned in the closet, but manages to escape, stabbing Judas with a coat hanger.

Before Judas can kill her, Glick's spirit pulls her away, to Creek's gun. Annie shoots Judas, killing him, noting that he has heterochromia as well. In the aftermath, Annie is awarded custody of Eva. With Liz and Nicole dead, the house has been sold and is under renovations. In the final scene, Annie sleeps and we see in her dream that Judas' eye opens, and he looks around.

== Cast ==
- Caity Lotz as Annie Barlow
- Casper Van Dien as Bill Creek
- Agnes Bruckner as Nicole Barlow
- Haley Hudson as Stevie
- Kathleen Rose Perkins as Liz
- Samuel Ball as Giles
- Bo Barrett as Jesse
- Dakota Bright as Eva
- Jeffrey T Ferguson as Officer Benson
- Rachael Kahne as waitress
- Santiago Segura as dishwasher
- Sam Zuckerman as County Clerk
- Mark Steger as Charles Barlow ("Judas")

== Release ==
The Pact premiered at the 2012 Sundance Film Festival on January 20, opening to generally favorable reviews. The film was released in the United States on May 25, 2012 through video on demand by IFC Midnight and June 8, 2012 in the United Kingdom and Ireland.

== Critical reception ==
Rotten Tomatoes, a review aggregator, reports that 66% of 41 surveyed critics gave the film a positive review; the average rating was 5.8/10. Metacritic rated it 54/100 based on ten reviews. Alan Bacchus of DailyFilm said that the film was "smart, well written and genuinely scary" and gave the film three out of four stars, a rating of "good".

== Sequel ==
A sequel titled The Pact 2 was released on VOD in September 2014 and was given a limited-theatrical release the following month. The film had Lotz, Steger, and Hudson return to perform their same roles, and Camilla Luddington was brought on to perform in the leading role of June Abbott. McCarthy did not return to direct the film, which was instead written and directed by Dallas Hallam and Patrick Horvath.
