= Nicholas McCarthy (director) =

American film director

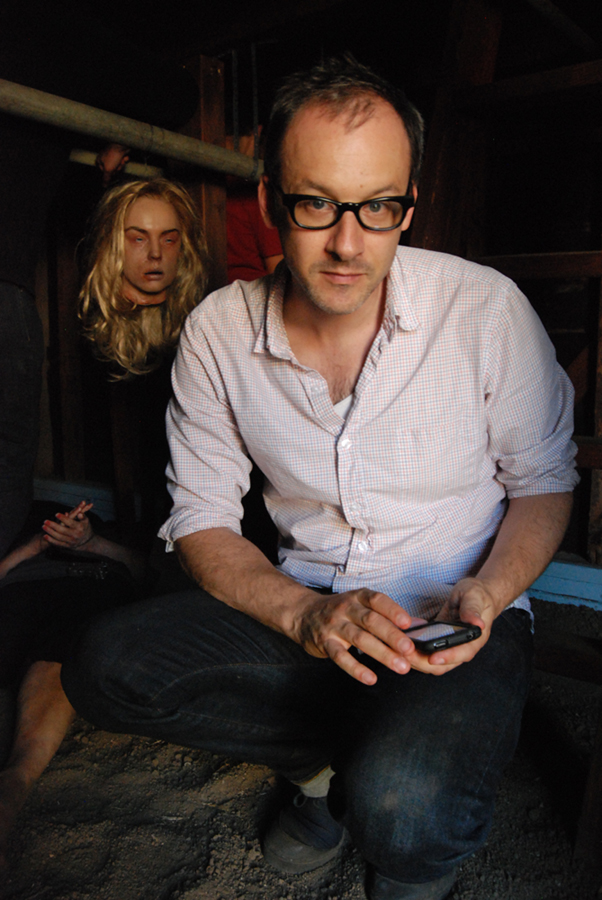
- McCarthy on the set of The Pact in 2012
- Born: New Hampshire, U.S.
- Education: Brookline High School; SUNY Purchase
- Occupations: Film director, screenwriter, producer, actor
- Years active: 2000–present
- Notable work: The Pact; At the Devil's Door

Nicholas McCarthy is an American film director and writer based in Los Angeles. A lifelong lover of film, McCarthy received his first break into the motion picture industry at the age of 40 with the release of his 2012 feature film The Pact. In 2014 he released At the Devil's Door, establishing himself primarily as a maker of horror film.

== Early life ==
McCarthy was born in New Hampshire to an Irish-American Catholic family. His family relocated to the Boston area when McCarthy's father took a position as headmaster at Brookline High School. His mother also worked in education as a schoolteacher.

McCarthy began shooting films at the age of 10 with a Super 8 camera. One of McCarthy's first movie theater outings was seeing the movie Jaws with his older sister, and he later frequented Boston's many repertory cinemas, such as the Coolidge Corner Theater, which screened 35mm prints of older American and foreign films. Local television station WLVI also provided McCarthy with free access to B-movies through its weekly science fiction and horror movie program Creature Double Feature

McCarthy became fascinated with cinematography and by junior high was drawn to the films of David Cronenberg, George A. Romero, John Waters and David Lynch. When he entered Brookline High, McCarthy struck up a friendship with future author and humorist John Hodgman. The two shared a love of weird films and co-edited the controversial magazine Samizdat. Named after dissident underground literature in the Soviet Union, the friends published the magazine for free. The handmade high school publication's open editorial policy sparked a free speech debate among the school's students and faculty and brought citywide attention to its young publishers. During his teens McCarthy also made short movies using a video camera and dabbled in animation through classes in high school and a local arts center.

== Filmmaking career ==
After high school McCarthy lived in Chicago and took filmmaking classes at Columbia College before relocating to New York to attend SUNY Purchase full-time. After graduating with a degree in film, he moved to Brooklyn and worked as a bartender. In his spare time, McCarthy worked in his apartment using a rented editing machine to finish a film that he'd started at SUNY. McCarthy only showed the film once, to a group of his own friends in a rented movie theater.

In 2000 McCarthy moved to Los Angeles where he slept on a couch in his sister's home before renting a Sunset Boulevard apartment for $500 a month. He soon formed the Alpha 60 Film Collective with fellow cinephiles Neil Matsumoto and Cecil Castellucci. Named for the fictional computer villain in Jean-Luc Godard's film Alphaville, the group collaborated on making numerous short films, which they showed at the Echo Park Film Center. McCarthy's 12th film for Alpha 60, entitled Maid, was envisioned as a Spanish language documentary that evolves into a Korean musical in under six minutes. Upon seeing the short, a scout from the Sundance Film Festival recommended McCarthy submit any subsequent work to Sundance. This vote of confidence prompted McCarthy to make "Cry for Help," a short film about a zombie version of Jesus Christ, which premiered at Sundance in 2005. His next short film, Chinese Box starring Sam Ball and Petra Wright, was shot for just $300 and played at Sundance in 2009. Each film toured the festival circuit and netted interest from producers, but no offers for further production.

His third short to play at Sundance, an 11-minute ghost story called The Pact, debuted in 2011. When the short was optioned for a longer production, within six weeks McCarthy expanded it into a feature and was contracted to direct the new feature-length version of the film. The 89-minute feature of The Pact premiered at Sundance in 2012 and was picked up for distribution by IFC. A wide release in the United Kingdom grossed $4 million, and the film was well received stateside with the Los Angeles Times later calling it "a crisply made haunted house movie that benefited from its grab-bag approach." McCarthy immediately got to work on his next film, originally titled Home, which premiered at Austin's South by Southwest Film Festival in 2014. Before distribution, McCarthy changed the film's name to At the Devil's Door at IFC's suggestion. That same year McCarthy served as executive producer on a sequel to The Pact starring the first film's original leads, but written and directed by Dallas Hallam and Patrick Horvath. McCarthy had no creative involvement with the sequel.

McCarthy was approached by French horror film directors Julien Maury and Alexandre Bustillo to make an English language version of their film Livid, but the project fell through. In 2016 McCarthy was featured as part of the 17-disc Blu-ray set Feast, commemorating the life and films of Herschell Gordon Lewis. That same year he contributed a short film about the Easter Bunny to the horror film anthology Holidays. The short was praised by both secular and religious writers online as a disturbing examination of faith.

McCarthy directed the horror-thriller The Prodigy for Orion Pictures, which was released on February 8, 2019. The film was written by Jeff Buhler and starred Taylor Schilling and Jackson Robert Scott.

As a screenwriter, McCarthy co-wrote Body Cam and White Smoke for Paramount Pictures. He was also a writer on director Tim Story's 2022 horror comedy The Blackening.

McCarthy was also a writer on the Are You Afraid of the Dark? franchise, adapting a live-action film adaptation of the Nickelodeon series for director D.J. Caruso, as well as writing the story for The Tale of the Haunted Woods episode of the 2021 season of the series.

== Award nominations ==
At the 2011 Sundance Film Festival, McCarthy's original short version of The Pact was nominated for a Short Filmmaking Award in the category of U.S. Dramatic Film.

At 2014's South by Southwest Film Festival the audience nominated Home for an award in the Midnighters category.

== Personal life ==
In 2007 McCarthy married college friend Alexandra Lisee, a television, film and video producer who also produced McCarthy's first short for Sundance. They have a daughter, Agatha.

== Filmography ==
Year	Film	Credit	Notes
2004	Maid	Director, written by, composer	Short film, co-directed and co-wrote with Sam Zuckerman
2005	Cry for Help	Director, written by	Short film, co-wrote with Charlie Short
2009	Chinese Box	Director, written by	Short film
2011	The Pact	Director, written by	Short film
2011	Catch .44	Special thanks	
2012	The Pact	Director, written by	
2014	At the Devil's Door	Director, written by	
2016	Holidays	Director, written by	Easter segment
2016	Love is Dead	Special thanks	Short film
2017	The Neighbor	Special thanks	
2017	Jackals	Thanks	
2017	Final Vision	Director	TV movie
2019	The Prodigy	Director	
2020	Body Cam	Screenplay by	Co-wrote screenplay with Richard Riedel, based on a story by Richard Reidel
