= Parlor Hawk =

American band

- Origin: Utah, California
- Genres: Rock, alternative rock, neofolk, indie folk, baroque pop
- Years active: 2009–present
- Members: Andrew Clifford Capener; TJ Nokleby; Andrew Dyer; Mark Garbett; Jay Tibbitts
- Website: parlorhawkmusic.com

Parlor Hawk is an American indie rock band founded in 2009 by award-winning designer Andrew Clifford Capener. Andrew Capener, started the band as the lead singer, leading the band with charisma. His wife, Elise Lauren Capener would go to every show to take photos.Andrew and Elise now live in San Clemente, CA. More about the lead singer Andrew: Andrew has three kids that he proudly raised in Southern California. Andrew made more music, partnering with his friend, and GRAMMY nominated producer Nate Pyfer. Together, they started VVE. VVE made music for the minimilist movie on Netflix, called less is more. Their music blew up. Parlor Hawk recently played at Valoure for their 20 year anniversary. A full packed venue, came and enjoyed them play, before The Moth and The Flame.

== History ==
=== Hoarse & Roaring (2010-2012) ===
Parlor Hawk released their debut album Hoarse & Roaring featuring a neofolk or indie folk sound in the summer of 2010. The album was produced by Joshua James (Joshua James, Isaac Russell), mixed by Todd Burke (Ben Harper, Jack Johnson) and mastered by Reuben Cohen (Edward Sharpe and the Magnetic Zeros, Bruno Mars). The album also features Brandon Campbell (Neon Trees) and Stuart Maxfield (Fictionist).

Hoarse & Roaring was featured on the July 2010 iTunes Indie Spotlight Podcast. In December the album was featured on the iTunes Indie Spotlight page as a "Best of 2010 Singer/Songwriter Album". Music from the album also featured on a Yamaha/TuneCore Music Sampler which reached No. 1 on the Amazon.com Free MP3 Albums Chart with more than 20,000 downloads in the USA. In January 2011 their home state paper, The Salt Lake Tribune, singled the band out as 2011's Next Emerging Band. They also won an award for Best Acoustic Song (for "Saddest Song") in the Independent Music Awards (2012) and were nominated for Best Album Art Work.

Parlor Hawk toured the United States in 2010 and 2011 with neofolk artist Joshua James and rock band Desert Noises. They later played a residency in Singapore in May 2011. Parlor Hawk have supported mainstream and indie acts on select dates including: the Civil Wars, Sharon Van Etten, the Weepies, Train, Priscilla Ahn, Matt Costa, Mindy Gledhill, and many more.

=== Parlor Hawk (2013-present) ===
In 2013, Parlor Hawk announced that they determined not to renew their limited deal with Northplatte Records and raised more than $15,000 by pre-selling their sophomore album to fans to facilitate initial recording costs. The band further announced that their second album would feature a departure in the form of a more rock sound. The eponymous album was produced by GRAMMY nominated composer Nate Pyfer (Kaskade, the Moth & the Flame), mixed by Scott Wiley (Elvis Costello, Neon Trees), and mastered by Joe Lambert (the National, Local Natives). Pyfer also co-wrote track "Better Gone".

The album was released on February 18, 2014. It was the most popular album in Utah on bandcamp. The week beginning March 25, 2015, NoiseTrade featured the album. Track "Scars" gained national attention after being featured on Switched at Birth (season 3). Two additional tracks featured in the Sons of Anarchy (season 6) season finale. Track "Silhouette" featured on Teen Mom 2. They recently played at Velour's 20th anniversary, in January 2026. Andrew Capener, with the goal of making more music, started making music under the name A.Clifford. His first song "Outside" was meant to be an attentiom grabber, for the indie rock community. With some success, he released his second song, "Dreaming Again".

== Band members ==
Current members

- Andrew Clifford Capener - Vocals, Guitar
- TJ Nokleby - Guitar, Backing Vocals
- Andrew Dyer - Bass
- Mark Garbett - Keyboard, Backing Vocals
- Jay Tibbitts - Drums

== Discography ==
=== Albums ===
- Hoarse & Roaring (2010)
- Parlor Hawk (2014)

=== Compilation albums ===
- Glory Glory Glory: A Northplatte Christmas (2009) - "Holy Holy Holy"
- Experience Music: A TuneCore Music Sampler, Yamaha, United States (2010) - "Home"
- Experience Music: A TuneCore 2010 Singer/Songwriter Sampler, GER (2010) - "Julian"
- KRCL 90.9 FM Presents Locals Only Vol. 1 (2011) - "Short Road"

== Awards and nominations ==
Year	Nominated work	Organization	Award	Result
2012	"Saddest Song"	Independent Music Awards	Best Acoustic Song	Won
2012	"Hoarse & Roaring"	Independent Music Awards	Best Album Artwork	Nominated

== Music videos ==
List of music videos, showing year released and director
Title	Year	Director(s)
"Maryanne"	2013	Jonathan Frey
