= Sorry =

Sorry is a word commonly used in apologizing.

Sorry may also refer to:

== Film and television ==
- Sorry (2002 film), a 2002 Japanese film
- Sorry (2021 film), a 2021 comedy film
- Sorry: A Love Story, an upcoming Pakistani film
- Sorry, a 2002 skateboarding video by Flip Skateboards
- Sorry! (TV series), a 1980s British sitcom

== Games ==
- Sorry! (game), a board game
  - Sorry! (video game), a 1998 game based on the board game

== Literature ==
- Sorry (novel), a 2007 novel by Gail Jones
- Sorry, a novel by Zoran Drvenkar

== Music ==
=== Performers ===
- Sorry (band), an English indie band
- Scott Sorry (1978–2025), American singer-songwriter

=== Albums ===
- Sorry! (album) or the title song, by Catherine, 1994
- Sorry (Meg Myers album) or the title song, 2015
- Sorry (White Lung album), 2012
- Sorry, by Mai Yamane, 1981
- Sorry, by Severina, 2023

=== Songs ===
- "Sorry" (Beyoncé song), 2016
- "Sorry" (Bic Runga song), 1999
- "Sorry" (Buckcherry song), 2007
- "Sorry" (Ciara song), 2012
- "Sorry" (Doris Day song), 1967
- "Sorry" (Easybeats song), 1966
- "Sorry" (Grace Jones song), 1976
- "Sorry" (Halsey song), 2017
- "Sorry" (IDER song), 2016
- "Sorry" (Justin Bieber song), 2015
- "Sorry" (Madness song), 2007
- "Sorry" (Madonna song), 2006
- "Sorry" (Naya Rivera song), 2013
- "Sorry" (NF and James Arthur song), 2025
- "Sorry" (Nothing But Thieves song), 2017
- "Sorry" (The Paddingtons song), 2005
- "Sorry" (Rick Ross song), 2015
- "Sorry" (T.I. song), 2012
- "Sorry (I Didn't Know)", by Monsta Boy, 2000; covered by Joel Corry, 2019
- "Sorry (I Ran All the Way Home)", by the Impalas, 1959
- "Sorry", by 6lack from East Atlanta Love Letter, 2018
- "Sorry", by As It Is from Never Happy, Ever After, 2015
- "Sorry", by Ashlee Simpson from Autobiography, 2004
- "Sorry", by Beabadoobee from Fake It Flowers, 2020
- "Sorry", by Beartooth from Pure Ecstasy, 2026
- "Sorry", by Ben Adams, 2005
- "Sorry", by Crazy Town from Darkhorse, 2002
- "Sorry", by Cueshé from Half Empty Half Full, 2005
- "Sorry", by Daughtry from Daughtry, 2006
- "Sorry", by Demis Roussos from Man of the World, 1980
- "Sorry", by Future from Hndrxx, 2017
- "Sorry", by Gabriella Cilmi from Lessons to Be Learned, 2008
- "Sorry", by Guns N' Roses from Chinese Democracy, 2008
- "Sorry", by Jimmy Barnes from Love and Fear, 1999
- "Sorry", by Jonas Brothers from A Little Bit Longer, 2008
- "Sorry", by Lauren Jauregui from Prelude, 2021
- "Sorry", by Macklemore from Ben, 2023
- "Sorry", by Moloko from I Am Not a Doctor, 1998
- "Sorry", by the Moth & The Flame from &, 2013
- "Sorry", by Mýa from K.I.S.S. (Keep It Sexy & Simple), 2011
- "Sorry", by Natalie Cole from I Love You So, 1979
- "Sorry", by Pat Benatar from Go, 2003
- "Sorry", by Severina, 2023
- "Sorry", by Sheppard from Watching the Sky, 2018
- "Sorry", by Simon Townshend from Moving Target, 1985
- "Sorry", by Sleeping with Sirens from Feel, 2013
- "Sorry", by Status Quo from Thirsty Work, 1994
- "Sorry", by Tears for Fears from Raoul and the Kings of Spain, 1995
- "Sorry", by Toni Braxton from Sex & Cigarettes, 2018
- "Sorry", by UB40 from Promises and Lies, 1993
- "Sorry", by Wonder Girls from Wonder Party, 2012
- "Sorry", by Yo Gotti from I Am, 2013
- "Sorry", by Zion I from Deep Water Slang V2.0, 2003
- "Sorry", by Alan Walker featuring Isák, 2021

== See also ==
- Apology (disambiguation)
- I'm Sorry (disambiguation)
- Regret (emotion)
- Sorry Sorry (disambiguation)
