= Hoarse & Roaring =

Studio album by Parlor Hawk
- Released: June 2010
- Recorded: 2010 at Willamette Mountain Studio (American Fork, Utah, United States)
- Genre: folk, indie folk, neofolk
- Label: Northplatte Records
- Producer: Joshua James

Parlor Hawk chronology
Hoarse & Roaring (2010)	Parlor Hawk (2014)

Professional ratings
Review scores
Source	Rating
themusiccritic.co.uk	5/5 stars
Salt Lake City Weekly	(very favorable)
SLUG Magazine	(favorable)

Hoarse & Roaring is the debut full-length album by American neofolk band Parlor Hawk, released in 2010 on Northplatte Records. The album was produced by Joshua James and featured Neon Trees bassist Branden Campbell on each track (except "Saddest Song") as well as Fictionist member Stuart Maxfield on the tracks "14 Years" and "Home". It was mixed by Todd Burke (Ben Harper, Jack Johnson) and mastered by Reuben Cohen (Edward Sharpe & The Magnetic Zeros, Bruno Mars).

The album was chosen by iTunes Indie Spotlight as a "Best of 2010 Singer/Songwriter Album" and was featured on the Indie Spotlight page alongside other notable albums from that year.

== Track listing ==
All tracks are written by Andrew C Capener except as noted.

No.	Title	Writer(s)	Length
1.	"Home"	Capener, Joshua James	3:03
2.	"Like Thieves"	Capener, Joshua James, McKay Stevens	3:45
3.	"Every Bone"	Capener, Joshua James, McKay Stevens	3:02
4.	"Julian"	Capener, Joshua James, McKay Stevens	3:45
5.	"Short Road"	Capener, Joshua James, McKay Stevens	3:15
6.	"Lie To Me"	Capener, Joshua James, McKay Stevens	5:03
7.	"Second Skin"	Capener, Joshua James	3:20
8.	"Lark"	Capener	3:53
9.	"Flowers"	Capener, Joshua James, McKay Stevens	3:15
10.	"14 Years"	Capener, Joshua James, McKay Stevens	3:38
11.	"Saddest Song"	Capener, Mark Garbett	2:24

== Personnel ==
Parlor Hawk

- Andrew Clifford Capener– vocals, rhythm guitar
- TJ Nockleby– guitar
- Mark Garbett– piano, wurlitzer, additional vocals
- Jay Tibbitts– drums

Additional musicians

- Pat Campbell– additional drums, percussion
- Branden Campbell– bass guitar (tracks 1 to 10)
- Dylan Schorer- pedal steel guitar, lap steel (track 4)
- Brian Hardy– Hammond B3 organ (tracks 2,5,7)
- Sayde Price– additional vocals (tracks 4,6,8)
- Evan Coulombe– nylon string guitar (track 10)
- Nate Pyfer– mellotron, string arrangements, additional vocals (track 3)
- Rachel Hicken– violin (track 8)
- Jarom Xochimitl– cello (tracks 6,8)
- Stuart Maxfield– mandolin, violin (tracks 1, 10)

== Awards ==
Year	Nominated work	Organization	Award	Result
2012	"Saddest Song"	Independent Music Awards	Best Acoustic Song	Won
2012	"Hoarse & Roaring"	Independent Music Awards	Best Album Artwork	Nominated
