= Parlor Hawk (album) =

Studio album by Parlor Hawk
- Released: February 18, 2014
- Recorded: 2013 at June Audio Recording Studios (Provo, Utah, United States)
- Genre: alt rock, indie folk, baroque pop
- Producer: Nate Pyfer

Parlor Hawk chronology
| Hoarse & Roaring (2010) | Parlor Hawk (2014) |

Professional ratings
Review scores
| Source | Rating |
|---|---|
| Daily Herald | (very favorable) |
| SLUG Magazine | (very favorable) |

Parlor Hawk is the second full-length album by indie rock band Parlor Hawk. It was released on February 18, 2014. The album was produced by GRAMMY nominated composer and friend Nate Pyfer (Kaskade, The Moth & the Flame). It was mixed by Scott Wiley (Elvis Costello, Neon Trees) and mastered by Joe Lambert (The National, Local Natives, Animal Collective).

== Media usage ==
Tracks "Better Gone" and "We Better Run" featured in the season 6 finale of Sons of Anarchy. Track "Scars" featured in the Switched at Birth season 3 episode "The Scream". Track "Silhouette" featured on Teen Mom 2 (2014). NoiseTrade featured the album the week of March 25, 2014.

== Music video ==
The "Maryanne" music video debuted on August 30, 2013. It was directed by Jonathan Frey and filmed on a Canon 5D Mark II. The video centers on a man and the widow of his recently deceased brother. The song is about losing a loved one and learning to cope with the people you still have as evidenced by the lyrics “Maryanne, please take my hand, though it is hard for you and I don’t understand.”

== Track listing ==
All tracks are written by Parlor Hawk except as noted.

| No. | Title | Writer(s) | Length |
|---|---|---|---|
| 1. | "Blue Moon" | Parlor Hawk | 3:03 |
| 2. | "Broken Home" | Parlor Hawk | 3:23 |
| 3. | "Better Gone" | Parlor Hawk, Nate Pyfer | 3:41 |
| 4. | "Maryanne" | Parlor Hawk | 3:04 |
| 5. | "Save Me" | Parlor Hawk | 2:09 |
| 6. | "Silhouette" | Parlor Hawk | 3:21 |
| 7. | "Scars" | Parlor Hawk | 2:32 |
| 8. | "We Better Run" | Parlor Hawk | 3:15 |
| 9. | "The Wind" | Parlor Hawk | 3:42 |
| 10. | "Dreams" | Parlor Hawk | 1:48 |
| 11. | "Wherever I Come From" | Parlor Hawk | 3:10 |

== Personnel ==
Parlor Hawk

- Andrew Clifford Capener– vocals, rhythm guitar
- TJ Nockleby– guitar
- Andrew Dyer– bass
- Mark Garbett– piano, additional vocals
- Jay Tibbitts– drums
