= Apology =

Apology, The Apology, apologies, apologize/apologise, apologist, apologetics, or apologetic may refer to:

== Common uses ==
- Apology (act), an expression of remorse or regret
- Apologia, a formal defense of an opinion, position, or action

== Arts, entertainment, and media ==
=== Literature ===
- Apology (Plato), Plato's recording of Socrates' defense at trial
- Apology (Xenophon), Xenophon's version of Socrates' defense
- A Mathematician's Apology (1940), an essay by British mathematician G. H. Hardy
- Apologeticus or Apology (c. AD 197) of Tertullian
- Apologia Pro Vita Sua (1864), a defense of Catholicism by John Henry Newman
- Apology of the Augsburg Confession (1531), a defense of Lutheranism by Philipp Melanchthon

=== Films and television ===
- Apology (film) (1986), starring Lesley Ann Warren
- The Apology (2016 film), a documentary about World War II "comfort women"
- "The Apology" (Seinfeld), a television episode
- "The Apology" (The Amazing World of Gumball), a television episode
- The Apology (2022 film), starring Anna Gunn
- "Apologies" (The Bear), a 2024 episode of The Bear TV series

=== Music ===
- "Apologize" (song), 2006 song by OneRepublic, later remixed by Timbaland in 2007
- "Apologize" (Ed Ames song), 1967
- "Apology", a song by Lazlo Bane from the album Back Sides, 2006
- "Apology", a song by The Posies from the album Dear 23, 1990
- "Apologize", a song by Hollywood Undead from the 2011 album American Tragedy
- "Apologize", a song by John Lee Hooker from the album John Lee Hooker Plays & Sings the Blues, 1952
- "Apologize", a 1968 song by Peter, Paul and Mary from the album Late Again
- "Apologize", a song by Grandson (musician)
- "Apologize", a song by Baby Keem from the 2019 mixtape Die for My Bitch
- "Apologize", a song by Big Sean from the album Better Me Than You, 2024

== Religion ==
- Apologetics, the systematic theological defense of a religious position
  - Christian apologetics, the defense of Christianity

== Other uses ==
- Apology (horse) (1871–1888), a British Triple Crown winning Thoroughbred
- The Apology to Australia's Indigenous peoples, also known as The Apology, made by Prime Minister Kevin Rudd in 2008
- Mr. Apology a.k.a. Allan Bridge (1945–1995), American conceptual artist

== See also ==
- ApologetiX, a Christian parody band founded in 1992
- Apologies to the Queen Mary (2005), an album by Wolf Parade
- "All Apologies", a 1993 song by Nirvana
- I Apologize (disambiguation)
- No Apologies (disambiguation)
- Pranāma, also known as the apology hand gesture, common in India
- Regret (emotion)
- Sorry (disambiguation)
