= Thank You, I'm Sorry =

Thank You, I'm Sorry may refer to:

- Thank You, I'm Sorry (band), American emo band
- Thank You, I'm Sorry (film), 2023 Swedish comedy-drama film

== See also ==
- Thank You (disambiguation)
- I'm Sorry (disambiguation)
