= Goldmyth =

- Born: Jenessa Smith
- Origin: Utah
- Genres: electropop, indie pop, lo-fi
- Instruments: harp, singing
- Website: goldmythmusic.com

Goldmyth is the stage name for Jenessa Smith, a harpist and songwriter who performs indie pop in Provo, Utah. She learned to play the harp as a teenager, and is influenced by indie rock. Critics praised her ethereal and melancholy harp sounds in her tightly produced indie-pop songs from her EP Faded Dream (2017). Her single "My Mistake" had a similar reception. "Lover's Letdown" was featured in the pilot episode of the HBO series The Sex Lives of College Girls.

== Background and influences ==
Smith took harp and piano lessons as a child. As a teenager, she listened to indie rock. Her influences are Joni Mitchell, James Blake, Sufjan Stevens. and Death Cab for Cutie. Nate Pyfer and Mason Porter co-produced her EP Faded Dream. Pyfer previously produced for Kaskade and The Moth & The Flame, while Porter has produced for Haarlem and Polytype. Smith said that Robbie Connolly was helpful in getting her solo project off the ground. Smith writes her songs using a harp and a looper in Provo, Utah.

== Critical reception ==
At Cover Me, Ben Easton praised Smith's music, describing it as "washed-out and blissful, filled with malaise yet still musically vivid." HillyBilly praised Smith's Faded Dream (2017) EP for showing "undisputed skill in crafting tight, concise indie-pop compositions." Paste magazine described her vocals as "otherworldly" in songs with "vulnerable lyrics." Birch Street Radio reviewed Smith's debut EP, Faded Dream, describing her music as a blend of her "delicate" voice with "harp [and] layers of synth and percussion." Obscure Sound described "Lover's Letdown" as alternating between rhythmically sparse and lush and "infused with glistening harp sounds".

Her single "My Mistake" has a "melancholic pop sound" and "lush vocals" in a song with "excellent production and songwriting," according to indie music review site Obscure Sound. Birch Street Radio included the song in their July 2020 roundup and noticed that the harp took center stage. Indie Shuffle also liked the harp's unique role in the song, writing that it created an "organically magical sound." At Cost Magazine liked the song's "quiet pensiveness" and its "ephemeral fade". Smith wrote the song after reflecting on her mistakes, or lack thereof, after a long-term relationship ended and she moved to LA.

Smith said that when she first heard Gorillaz's "Melancholy Hill", she felt a kinship with a song that led her to cover it. Smith's song, "Lover's Letdown", was featured in the first episode of the HBO series The Sex Lives of College Girls.
