= Apologia (disambiguation) =

An apologia (Ancient Greek: ἀπολογία) is a speech or writing that defends the speaker or author's position.

Apologia may also refer to:

- Apology (Plato)
- Apology (Xenophon)
- Apologia Pro Vita Sua, a Christian studies book
- Apologia (album), a 2002 indie album

== See also ==
- Apology (disambiguation)
- Apologetics
- Christian apologetics
