= Nate Pyfer =

American singer

Nathe Pyfer
- Born: Kenneth Nathaniel Pyfer
- Origin: Provo, Utah, United States
- Genres: Rock, alternative rock, electronica, folk
- Occupations: Producer, musician, songwriter, singer, teacher
- Years active: 2011–present
- Label: Defend Music

Kenneth Nathaniel Pyfer is an American record producer and songwriter/composer. Pyfer has collaborated with Kaskade and producer Finn Bjarnson on a number of projects including co-writing the Grammy nominated single "Atmosphere" on the eponymous album.

Nate Pyfer was a founding member of the bands Code Hero, Night Night, Pinguin Mofex The Moth & The Flame, and his newest musical project Mr. Tape. He also toured as a member of Joshua James' band during the late 2000s.

Remixes and collaborations released by Pyfer and his associates are most often under the pseudonyms "Mr. Tape" or "Wild Children". Notable Wild Children releases include "Catalyst" - Kaskade & Wild Children (Pyfer also sings on the track), "Crystallize Mashup (Wild Children Remix)" - Lindsey Stirling, and "Atmosphere (Wild Children x Neon Trees remix)" - Kaskade.

== Production credits ==
- "American Wanting" - Mr. Anderson, 2021
- "The Zell" - Mideau, 2017
- "Faded Dream" - Goldmyth, 2017
- "Obscene Dream" - Sego, 2016
- "Minimalism" - VVE, 2016
- "Young & Unafraid" – The Moth & The Flame, 2016
- "Giant" – L'anarchiste, 2015
- "TBA" – Mount Saint, 2014
- "FICTIONIST" – Fictionist, 2014
- "The New Tarot EP" - The New Tarot, 2014
- "Parlor Hawk" – Parlor Hawk, 2014
- "Mideau" – Mideau, 2013
- "Basic//Complex" – Polytype, 2012
- "The Moth & The Flame" – The Moth & The Flame, 2011
- "I Am Now" – ALARMs, 2011

== Other credits ==
- "Better Gone" (2013) – songwriting co-credit
- "Atmosphere" (2013) – songwriting co-credit
- "Every Bone" (2010) – mellotron, string arrangements, additional vocals

== See also ==
- Music of Utah
