= Sons of Anarchy season 5 =

Sons of Anarchy
- Season 5
- Season 5 DVD cover
- Starring: Charlie Hunnam; Katey Sagal; Mark Boone Junior; Dayton Callie; Kim Coates; Tommy Flanagan; Ryan Hurst; Theo Rossi; Maggie Siff; Ron Perlman
- No. of episodes: 13

Release
- Original network: FX
- Original release: September 11 – December 4, 2012

Season chronology
- ← Previous; Season 4 Next → Season 6

The fifth season of the American television drama series Sons of Anarchy premiered on September 11, 2012, and concluded on December 4, 2012, after 13 episodes aired on cable network FX. Created by Kurt Sutter, it is about the lives of a close-knit outlaw motorcycle club operating in Charming, a fictional town in California's Central Valley. The show centers on protagonist Jackson "Jax" Teller (Charlie Hunnam), the president of the club, who begins questioning the club and himself after the deaths of several SAMCRO members at the hand of former club president, Clay Morrow (Ron Perlman).

The premiere ("Sovereign"), directed by series executive producer and principal director Paris Barclay and written by series creator and executive producer Kurt Sutter, was one of the highest-rated telecasts in FX's history.

Sons of Anarchy is the story of the Teller-Morrow family of Charming, California, as well as other members of the Sons of Anarchy Motorcycle Club, Redwood Original (SAMCRO), their families, various Charming townspeople, allied and rival gangs, associates, and law agencies that undermine or support SAMCRO's legal and illegal enterprises.

== Plot ==
In retaliation for the death of Veronica Pope (Laroy's girlfriend, who was also the daughter of powerful Oakland kingpin Damon Pope), the Niners attack SAMCRO and ambush a cargo shipment. With the death of Piney Winston and the growing conflict between the Niners and SAMCRO, along with several home invasions targeting people linked to the Club, Jax is forced to meet with Damon Pope, to face a new threat unlike anything SAMCRO has ever faced.

== Cast and characters ==
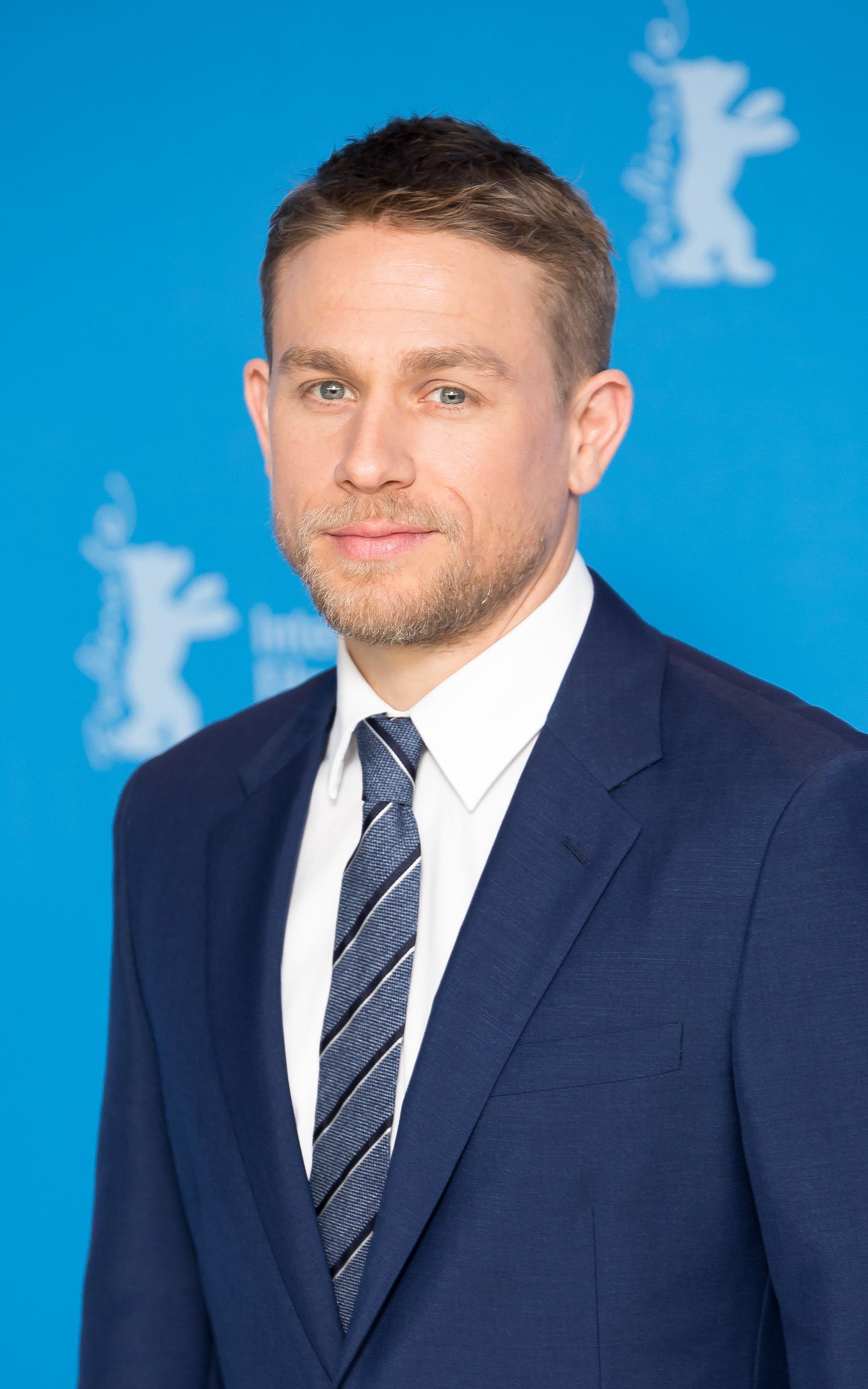
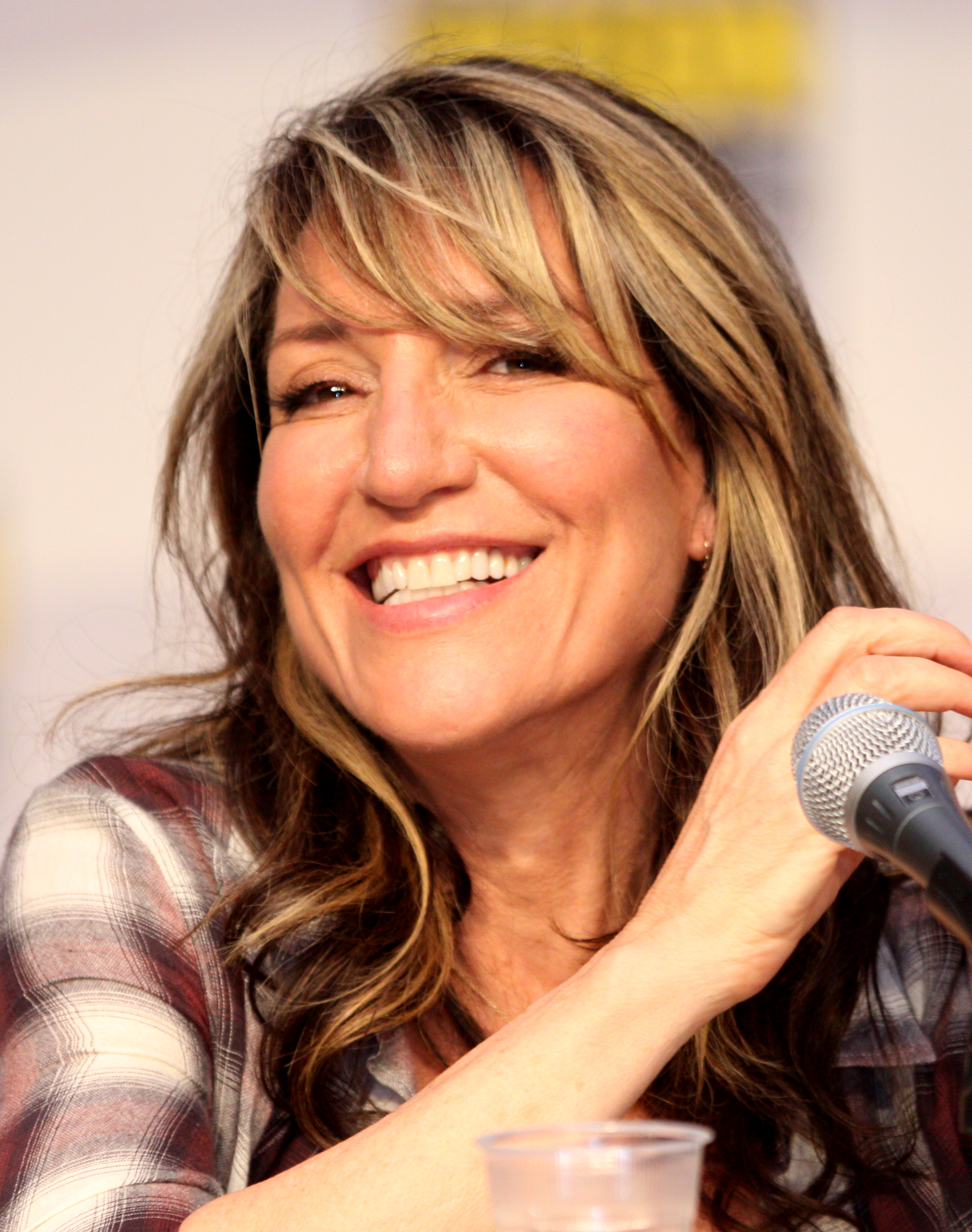
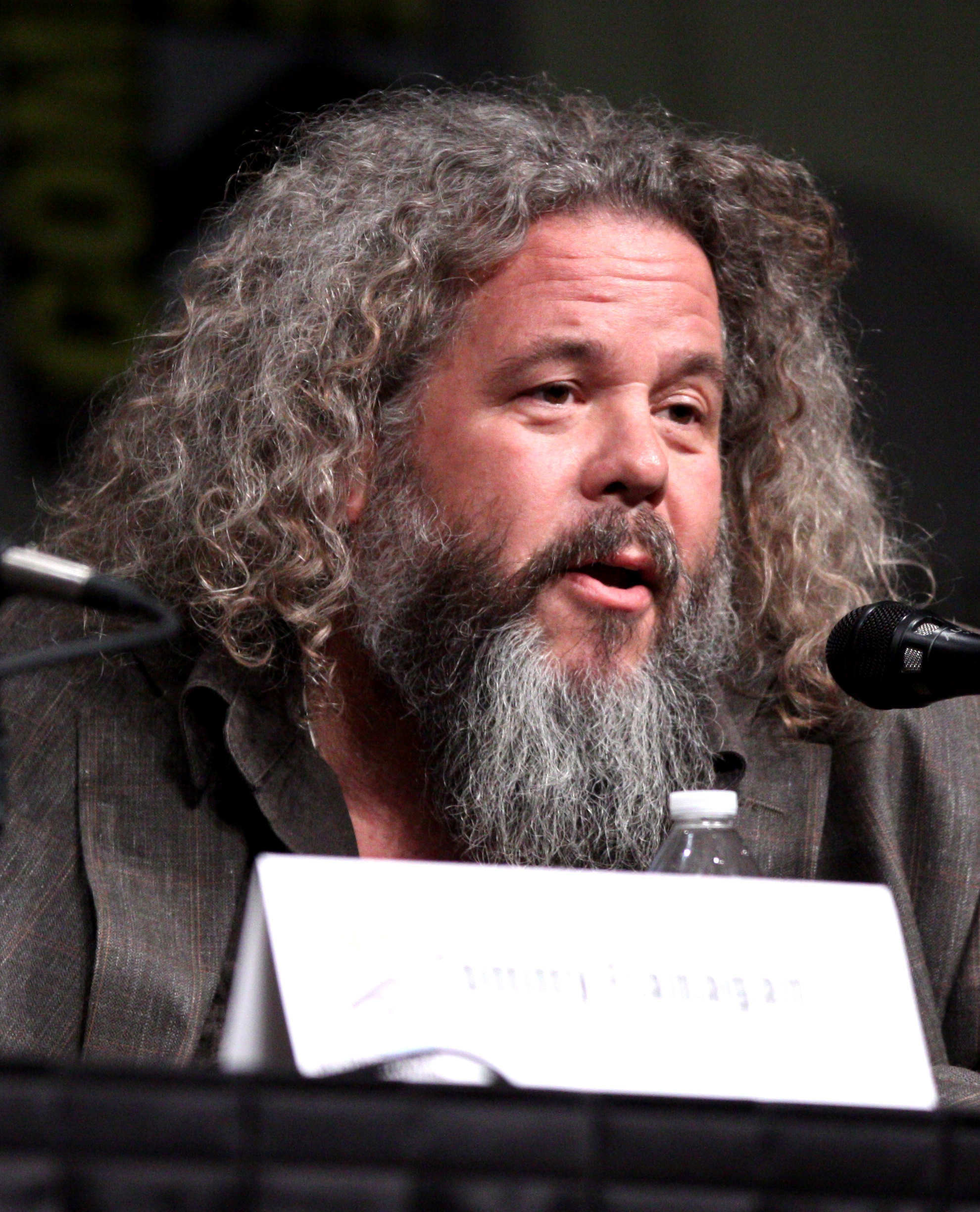
Charlie Hunnam (Jax Teller), Katey Sagal (Gemma Teller Morrow), and Mark Boone Junior (Bobby Munson)
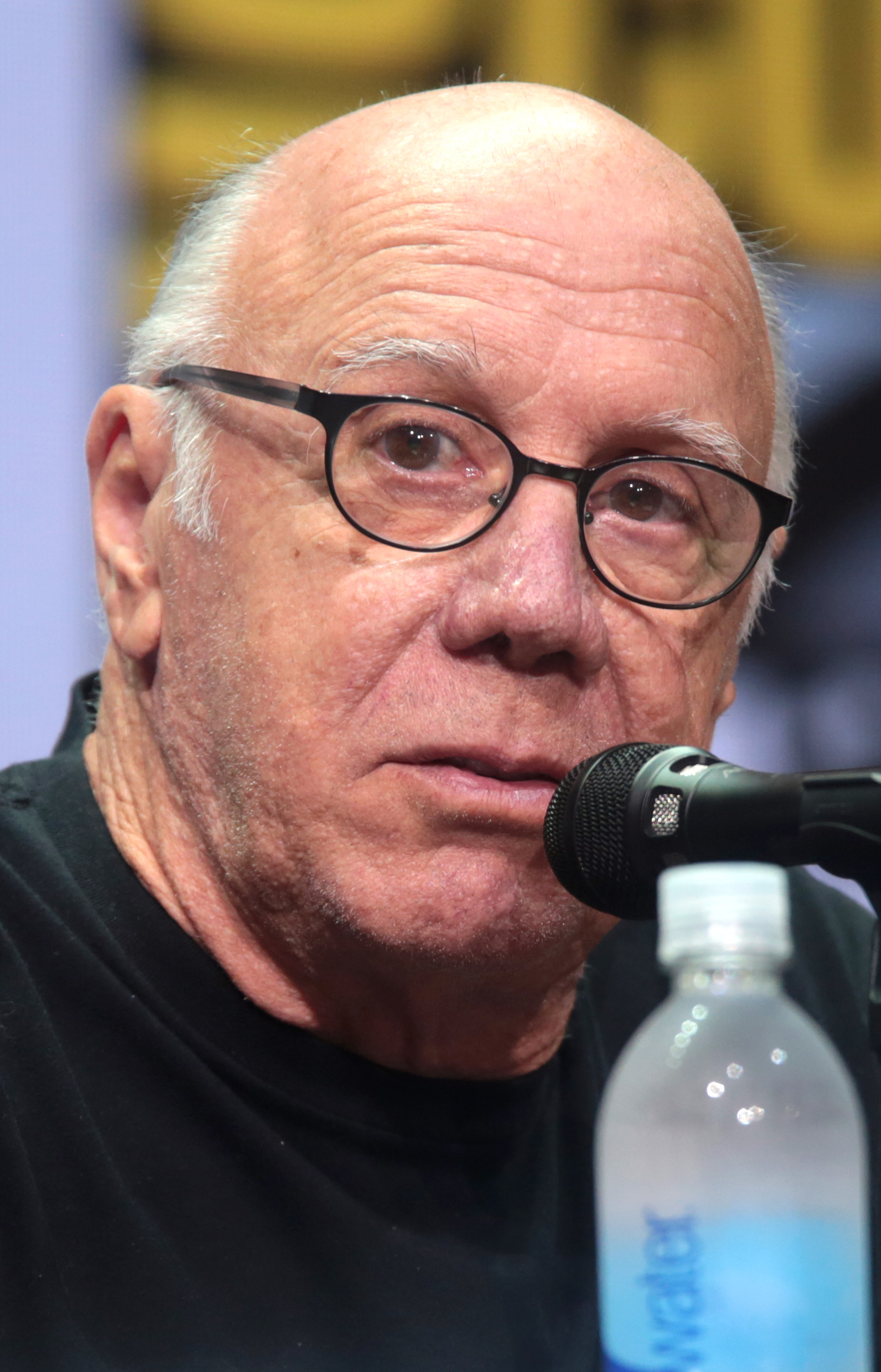
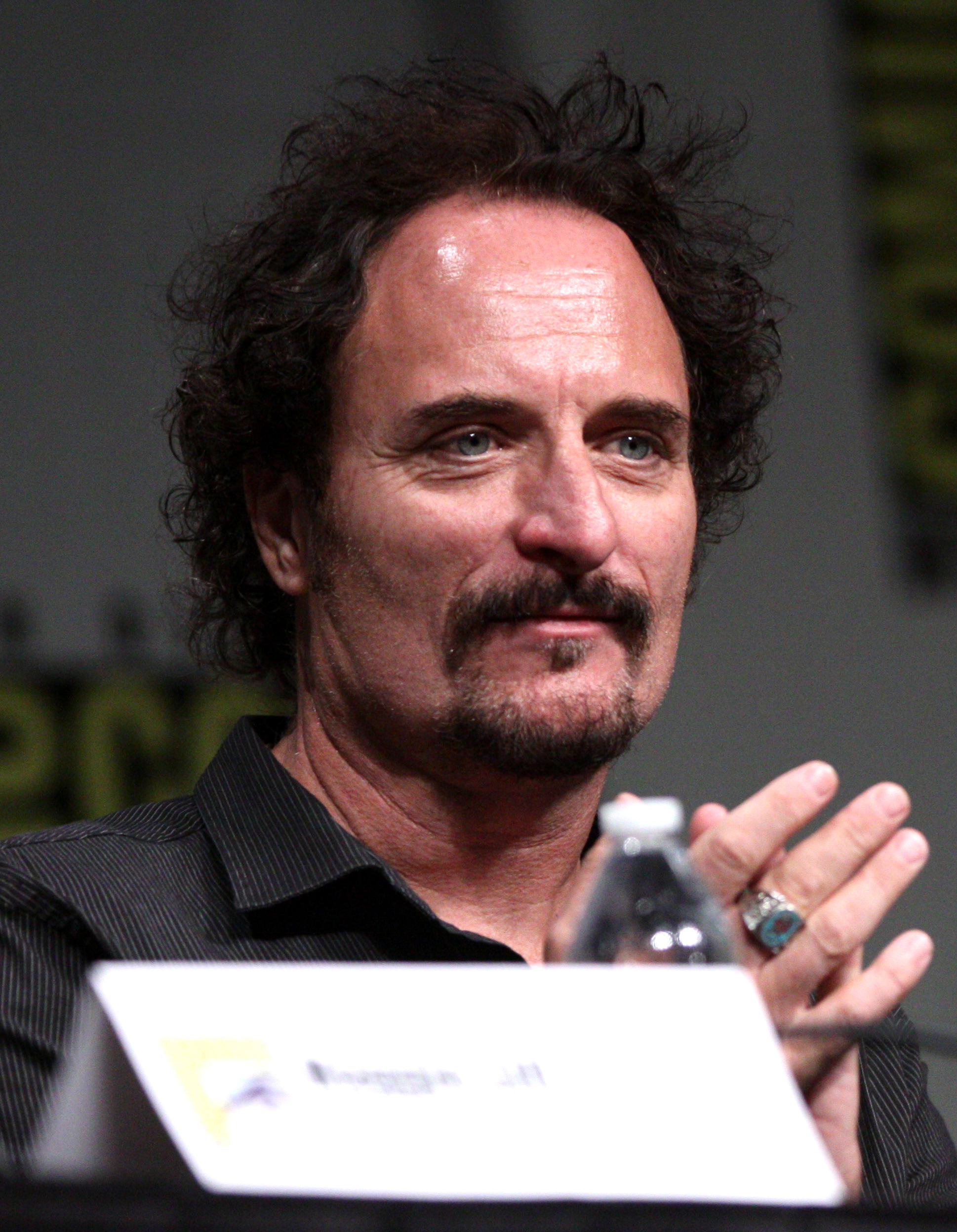
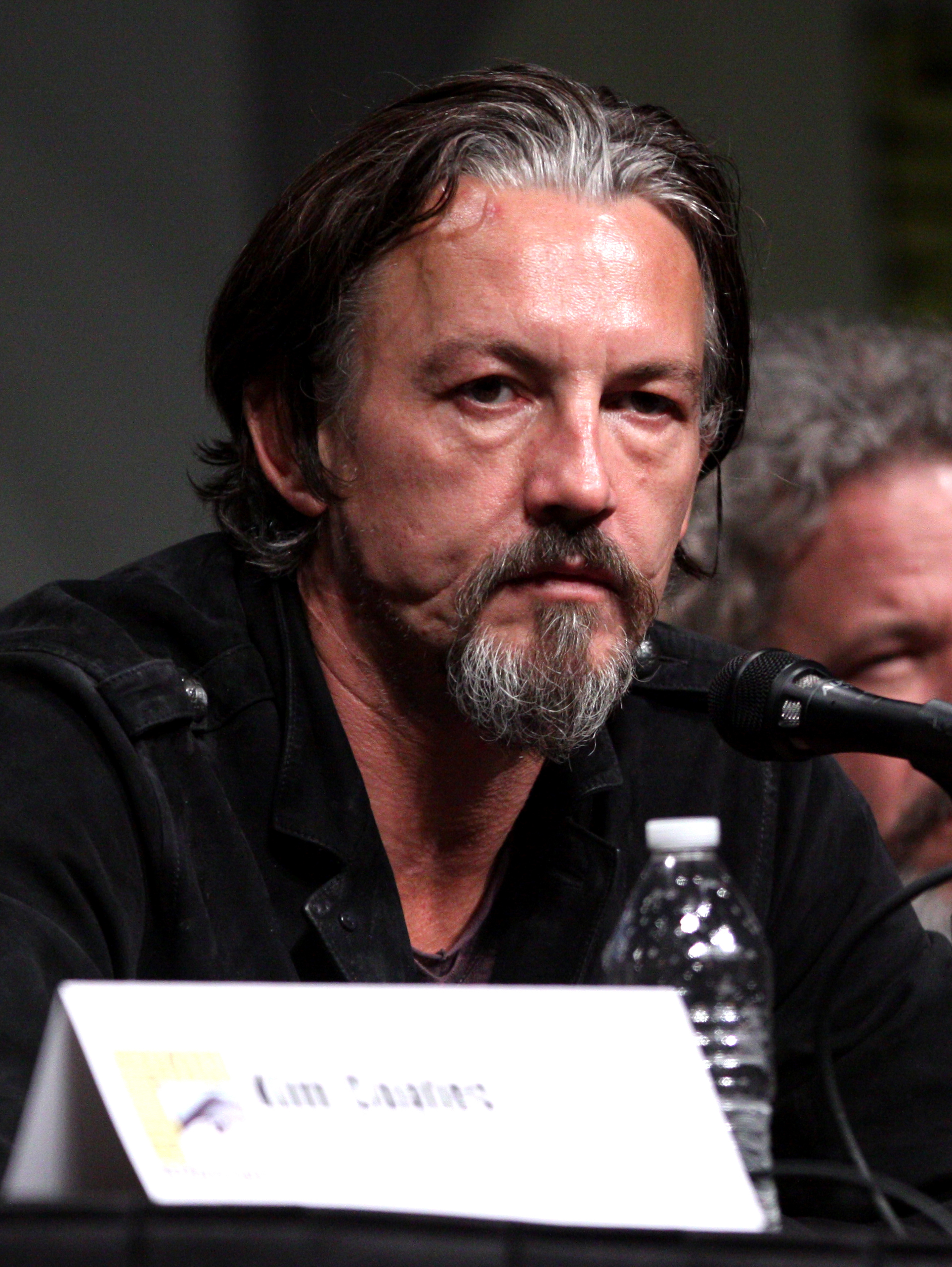
Dayton Callie (Wayne Unser), Kim Coates (Tig Trager) and Tommy Flanagan (Chibs Telford)
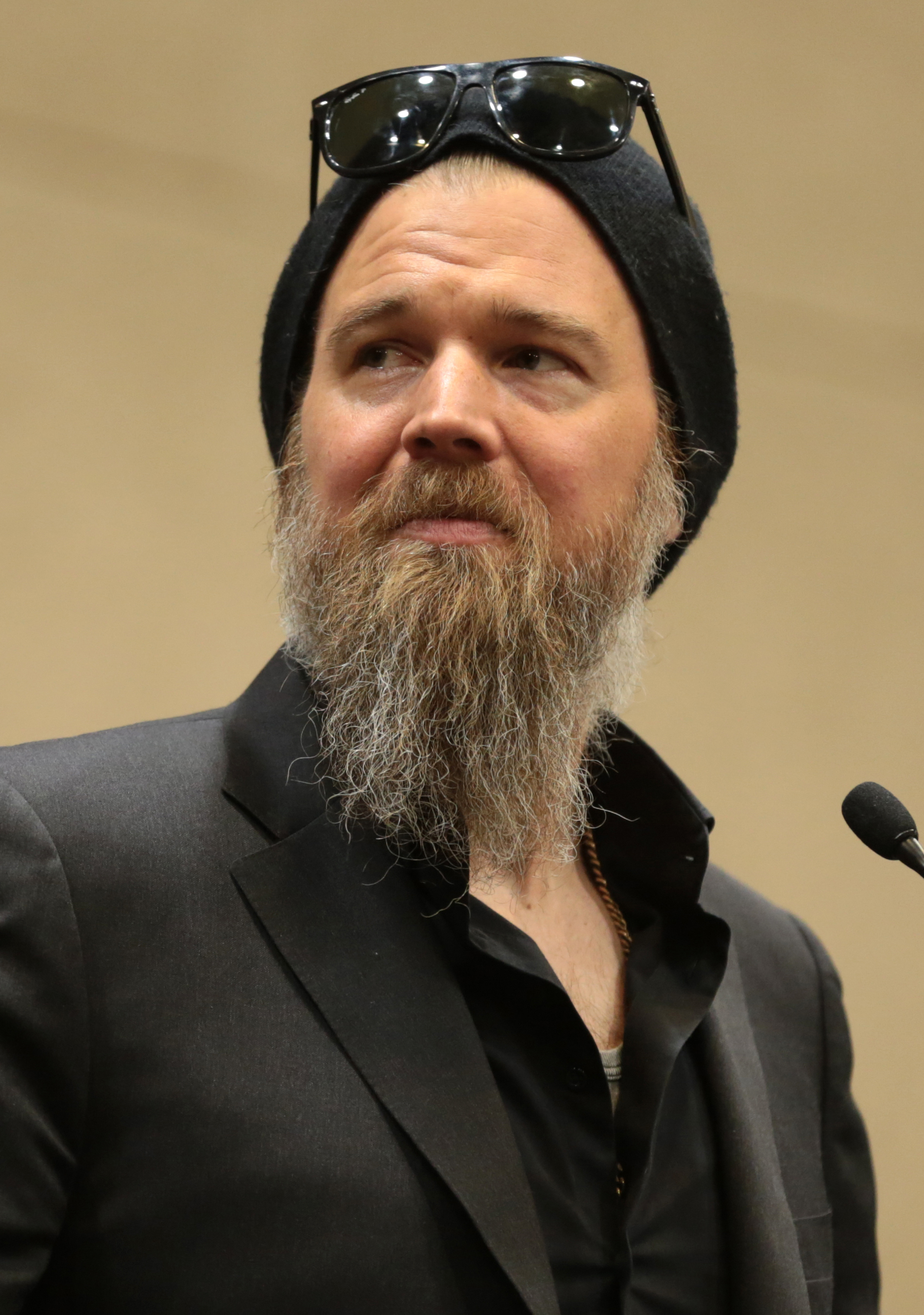
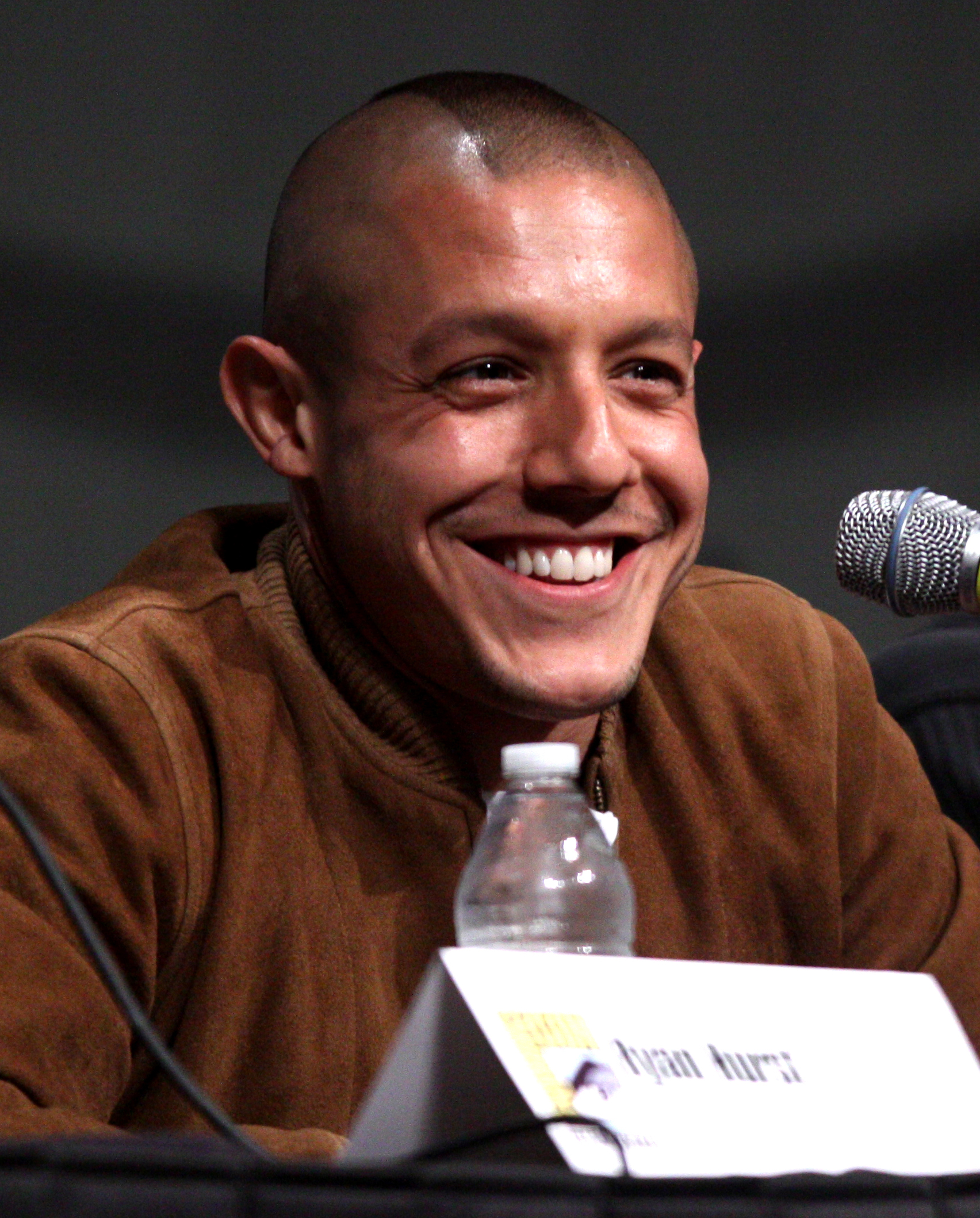
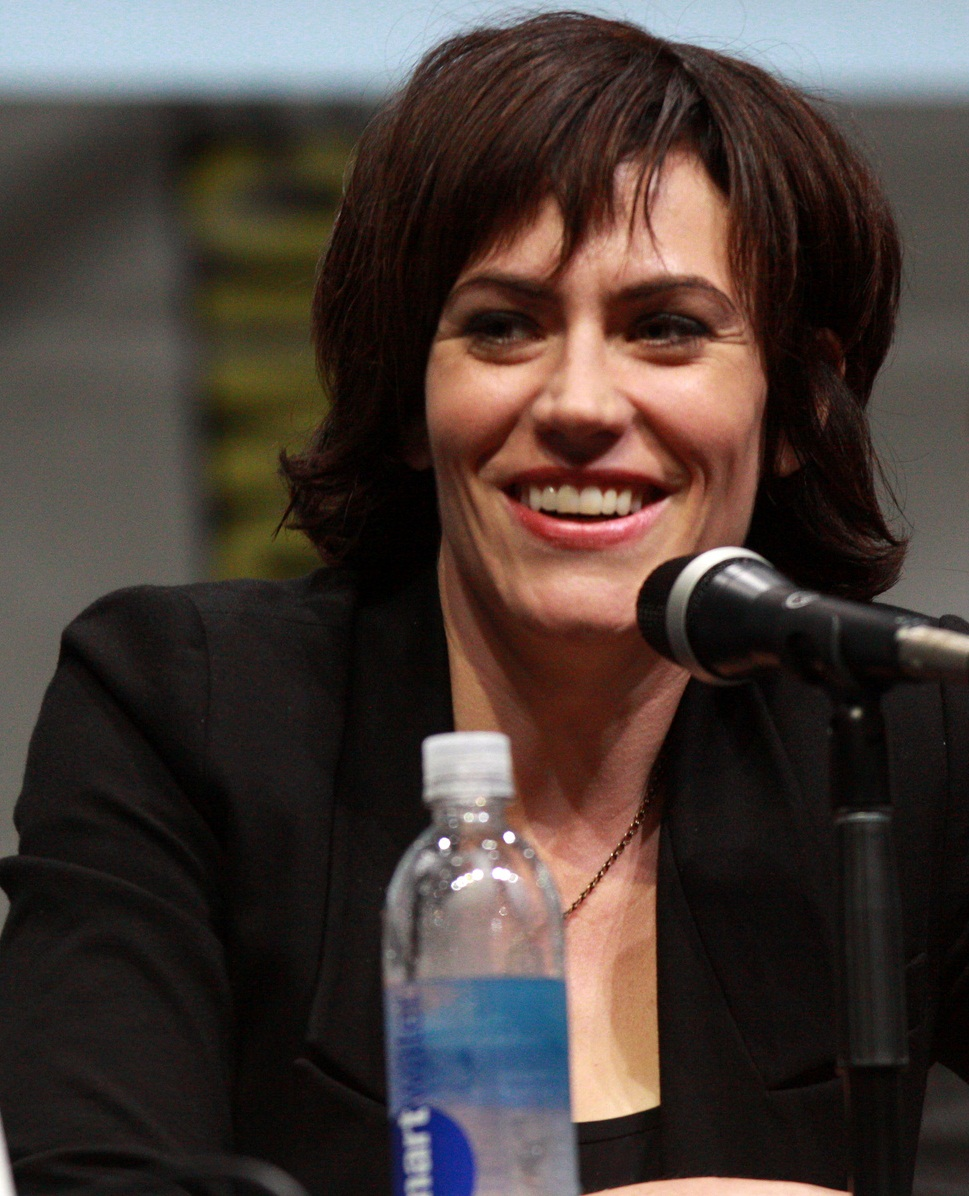
Ryan Hurst (Opie Winston), Theo Rossi (Juice Ortiz), and Maggie Siff (Tara Knowles)
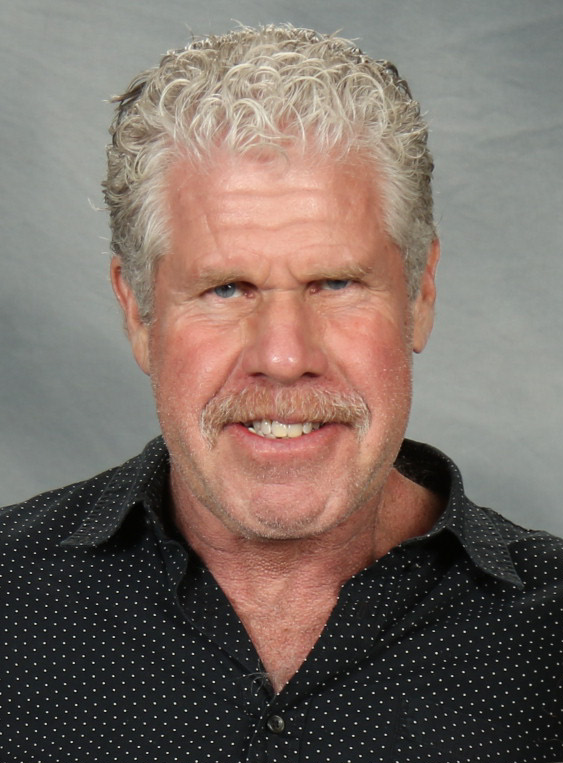
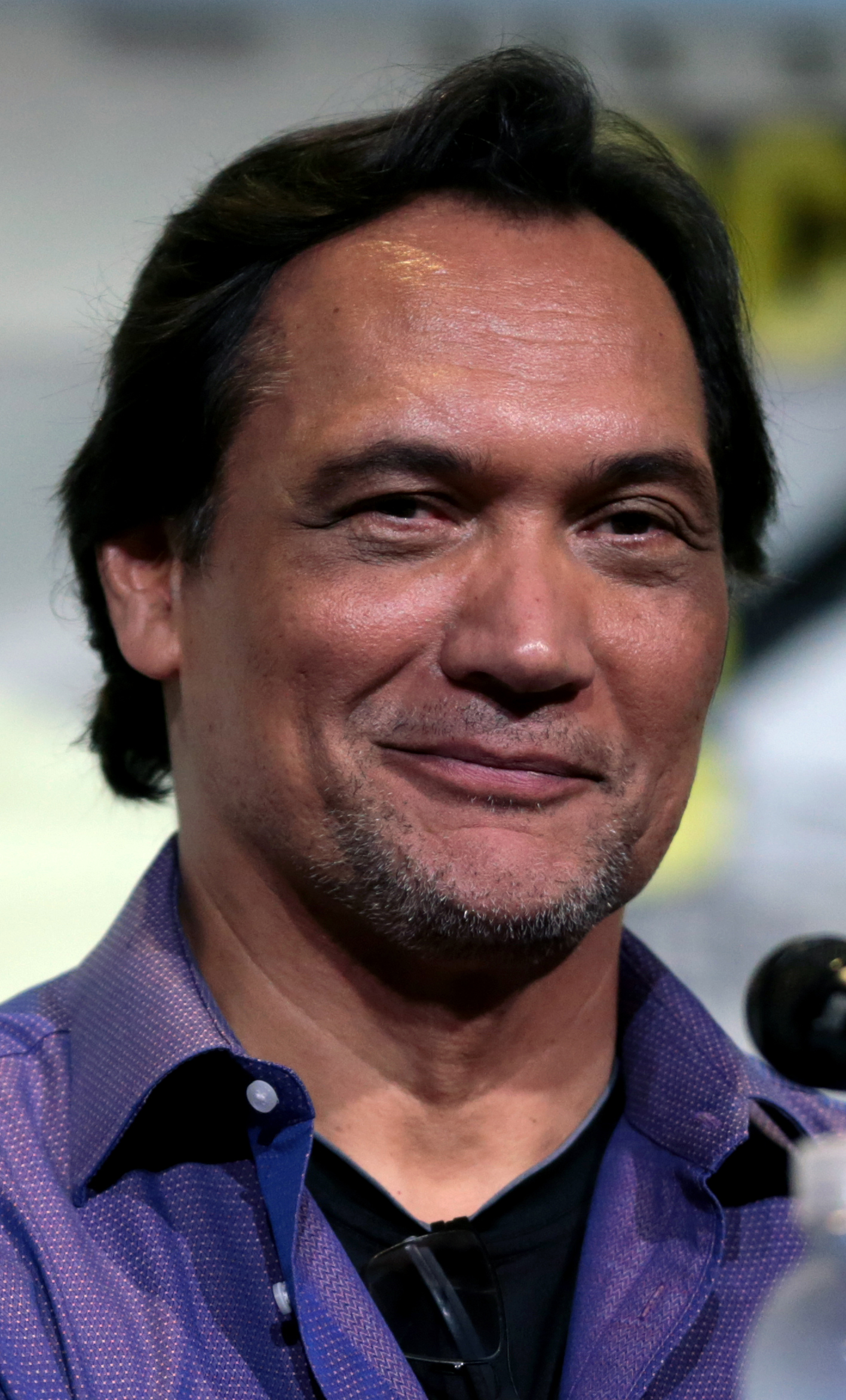
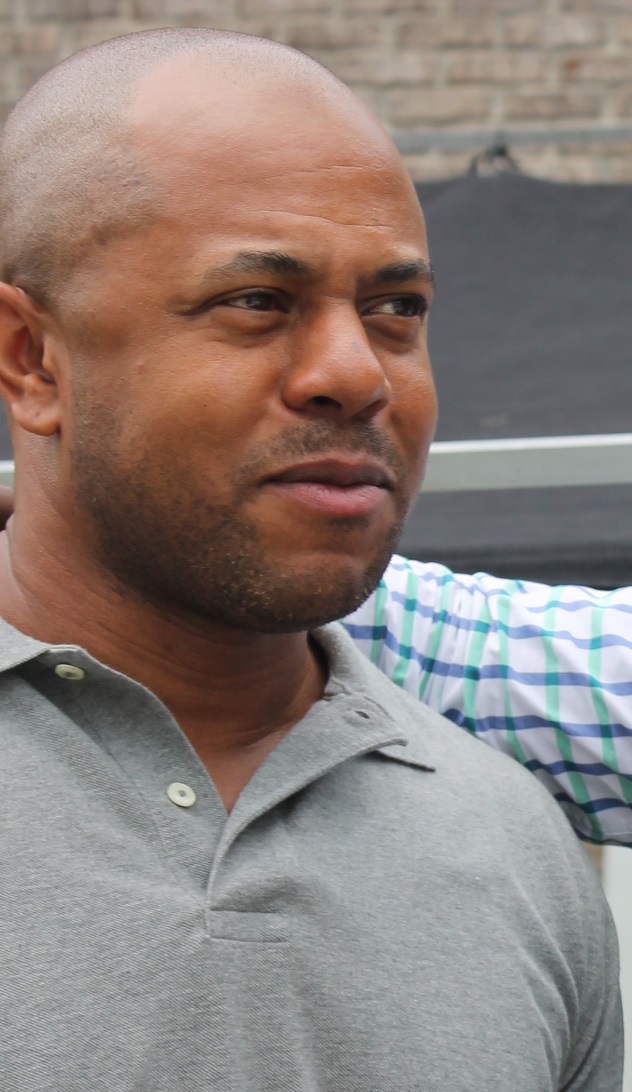
Ron Perlman (Clay Morrow), Jimmy Smits (Nero Padilla), and Rockmond Dunbar (Lieutenant Eli Roosevelt)

Sons of Anarchy is the story of the Teller-Morrow family of Charming, California, as well as the other members of Sons of Anarchy Motorcycle Club, Redwood Original (SAMCRO), their families, various Charming townspeople, allied and rival gangs, associates, and law agencies that undermine or support SAMCRO's legal and illegal enterprises.

=== Main cast ===
- Charlie Hunnam as Jackson "Jax" Teller
- Katey Sagal as Gemma Teller Morrow
- Mark Boone Junior as Robert "Bobby Elvis" Munson
- Dayton Callie as Wayne Unser
- Kim Coates as Alex "Tig" Trager
- Tommy Flanagan as Filip "Chibs" Telford
- Ryan Hurst as Harry "Opie" Winston
- Theo Rossi as Juan-Carlos "Juice" Ortiz
- Maggie Siff as Tara Knowles-Teller
- Ron Perlman as Clarence "Clay" Morrow

=== Special guest cast ===
- Jimmy Smits as Nero Padilla
- Rockmond Dunbar as Lieutenant Eli Roosevelt
- Harold Perrineau as Damon Pope
- Benito Martinez as Luis Torres
- Danny Trejo as Romero "Romeo" Parada
- Drea de Matteo as Wendy Case
- Donal Logue as Lee Toric
- Walton Goggins as Venus Van Dam
- Sonny Barger as Lenny "The Pimp" Janowitz

=== Recurring cast ===
- David LaBrava as Happy Lowman
- Christopher Douglas Reed as Philip "Filthy Phil" Russell
- Chuck Zito as Frankie Diamonds
- Michael Marisi Ornstein as Chuck Marstein
- Winter Ave Zoli as Lyla Winston
- Chris Browning as GoGo
- Kurt Yaeger as Greg "The Peg"
- Wanda De Jesus as Carla
- Niko Nicotera as George "Rat Boy" Skogstorm
- Billy Brown as August Marks
- Reynaldo Gallegos as Fiasco
- McNally Sagal as Margaret Murphy
- Kurt Sutter as "Big" Otto Delaney
- Robin Weigert as Ally Lowen
- Walter Wong as Chris "V-Lin" Von Lin
- Merle Dandridge as Rita Roosevelt
- Jeff Kober as Jacob Hale Jr.
- Timothy V. Murphy as Galen O'Shay
- Kenneth Choi as Henry Lin
- Emilio Rivera as Marcus Alvarez
- Kristen Renton as Ima
- Michael Beach as T.O. Cross

=== Guest stars ===
- Rachel Miner as Dawn Trager
- Ashley Tisdale as Emma Jean
- Joel McHale as Warren
- Dave Navarro as Arcadio Nerona
- Mo McRae as Tyler Yost
- Marshall Allman as Devin Price
- Olivia Burnette as Homeless Woman

== Production ==
Although Sons of Anarchy is set in Northern California's Central Valley, it is filmed primarily at Occidental Studios Stage 5A in North Hollywood. Main sets located there include the clubhouse, St. Thomas Hospital, and Jax's house. The production rooms at the studio used by the writing staff also double as the Charming police station. External scenes are often filmed nearby in Sun Valley and Tujunga.

On his Sons of Anarchy YouTube channel Sutterinksoa, Kurt Sutter has stated that he began writing scripts for season 5, episodes one and two as early as March 1, 2012. It was also announced that Chuck Zito would be joining the Sons cast as a Nomad traveling through Charming. Another announced cast addition for season five is Jimmy Smits. Smits, known for his work in L.A. Law, NYPD Blue, The West Wing and Dexter, will play an escort service owner and former Latino gang member who becomes a mentor to Jax. Harold Perrineau joined the cast in May as the villain Damon Pope.

== Episodes ==
No. overall	No. in season	Title	Directed by	Written by	Original release date	Prod. code	U.S. viewers (millions)
54	1	"Sovereign"	Paris Barclay	Kurt Sutter	September 11, 2012	5WAB01	5.37
Jax's sovereignty has a shaky start after the Niners attack one of SAMCRO's gun shipments. Gemma makes a new ally during a night of drinking. An irritated Tara has trouble ascending to her role as queen and mother. Clay attempts to get back into the club's good graces by revealing part of the truth about Piney's death. Damon Pope and his crew exact appalling revenge on Tig. Opie rebuffs Jax's offer to sit at the table. A series of home invasions rocks Charming, particularly an unsuspecting Unser.
55	2	"Authority Vested"	Peter Weller	Regina Corrado	September 18, 2012	5WAB02	4.17
Jax and Chibs hide out at Nero's brothel, while planning their next move. Tig and the club scour Oakland for Fawn. Clay makes a move that surprises Bobby and Opie. In the midst of chaos, Jax and Tara have a quick wedding ceremony. Nero begins to develop an alliance with Jax and a relationship with Gemma.
56	3	"Laying Pipe"	Adam Arkin	Kem Nunn & Liz Sagal & Kurt Sutter	September 25, 2012	5WAB03	3.80
As Jax, Chibs, Tig, and Opie struggle to stay alive during their jail time in County, Bobby learns from Luis that the cartel is looking to secure a backup plan. Gemma turns to an unlikely source as Tara continues to maneuver Thomas and Abel away from her. Meanwhile, Clay uses Nero's escort service to get a rise out of Gemma. Damon Pope gives Jax his terms and conditions, which could effectively change the entire dynamic of SAMCRO.
57	4	"Stolen Huffy"	Paris Barclay	Chris Collins	October 2, 2012	5WAB04	4.60
The police raids Nero's brothel, leaving Nero and Carla without an office space. Meanwhile, Jax and Chibs try to protect the escort the Biz Lats believe is responsible. Wendy tries to come to honest terms with Tara, while Gemma makes a move to get Tara back on her side. Jax sees an opportunity to pull the club in a new direction. Opie's wake is held, with all of SAMCRO in attendance.
58	5	"Orca Shrugged"	Gwyneth Horder-Payton	Regina Corrado & Kurt Sutter	October 9, 2012	5WAB05	4.34
The club votes on getting into the companion business with Nero. Meanwhile, Jax begins to build bridges by getting Jacob Hale's Charming Heights development back on track. The Gallindo/Irish Kings meeting finally happens. Gemma confronts her son over her relationship with Nero. Roosevelt's wife is accidentally shot when she is pushed to the floor during a home invasion. A transgender hooker does a favour for SAMCRO.
59	6	"Small World"	Adam Arkin	Roberto Patino	October 16, 2012	5WAB06	4.03
Damon Pope gives Jax an offer to mule more drugs, bringing the Niners, Lin's Triad, and the Mayans together in an uneasy pact. As Roosevelt waits for the DNA under Rita's fingernails to be identified, he swears revenge on SAMCRO if they are found guilty. Gemma is forced to ask for Clay's help after Carla ends her relationship with Nero in a bloody manner. Jax learns the identity of the County Jail officer who led Opie to his death. Unser comes to a realization about his relationship with Gemma. Tara tries to convince Otto to reverse his testimony against the club. Clay endures another setback.
60	7	"Toad's Wild Ride"	Peter Weller	Kurt Sutter & Chris Collins	October 23, 2012	5WAB07	4.30
As Jax and the club begin to connect the dots on the series of home invasions, the Nomads scramble to get out of Charming before they are found out. Meanwhile, Jax is forced to clean up one of his mother's messes. Clay uses Juice and Unser to tie up some loose ends. Jax's trust in Pope is further strained when two black gang members attack him and Chibs. Tara gives Gemma one more chance to be in her children's lives, which ends in tragedy when Gemma has a car accident while driving with the children.
61	8	"Ablation"	Karen Gaviola	Mike Daniels	October 30, 2012	5WAB08	4.58
In the aftermath of Gemma's car accident, Clay and Nero have different approaches to helping her out of trouble with Jax and Tara: Clay lies to Jax about the accident, while Nero advises Gemma to tell the truth. The Sons try to find out who was behind the attack on Jax and Chibs. They find Frankie, who confesses Clay was behind it, but he escapes at gunpoint with Nero's money. Nero gets Jax's permission to get back together with Gemma. Clay pressures Juice, who finally fills him in on all the secrets he's been hiding from the club. In return, Clay tells him about his involvement with the Nomad's attacks. Jax discovers Gemma was under the influence of pot while driving, and Tara banishes her after striking her. Meanwhile, Roosevelt promises to tell Jax the name of the rat who has been informing on them for the RICO case, in exchange for Frankie Diamonds. Jax devises a plan to trap Clay, which includes manipulating Gemma, who's Clay's weakness, and Jax tells Gemma if she wants back in the family's good graces, she has to get close to Clay and learn his dirty secrets.
62	9	"Andare Pescare"	Billy Gierhart	Liz Sagal & Kurt Sutter	November 6, 2012	5WAB09	3.96
Jax and the club go on the hunt for Frankie Diamonds, while Clay and Juice follow up on their own lead in a race to get to him first. Clay and Juice discover Frankie has sought the protection of his old Mafia allies. The club votes on Frankie's expulsion and execution, but Jax tells Bobby they can't kill Frankie and explains the deal with Roosevelt. During the trip to find Frankie, Clay manipulates Juice into going after Frankie on their own. Nero takes Gemma to meet his disabled son. Clay and Juice find Frankie first, but Jax arrives before Clay can kill him. However, the Mafia kills Frankie when they see he killed the Mafioso assigned to guard him. Gemma and Nero share a tender moment as he buries his half-sister Carla. Tara gets more than she bargained for when she makes a second attempt to get Otto to recant his RICO statement. After obtaining Tara's reassurances about Jax's offer, Gemma takes the first step toward getting close to Clay. Jax shows Roosevelt Frankie's corpse, and in exchange he gets confirmation about the Son who talked to the police. The episode ends with Jax following Juice.
63	10	"Crucifixed"	Guy Ferland	Kem Nunn	November 13, 2012	5WAB10	4.58
After confronting Juice about his betrayal of the club, Jax offers him a path to redemption. Avenging Opie's death proves difficult when one of the perpetrators turns up under the protection of the Grim Bastards, leading to a disagreement between Jax and Bobby. As Gemma attempts to get closer to Clay, Tara performs one last favour for Otto—with bloody results.
64	11	"To Thine Own Self"	Paris Barclay	Mike Daniels & John Barcheski & Kurt Sutter	November 20, 2012	5WAB11	4.23
Jax scrambles to put his affairs in order, while Nero handles business with his old crew.
65	12	"Darthy"	Peter Weller	Chris Collins & Kurt Sutter	November 27, 2012	5WAB12	4.25
Jax makes arrangements to take the club in a different direction. The Irish kidnap Wendy, and Nero gives Jax the $450,000 required to get her back. Jax shoots up Wendy with a speedball, in an attempt to stop her from pursuing custody of Abel.
66	13	"J'ai Obtenu Cette"	Kurt Sutter	Kurt Sutter & Chris Collins	December 4, 2012	5WAB13	4.66
Clay and Juice are packing Clay's house in preparation for Clay’s move to Ireland. Jax strikes a new deal while ridding himself of old problems. Jax and Tig kill Pope and frame Clay for the murder with the help of Juice and Gemma. After killing Pope, Jax keeps his dealings going with Pope's second in command, August Marks. Bobby figures out what Jax has done and confronts him, then later on leaves his V.P. patch on the table. Tara is arrested for conspiracy to commit murder. Gemma arrives at Jax's house to console Jax.

== Reception ==
Season five received favourable reviews and has a rating of 72 on the review aggregator site Metacritic. Review aggregator website Rotten Tomatoes has an approval rating of 83% based on 23 reviews. The site's critical consensus reads: "Still dangerous and proud of it, Sons of Anarchy builds upon its ferocious attitude with impressive finesse." Ken Tucker of Entertainment Weekly praised the series by calling it a "richly detailed portrait of self-righteous villainy".

== Home media release ==
The fifth season was released in the United States on DVD and Blu-ray on August 27, 2013.
