= Desert Noises =

American indie rock band

Desert Noises are an American indie rock band from the Provo, Utah area.

== History ==
Desert Noises was formed in 2009 by brothers Kyle and Trevor Henderson in Provo, Utah, the third largest city in the state. They released two EPs under Northplatte Records before a change of the lineup in 2011.

With newly solidified lineup of Tyler Osmond, Patrick Boyer and Brennan Allen, Desert Noises began touring extensively playing notable music festivals such as Austin City Limits Music Festival and LouFest as well as releasing another EP in 2012. In 2013 the band signed with the SQE Music label to record their Debut LP 27 Ways. which was released on March 25, 2014 and produced by Nic Jodoin.

The band's influences, according to their website, include "beat-oriented soul and R&B as well as classic psychedelic rock".

On May 7, 2015, the band announced on its Facebook page its decision to move from Provo to Nashville, Tennessee.

== Members ==
=== Current ===
- Kyle Henderson- Lead Vocals/Guitar
- Tyler Osmond- Bass/Vocals
- Patrick Boyer- Lead Guitar
- Brennan Allen- Drums

== Discography ==
=== Albums ===
- Mountain Sea (2011)
- 27 Ways (2014)
- Everything Always (2020)

=== EPs ===
- Desert Noises (2009)
