= Northplatte Records =

- Founded: 2006
- Founder: Joshua James; McKay Stevens
- Country of origin: U.S.
- Location: American Fork, Utah
- Official website: www.northplatterecords.com

Northplatte Records is an American independent record label founded by singer-songwriter Joshua James and McKay Stevens.

== Fork Fest ==
In October 2010, Northplatte Records sponsored Fork Fest, a music festival featuring 33 artists on 3 stages. Attendance was approximately 5,000. The one-day festival was advertised on radio and via virtually all local print media. Artists included all Northplatte artists as well as artists signed to Kilby Records, Slowtrain Records, Columbia Records, Red Owl Records (Fictionist), Sea Sick Records, My Forlorn Wallet Records, Thousand Leaves Records, Call Me Judy Records, Groundloop Records, R Legacy Entertainment, Sonata Cantata Records, and widely known unsigned acts including Imagine Dragons and Location Location.

== Roster ==
- Desert Noises
- Joshua James
- NightNight
- Sayde Price
- RURU
- Timmy the Teeth
- The Vibrant Sound

Former

- William James & The Underground Railroad
- Parlor Hawk
- Isaac Russell
- Southern War
- Brando White
- Willamette Mountain

== Discography ==
Northplatte Records released its first album (B-Sides It's Dark Outside, NPR001) in 2006. Each item in the list includes the artist, the release name, the release medium or media, and (in most cases) the release date.

- NPR–001: Joshua James – B-Sides It's Dark Outside – CD/LP (2006)
- NPR–002: RuRu (AKA Isaac Russell) – Elizabeth – CD/LP (2008)
- NPR–003: Southern War – Southern War EP – CD/EP (2006)
- NPR–004: Joshua James – Fields & Floods – CD/LP (2007)
- NPR–005: Joshua James – The Sun is Always Brighter – CD/LP (2007)
- NPR–006: Joshua James – Crash This Train / The Garden EP – CD/EP (2008)
- NPR–007: Desert Noises – Desert Noises EP – CD/EP (2009)
- NPR–008: William James & The Underground Railroad – CD/LP (2009)
- NPR–009: The Vibrant Sound – Downtown – CD/LP (2009)
- NPR–010: Joshua James – Sing Songs EP – CD/EP (2009)
- NPR–011: Joshua James – Build Me This – CD/LP (2009)
- NPR–012: Various – Northplatte Records Christmas Album – CD/EP (2009)
- NPR–013: Parlor Hawk – Hoarse & Roaring – CD/LP (2010)
- NPR–014: Joshua James – Joshua James iTunes Sessions – mp3 (2010)
- NPR–015: Joshua James – My Sisters Words – CD/EP (2010)
- NPR–016: Various – Fork Fest 2010 Compilation Album – CD/EP (2010)
- NPR–017: Sayde Price – Wilt All Rosy – CD/LP (2011)
- NPR–018: Joshua James – From the Top of Willamette Mountain – CD/LP (2012)
- NPR–014: Desert Noises – 27 Ways – CD/LP (2014)
