= No Apologies =

No Apologies may refer to:

== Film and television ==
- No Apologies, a 2012 documentary film by Ashley Morrison
- "No Apologies" (Reacher), a 2022 TV episode

== Music ==
=== Albums ===
- No Apologies (The Eyeliners album) or the title song, 2005
- No Apologies (Trapt album) or the title song, 2010
- No Apologies, by the Right Brothers, 2006
- No Apologies: The Chung King Sessions, by Judge, 1992

=== Songs ===
- "No Apologies" (Alanis Morissette song), 1993
- "No Apologies" (Consequence and Kanye West song), 2024
- "No Apologies" (Eminem song), 2006
- "No Apologies" (JoJo song) or "Fuck Apologies", 2016
- "No Apologies" (Papa Roach song), 2022
- "No Apologies", by Bon Jovi from Greatest Hits, 2010
- "No Apologies", by Joni Mitchell from Taming the Tiger, 1998
- "No Apologies", by Kitt Wakeley featuring Starr Parodi from An Adoption Story, 2022
- "No Apologies", by Sum 41 from Underclass Hero, 2007

=== Music video ===
- No Apologies, a 2005 performance video by Bleed the Dream

== See also ==
- No Apology, a 2010 book by Mitt Romney
- Non-apology apology, an inauthentic apology
