= Sorry Sorry =

Sorry, Sorry may refer to:

- Sorry, Sorry (album), a 2009 album by Super Junior
  - "Sorry, Sorry" (Super Junior song), from the 2009 album Sorry, Sorry
- "Sorry, Sorry" (Femi Kuti song), from the 1998 album Shoki Shoki
- "Sorry Sorry" (Vanessa Mai song), from the 2025 album Traumfabrik
- "Sorry Sorry", a song by Fareedh from the 2008 film Aatadista
- "Sorry Sorry", a 1997 single by Idha
- "Sorry Sorry", a song by Rooney from the 2003 album Rooney
- "Sorry Sorry", a song by Sachin–Jigar from the 2013 film ABCD: Any Body Can Dance
- "Sorry Sorry", a 1998 song by Sujatha Mohan from the film Bavagaru Bagunnara?
- "Sorry Sorry", a single by Those French Girls, S. Kelly, N. Innes, Safari Records 1982
- "Sorry Sorry", a song by Tippu and Nanditha from the 2003 film Excuse Me

== See also ==
- "Sorry, Sorry, Sorry", a 1958 single by Alma Cogan
- "Sorry Sorry Sarah", a song from the 2008 album Liferz by the band Blood on the Wall
