= I'm Sorry =

I'm Sorry may refer to:

== Film, TV and games ==
- I Am Sorry, a 2012 Nepali film
- I'm Sorry (TV series) starring Andrea Savage on TruTV
- I'm Sorry (video game), a 1985 arcade game

== Music ==
- I'm Sorry..., 2012 EP by The Neighbourhood

=== Songs ===
- "I'm Sorry" (Brenda Lee song), 1960
- "I'm Sorry" (Delfonics song), 1968
- "I'm Sorry" (John Denver song), 1975
- "I'm Sorry" (Joyner Lucas song), 2016
- "I'm Sorry" (The Platters song), 1957
- "So. Central Rain (I'm Sorry)", a 1984 song by R.E.M.
- "Nick Clegg Says I'm Sorry (The Autotune Remix)", a song featuring Nick Clegg, made by The Poke
- "I'm Sorry", by Benny Benassi from Hypnotica
- "I'm Sorry", by Blink-182 from Dude Ranch
- "I'm Sorry", by Bo Diddley from Go Bo Diddley
- "I'm Sorry", by Brokencyde from I'm Not a Fan, But the Kids Like It!
- "I'm Sorry", by Dannii Minogue from Club Disco
- "I'm Sorry", by Demi Lovato from Dancing with the Devil... the Art of Starting Over
- "I'm Sorry", by Evergrey from Recreation Day
- "I'm Sorry", by Hall & Oates from Whole Oats
- "I'm Sorry", by Hothouse Flowers from People
- "I'm Sorry", by Just a Man
- "I'm Sorry", by the Partysquad, originally by Monsta Boy titled "Sorry (I Didn't Know)"
- "I'm Sorry", by Roxette from Crash! Boom! Bang!
- "I'm Sorry", by Shaggy from Shaggy & Friends
- "I'm Sorry", by The Word Alive
- "I'm Sorry", by Vixen from Live & Learn

== See also ==
- Condolences
- Congratulations… I'm Sorry, an album by Gin Blossoms
- "Hard to Say I'm Sorry", a 1982 song by Chicago
- I Am Sorry Mathe Banni Preethsona, 2011 Indian Telugu-language film
- Regret (emotion)
- Sorry (disambiguation)
- Thank You, I'm Sorry (disambiguation)
