= & (The Moth & The Flame EP) =

& EP

EP by The Moth & The Flame
- Released: November 5, 2013
- Genre: Art rock, Alternative rock
- Label: Hidden Records
- Producer: Joey Waronker

The Moth & The Flame chronology
The Moth & The Flame (2011)	& EP (2013)

Professional ratings
Review scores
Source	Rating
Daily Herald	(very favorable)
Salt Lake City Weekly	(very favorable)
The Guardian	(very favorable)
Violent Success	9.5/10
Bring The Noise UK	8/10

& (stylized with the character ⅋; sometimes written Ampersand) is an EP and the debut major-label recording by rock group The Moth & The Flame, released digitally on November 5, 2013, internationally. It was produced by drummer/producer Joey Waronker (Beck, Atoms for Peace, R.E.M.) and mixed by Peter Katis (The National, Interpol). All songs were written by The Moth & The Flame. To promote the EP, the group toured Europe supporting Imagine Dragons during the fall and winter of 2013.

== Radio ==
"Sorry" received airtime on BBC Radio 1, Xfm, KROQ, KCRW, and other taste-making stations. It reached #1 on the KROQ Locals Only Playlist. "Sorry" featured as BBC Radio 1's Zane Lowe's "Next Hype".

== Music video ==
The "Sorry" music video premiered on mtvU on Friday, November 22, 2013. It features actor Kirby Heyborne and depicts a family of mannequins facing an atomic bomb detonation.

== Media use ==
Track "How We Woke Up" appears in Skinwalker Ranch (2013). Track "Sorry" featured on NFL on CBS in November 2013.

== Track listing ==
No.	Title	Writer(s)	Producer(s)	Length
1.	"Sorry"	The Moth & the Flame	Joey Waronker	3:30
2.	"Winsome"	The Moth & the Flame	Joey Waronker	3:56
3.	"Silver Tongue"	The Moth & the Flame	Joey Waronker	3:51
4.	"Monster"	The Moth & the Flame	Joey Waronker	3:51
5.	"Holy War"	The Moth & the Flame	Joey Waronker	2:16
6.	"How We Woke Up"	The Moth & the Flame	Joey Waronker	4:42

== Release history ==
Region	Date	Format	Label
Worldwide	November 5, 2013	Digital download	Hidden Records
