= I Apologize =

I Apologize may refer to:

- I Apologize (album), an album by Ginuwine, or the title song
- "I Apologize" (1931 song), a 1931 song written by Al Hoffman, Al Goodhart and Ed Nelson
- "I Apologize" (Anita Baker song)
- "I Apologize", a song by Lionel Richie from Coming Home
- "I Apologize", a song by Hüsker Dü from New Day Rising
- "I Apologize", a song by Five Finger Death Punch from the Deluxe edition of Got Your Six

== See also ==
- "Apologize", a 2005 song by OneRepublic
