= Sons of Anarchy season 6 =

Sons of Anarchy
- Season 6
- Region 1 DVD cover art
- Starring: Charlie Hunnam; Katey Sagal; Mark Boone Junior; Dayton Callie; Kim Coates; Tommy Flanagan; Theo Rossi; Maggie Siff; Ron Perlman; Jimmy Smits
- No. of episodes: 13

Release
- Original network: FX
- Original release: September 10 – December 10, 2013

Season chronology
- ← Previous; Season 5 Next → Season 7

The sixth and penultimate season of the American television drama series Sons of Anarchy premiered on September 10, 2013, and concluded on December 10, 2013, after 13 episodes aired on cable network FX. Created by Kurt Sutter, it is about the lives of a close-knit outlaw motorcycle club operating in Charming, a fictional town in California's Central Valley. The show centers on protagonist Jackson "Jax" Teller (Charlie Hunnam), the president of the club, who begins questioning the club and himself.

The season finale was the second-most watched episode of the season and the most-watched finale in the series history.

Sons of Anarchy is the story of the Teller-Morrow family of Charming, California, as well as other members of the Sons of Anarchy Motorcycle Club, Redwood Original (SAMCRO), their families, various Charming townspeople, allied and rival gangs, associates, and law agencies that undermine or support SAMCRO's legal and illegal enterprises.

== Plot ==
Following the arrest of Tara and Clay, Jax struggles to hold SAMCRO together while Tara is imprisoned. Toric approaches both Tara and Clay and offers them deals in exchange for giving up SAMCRO; both initially refuse, but Clay later relents when confronted with being thrown into the prison's general population and assuredly being killed by inmates paid off by Damon Pope's men as a retaliation for Pope's murder. Juice returns to Charming after helping Bobby relocate after stepping down as VP, which angers Chibs, who doesn't believe Juice has been punished enough for talking to cops and later beats him.

== Cast and characters ==
Sons of Anarchy is the story of the Teller-Morrow family of Charming, California, as well as the other members of Sons of Anarchy Motorcycle Club, Redwood Original (SAMCRO), their families, various Charming townspeople, allied and rival gangs, associates, and law agencies that undermine or support SAMCRO's legal and illegal enterprises.

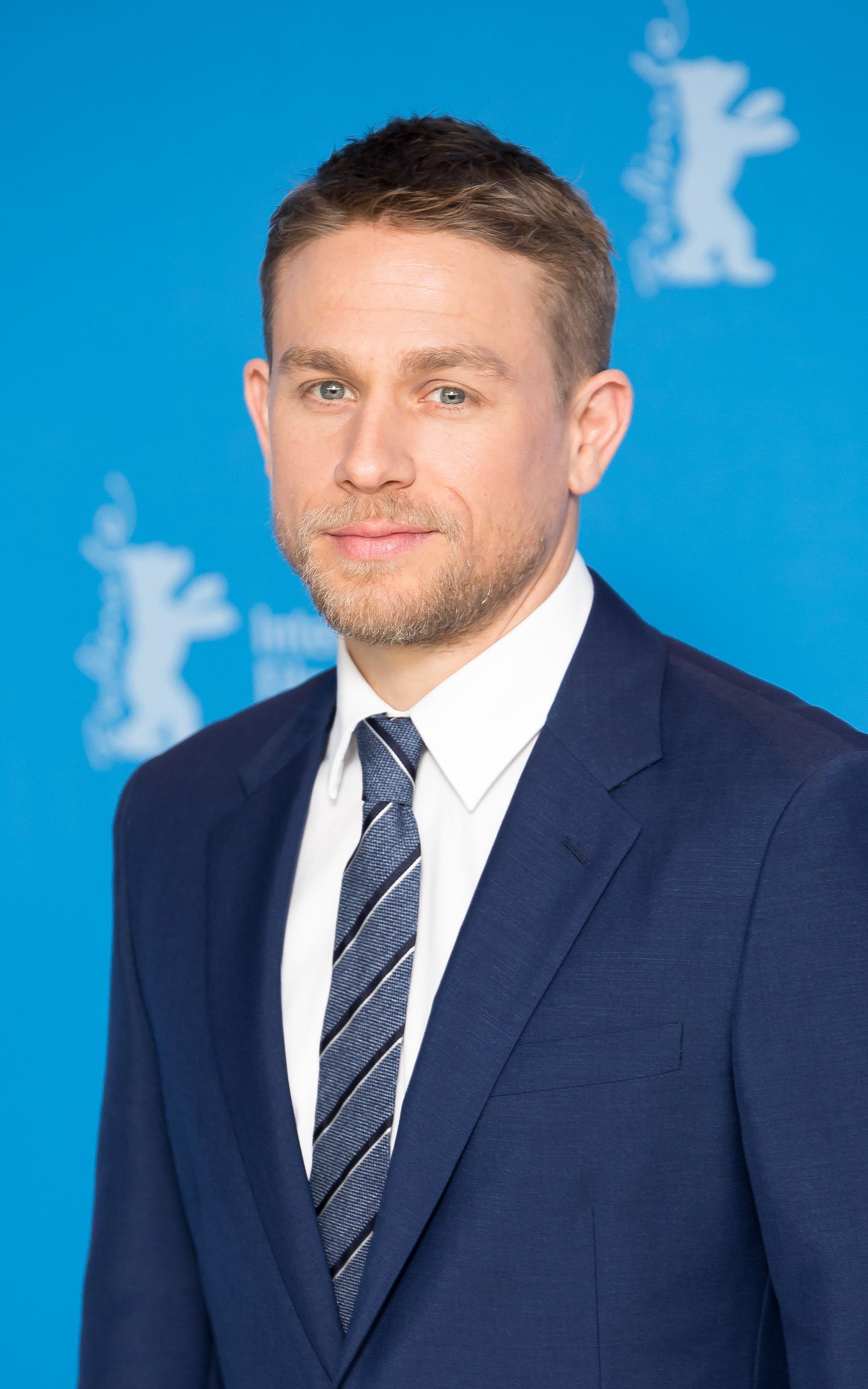
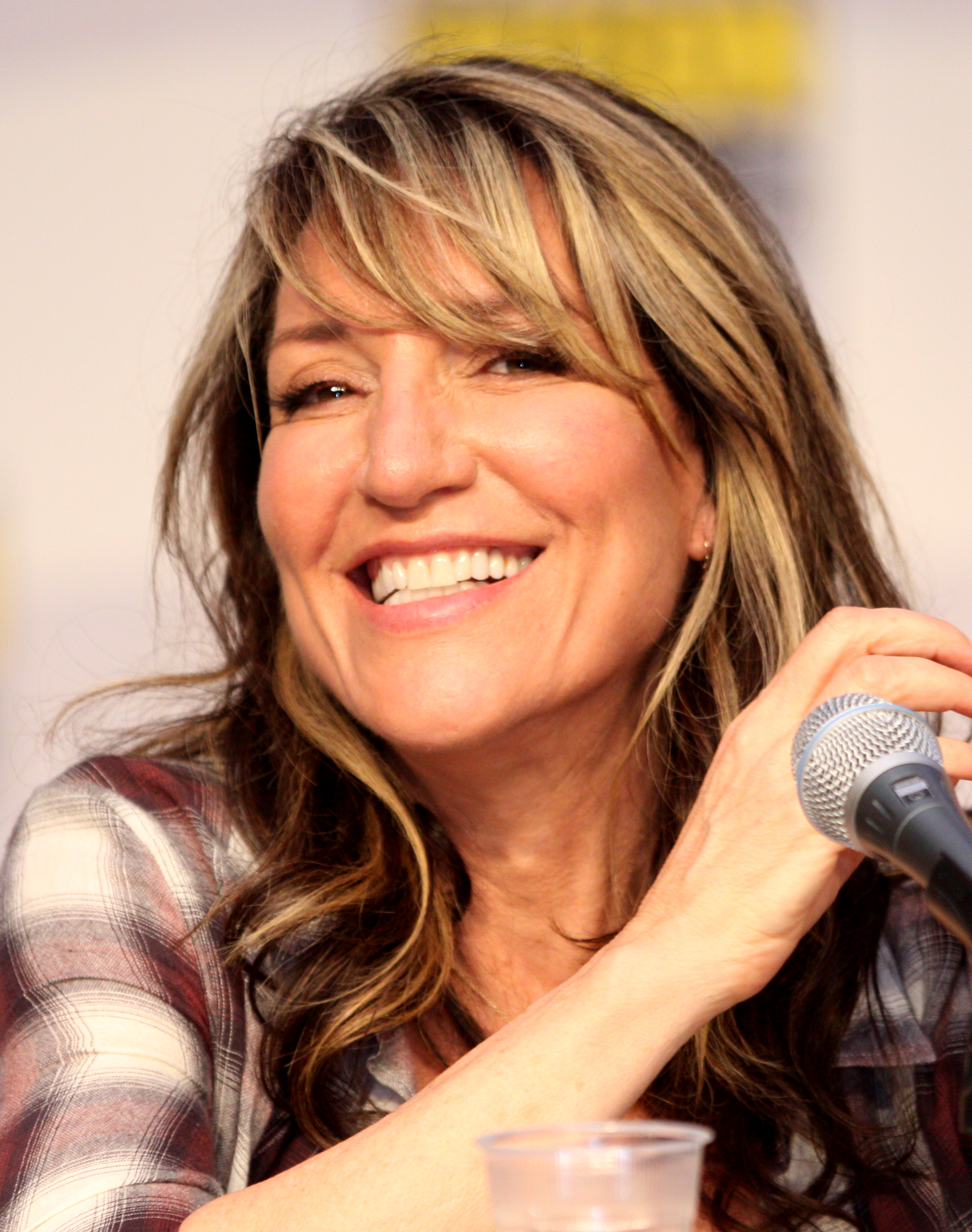
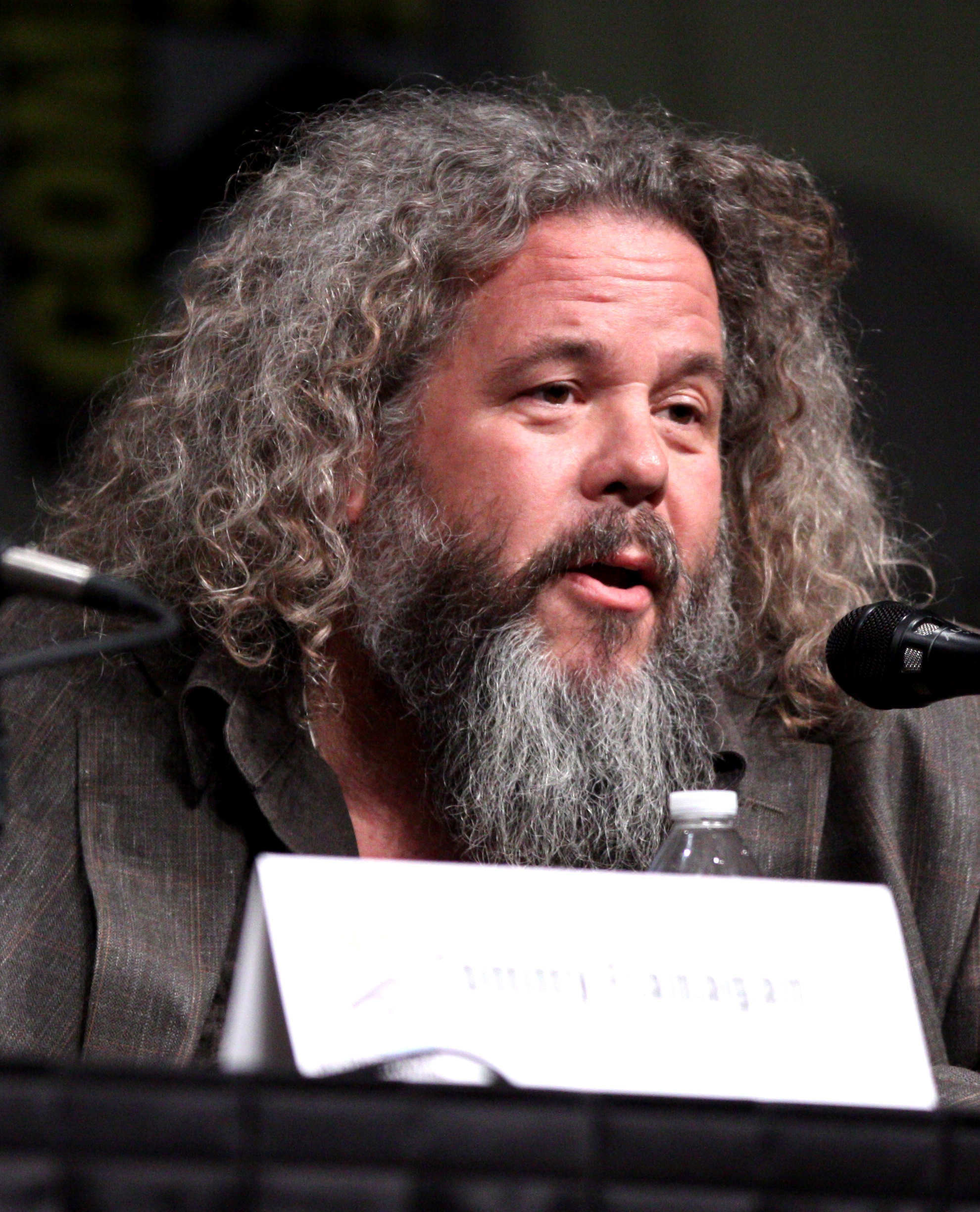
Charlie Hunnam (Jax Teller), Katey Sagal (Gemma Teller Morrow), and Mark Boone Junior (Bobby Munson)
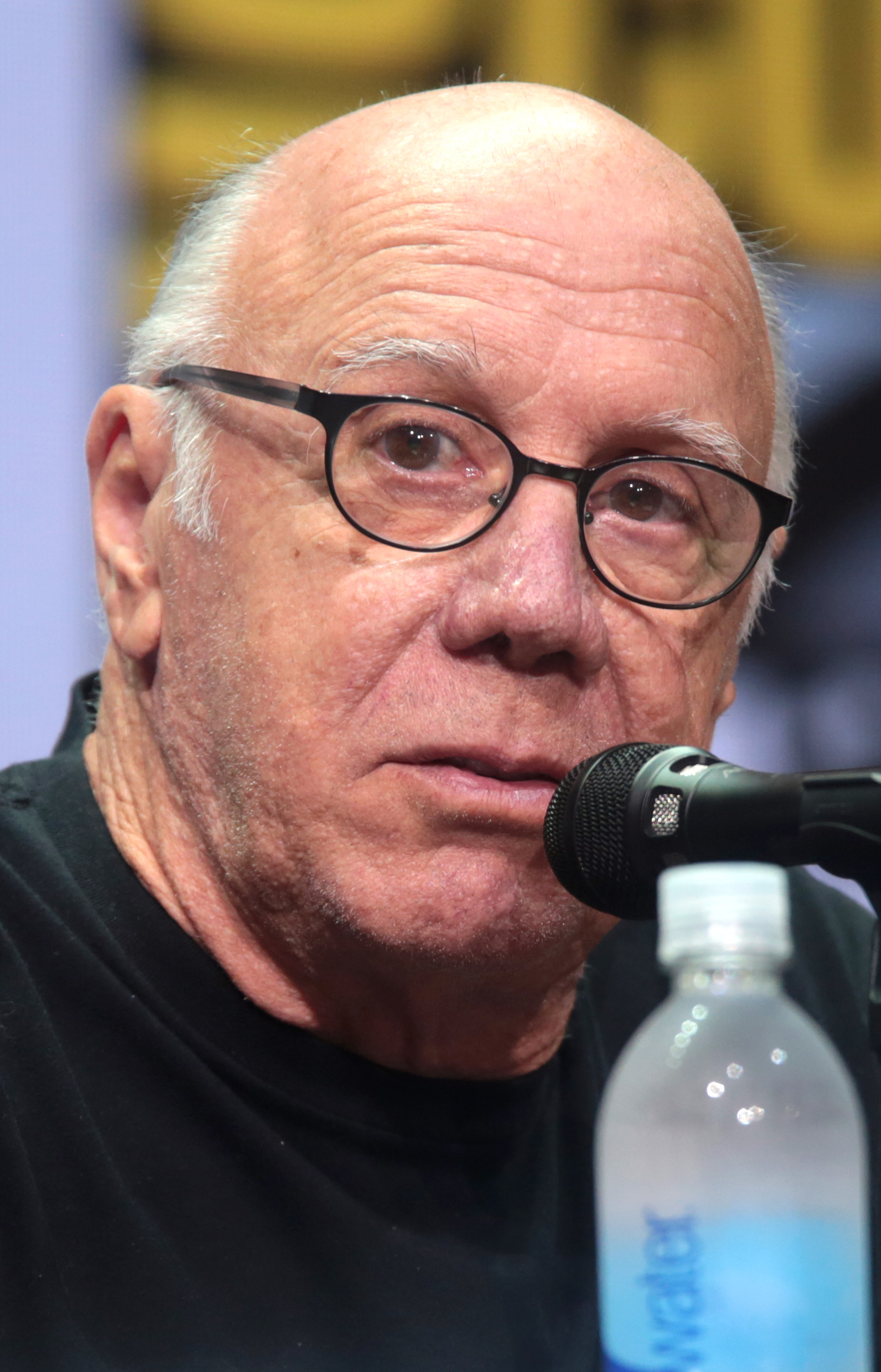
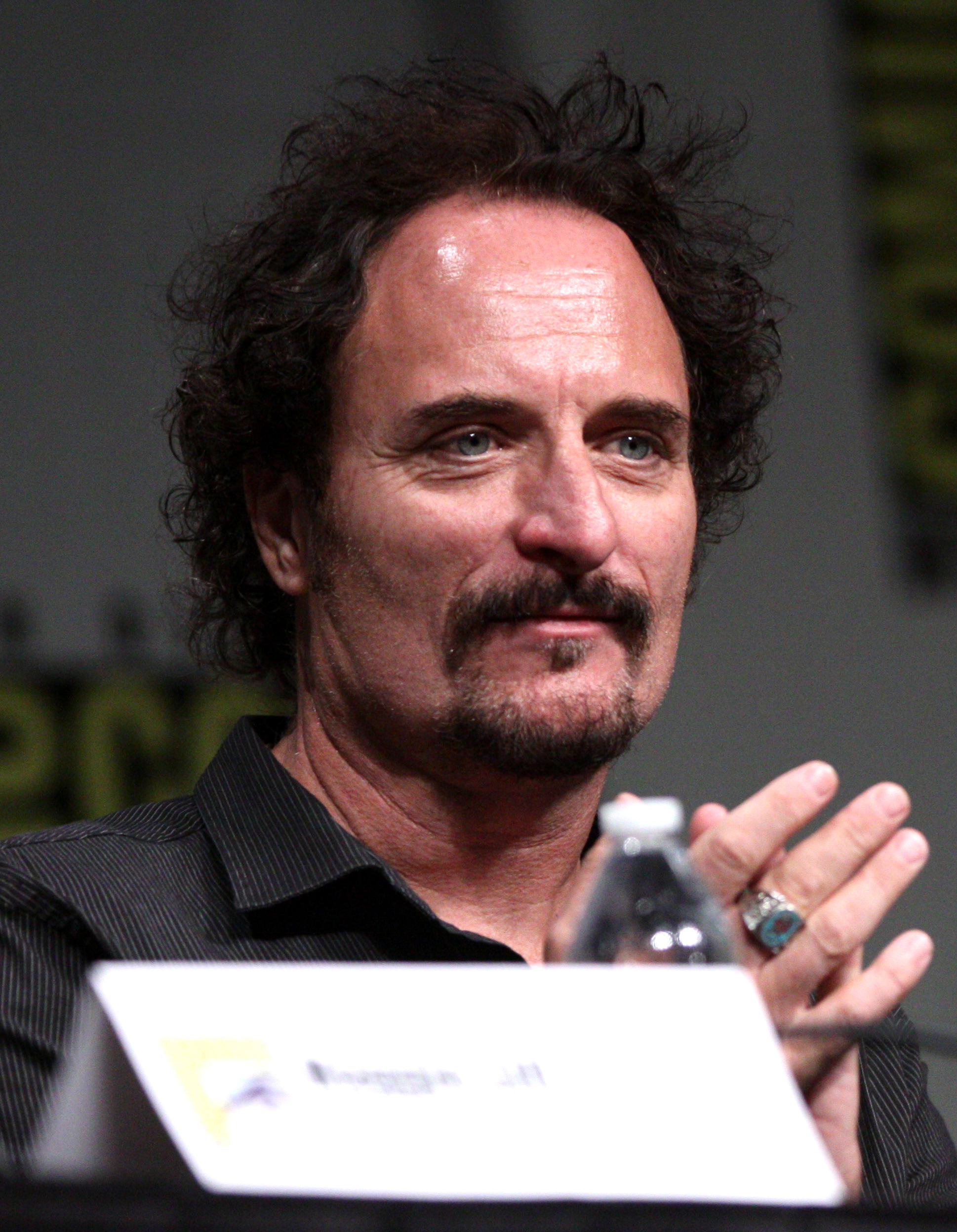
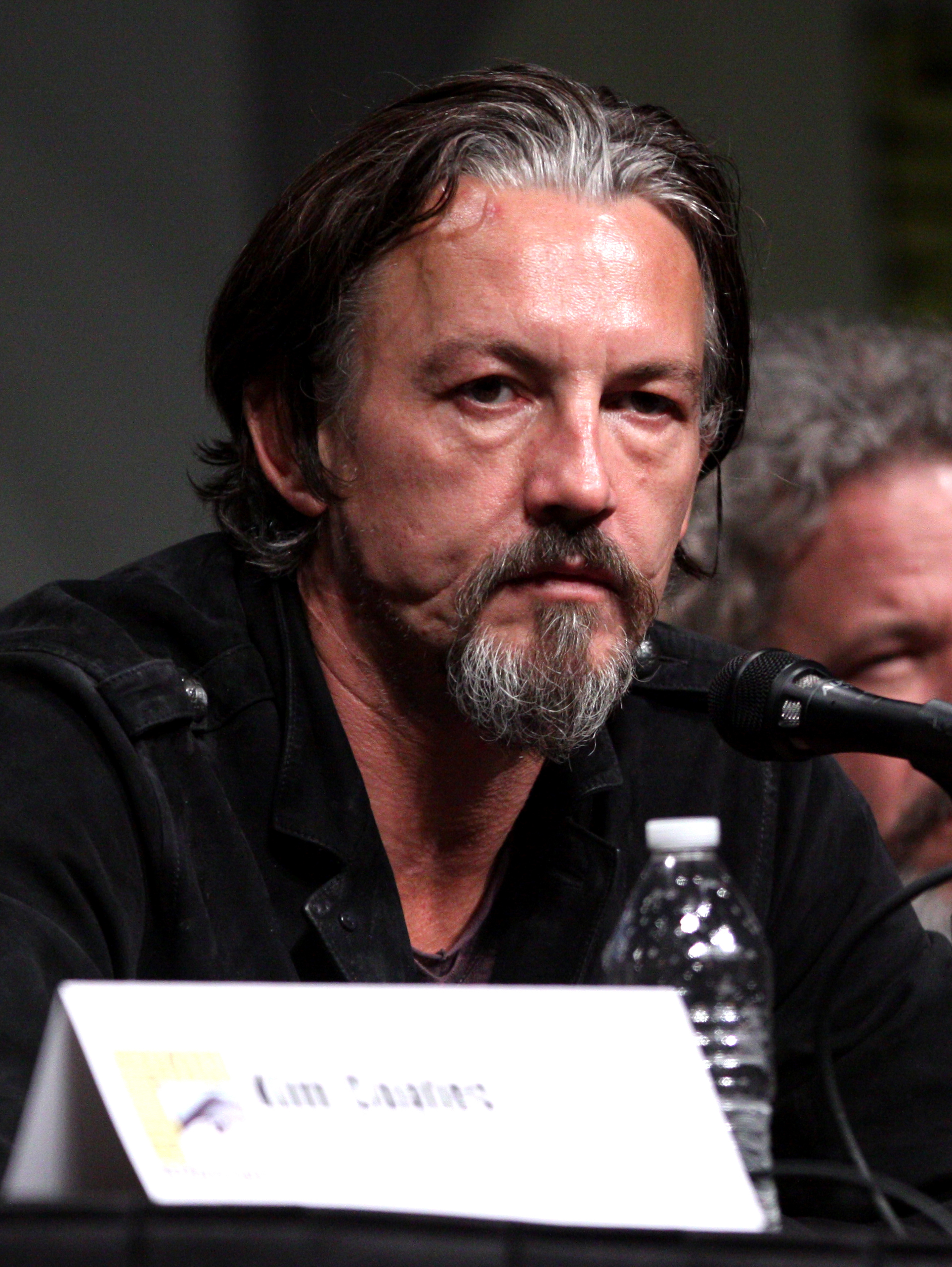
Dayton Callie (Wayne Unser), Kim Coates (Tig Trager) and Tommy Flanagan (Chibs Telford)
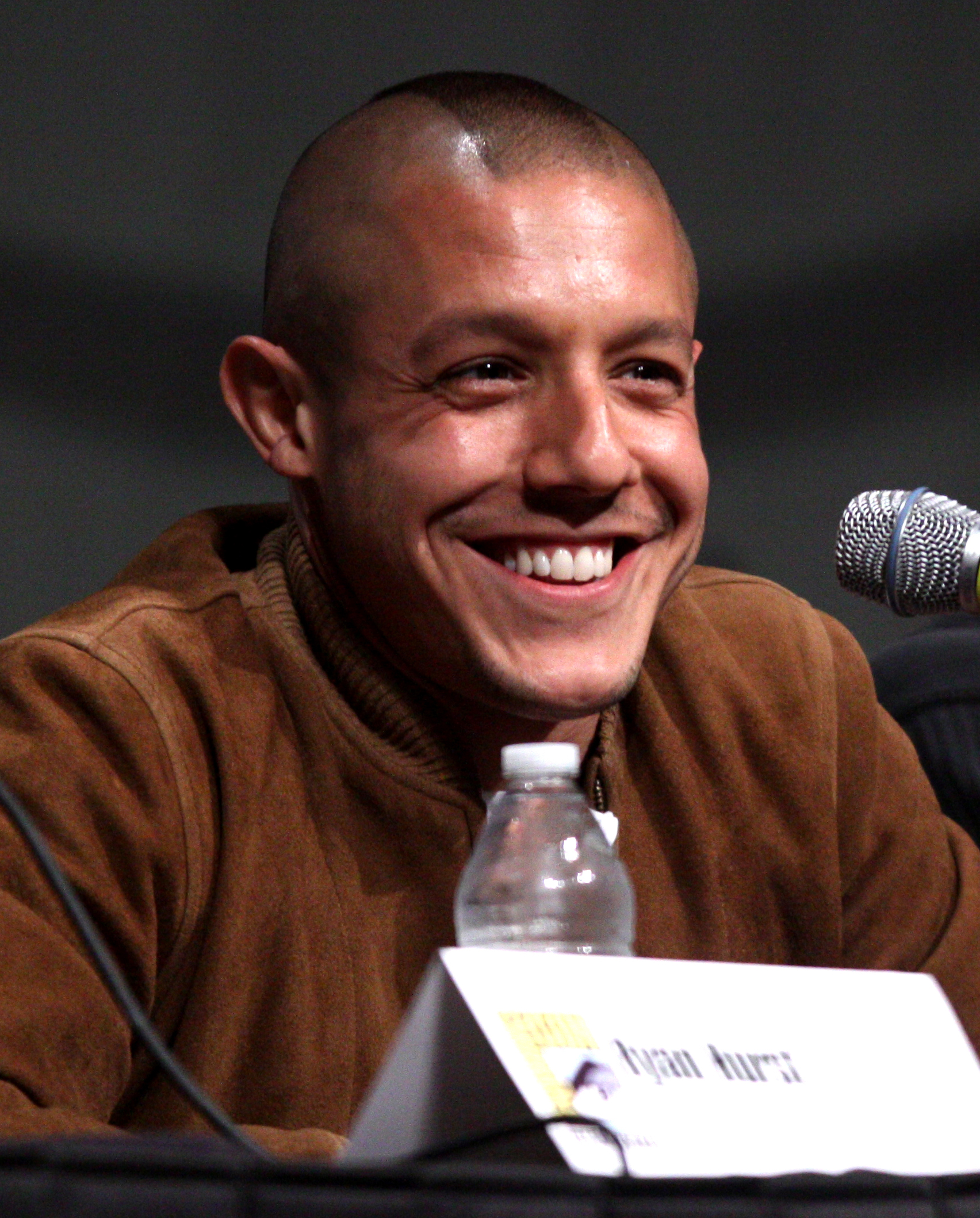
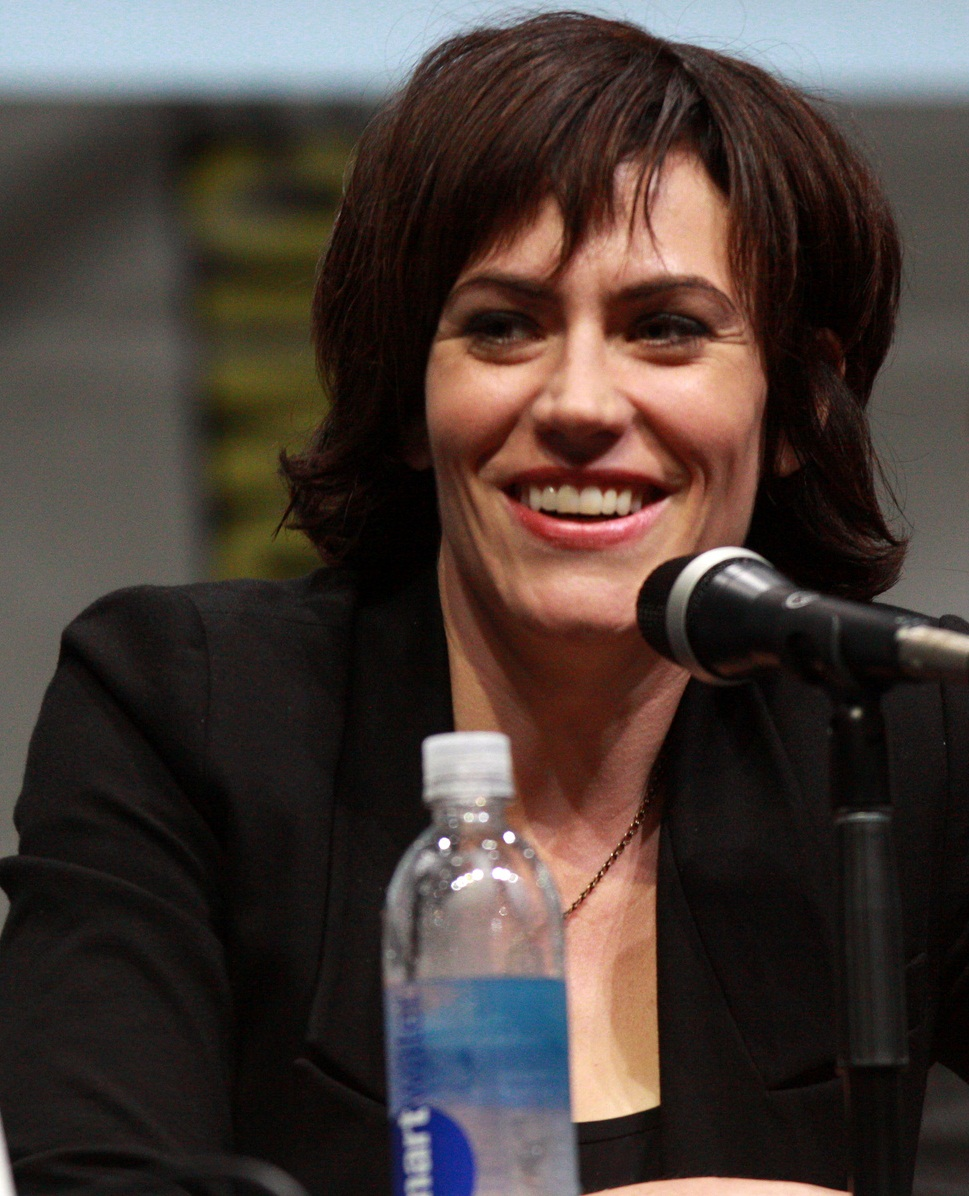
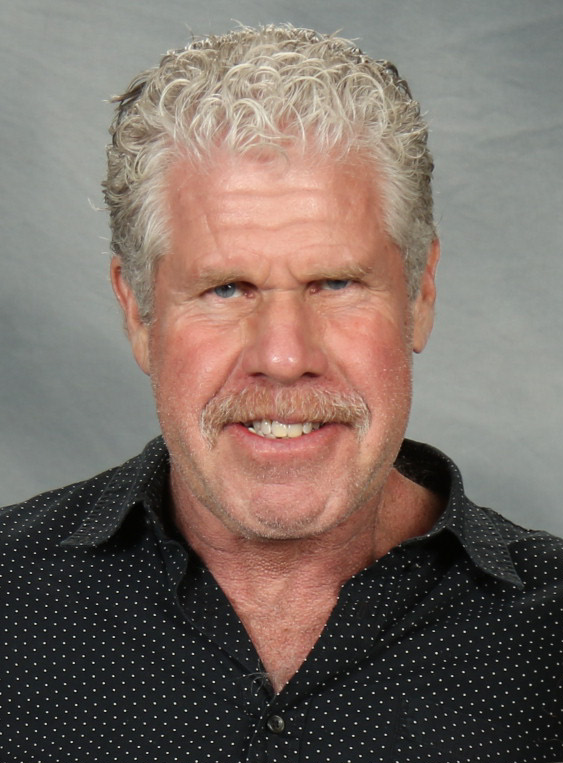
Theo Rossi (Juice Ortiz), Maggie Siff (Tara Knowles), and Ron Perlman (Clay Morrow)
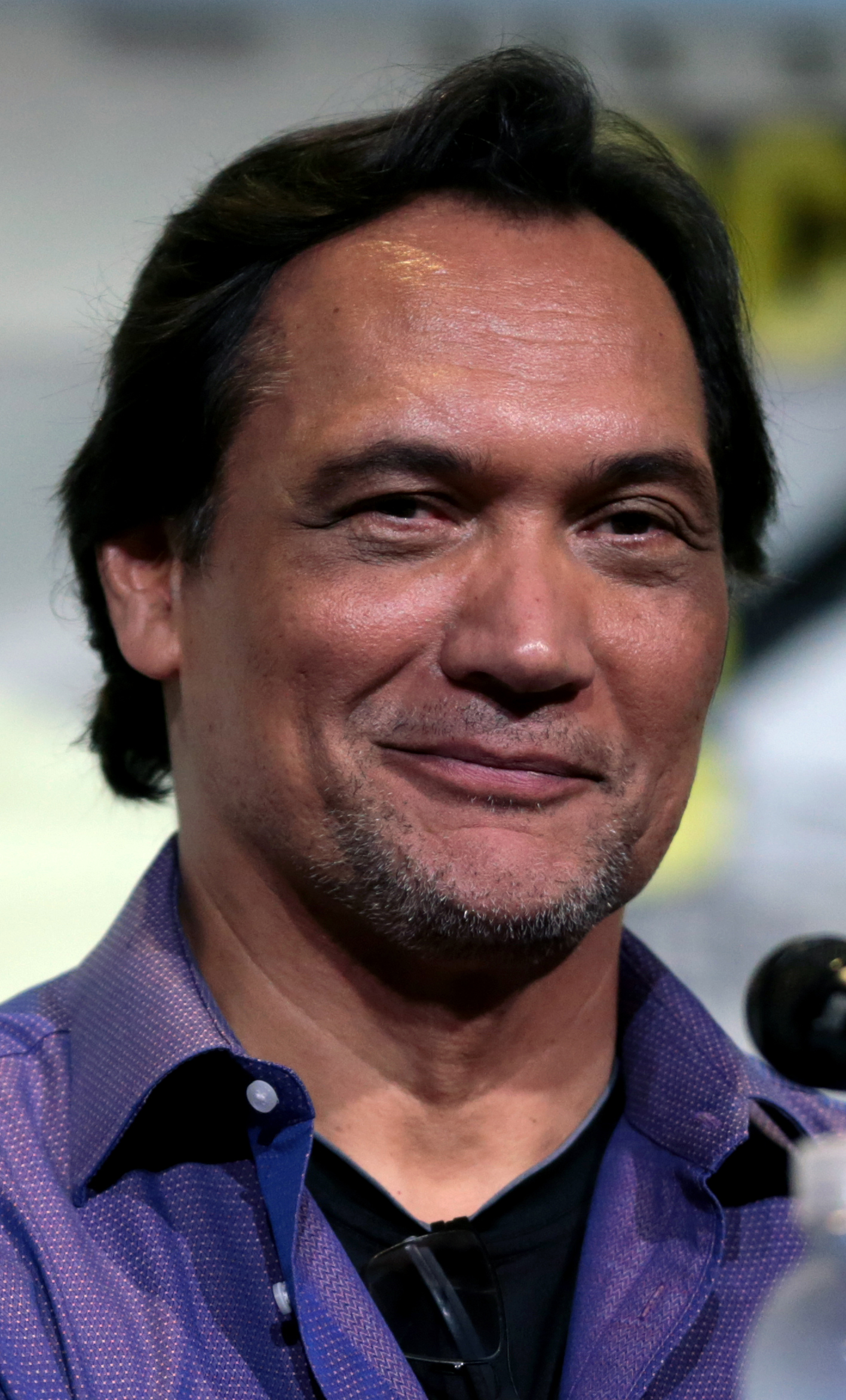
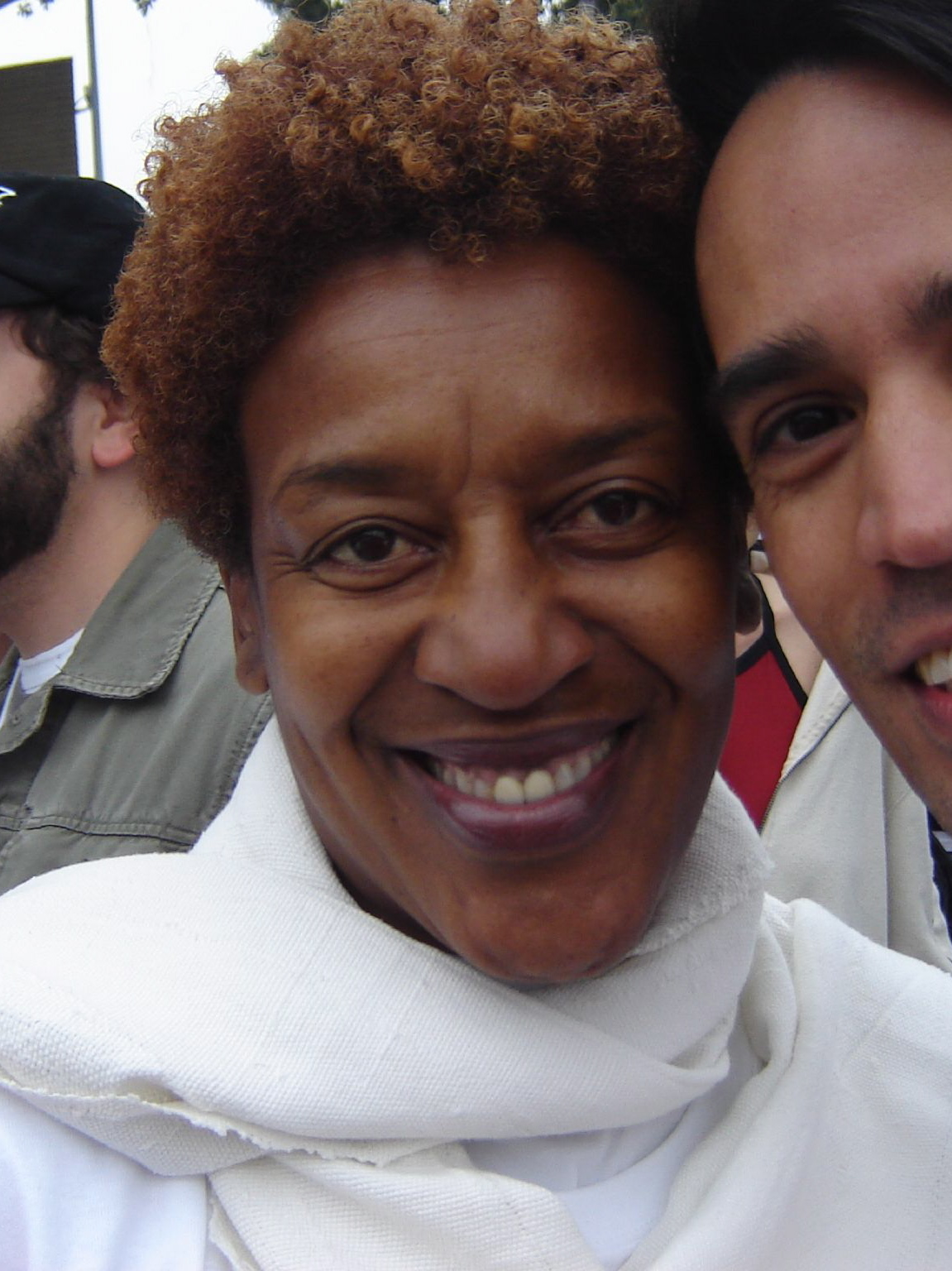
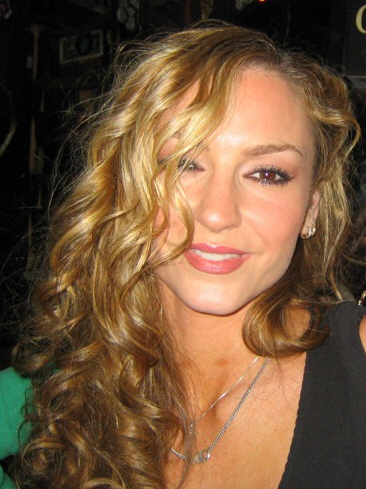
Jimmy Smits (Nero Padilla), CCH Pounder (Tyne Patterson) and Drea de Matteo (Wendy Case)

=== Main cast ===
- Charlie Hunnam as Jackson "Jax" Teller
- Katey Sagal as Gemma Teller Morrow
- Mark Boone Junior as Robert "Bobby Elvis" Munson
- Dayton Callie as Wayne Unser
- Kim Coates as Alex "Tig" Trager
- Tommy Flanagan as Filip "Chibs" Telford
- Theo Rossi as Juan-Carlos "Juice" Ortiz
- Maggie Siff as Tara Knowles-Teller
- Ron Perlman as Clarence "Clay" Morrow
- Jimmy Smits as Nero Padilla

=== Special guest cast ===
- CCH Pounder as Tyne Patterson
- Drea de Matteo as Wendy Case
- Rockmond Dunbar as Lieutenant Eli Roosevelt
- Peter Weller as Charles Barosky
- Donal Logue as Lee Toric
- Walton Goggins as Venus Van Dam
- Mitch Pileggi as Ernest Darby
- Robert Patrick as Les Packer

=== Recurring cast ===
- David LaBrava as Happy Lowman
- Niko Nicotera as George "Ratboy" Skogstrom
- Michael Marisi Ornstein as Chuck Marstein
- Robin Weigert as Ally Lowen
- LaMonicca Garret as Sgt. Cane
- Timothy V. Murphy as Gallen O'Shay
- Reynaldo Gallegos as Fiasco
- Kim Dickens as Collette Jane
- Billy Brown as August Marks
- Douglas Bennett as Orlin West
- Rusty Coones as Rane Quinn
- McNally Sagal as Margaret Murphy
- Winter Ave Zoli as Lyla Winston
- Jacob Vargas as Alessandro Montez
- Christopher Douglas Reed as Phillip "Filthy Phil" Russell
- Steve Howey as Hopper
- Kurt Sutter as "Big" Otto Delaney
- Bob McCracken as Brendan Roarke
- Kenneth Choi as Henry Lin
- Emilio Rivera as Marcus Alvarez
- Kristen Renton as Ima
- Walter Wong as Chris "V-Lin" Von Lin
- Jeff Kober as Jacob Hale, Jr.
- Alan O'Neill as Hugh

=== Guest stars ===
- Samaire Armstrong as Darvany Jennings
- Keone Young as Bohai Lin
- Hayley McFarland as Brooke Putner
- Olivia Burnette as Homeless Woman
- Mo McRae as Tyler Yost
- C. Thomas Howell as Frank Eagan
- Dave Navarro as Arcadio Nerona
- Doug Jones as Officer Crane
- Michael Shamus Wiles as Jury White
- Adrienne Barbeau as Alice Nona
- Patrick St. Esprit as Elliott Oswald

== Production ==
Although Sons of Anarchy is set in Northern California's Central Valley, it is filmed primarily at Occidental Studios Stage 5A in North Hollywood. Main sets located there include the clubhouse, St. Thomas Hospital and Jax's house. The production rooms at the studio used by the writing staff also double as the Charming police station. External scenes are often filmed nearby in Sun Valley and Tujunga.

== Episodes ==
No. overall	No. in season	Title	Directed by	Written by	Original release date	Prod. code	U.S. viewers (millions)
67	1	"Straw"	Paris Barclay	Kurt Sutter	September 10, 2013	6WAB01	5.87
While Tara is imprisoned, SAMCRO shifts members and titles, with Bobby leaving town. The club breaks up a violent porn ring run by Iranians at the docks in Stockton, striking up a partnership with ex-cop (Peter Weller), who enlists Jax to help a local madam (Kim Dickens) go legit. Pope's people still want Jax to surrender Tig to them. At a Catholic school, a violent shooting occurs with a weapon linked to the club's gunrunning business. The first episode of Anarchy Afterword aired live on FX.com on the same night and is now on Season 6 DVD as extra.
68	2	"One One Six"	Peter Weller	Chris Collins & Adria Lang	September 17, 2013	6WAB02	4.63
The school shooting was committed by someone connected to Nero's cousin, who had been given a number of KG-9's. Jax contacts the Irish, wishing to get out of the gun business, but the Irish are resistant to the idea. Toric offers Clay help with the murder charge, in exchange for information about SAMCRO. When Clay refuses, Toric forges Clay's signature on a plea agreement. Nero's cousin, and the latter's girlfriend - whose son shot up the school - are killed and buried. Elsewhere, Bobby has added another member to his list of recruits.
69	3	"Poenitentia"	Guy Ferland	Charles Murray & Kurt Sutter	September 24, 2013	6WAB03	4.48
Instead of killing Clay in jail, the black inmates instead tell Clay to commit a jail rec-yard stabbing. Jax and Barosky settle the score with the Iranians. Toric accidentally shoots a Diosa hooker he'd brought back to his motel room. Telling the corpse he'll make her death matter, he takes hair and blood samples to plant inside Nero's truck. Jax sends Tig back to the warehouse where they stored the equipment they stole from the Iranians. Tig waits there for the prospects Jax said he'd send to help move the equipment, but August, Pope's successor, shows up instead. Tara reveals to Jax that she is pregnant. The title, translated, means "Repentance".
70	4	"Wolfsangel"	Billy Gierhart	Kurt Sutter & Kem Nunn	October 1, 2013	6WAB04	4.59
Toric takes Clay to visit Otto; Clay slips Otto a shiv. Toric tells Otto he'll stop having Otto raped and beaten if Otto provides information that can be used against SAMCRO, then he gives Otto a pad to write down SAMCRO's sins. Otto writes an insulting remark about Toric's sister and then kills Toric. The guards then kill Otto. Galen, angry that Jax wants out of guns, goes to Oswald's lumber barn and shoots and dismembers SAMCRO member Phil and a SAMCRO prospect. Jax has the club exact revenge against the Nazis he believes attacked Unser, by killing them, planting the guns delivered by the Irish on the Nazis' rural property, and then burning down their house, making it look like an internal beef. Roosevelt orders Toric's personnel file, suspecting Toric is up to no good. The sheriff lets Nero go home, but Nero's truck remains impounded.
71	5	"The Mad King"	Gwyneth Horder-Payton	Chris Collins & Roberto Patino & Kurt Sutter	October 8, 2013	6WAB05	4.46
Tara secretly arranges with Lowen to have Wendy take custody of Thomas and Abel if Tara is convicted or otherwise indisposed, to keep them away from Gemma and the club's business. While the MC fails to capture Galen, they capture a few Irish but do not kill them. The IRA elders in Ireland don't like Jax's retaliation, but Jax tries to convince them that Galen is out of control and trying to profiteer for himself. Jax tells the IRA elders that August will be a solid customer for the arms shipments, despite being black. The SAMCRO clubhouse is on lock-down until Jax spots a shamrock pen. Jax realizes there's a bomb in the beer keg that was delivered earlier the same day. After everybody runs to safety, the SAMCRO clubhouse explodes. The second episode of Anarchy Afterword aired live on FX.com on the same night and is now on Season 6 DVD as an extra.
72	6	"Salvage"	Adam Arkin	Mike Daniels & Kurt Sutter	October 15, 2013	6WAB06	4.35
While on their way to a summit meeting with several West Coast SOA charters, the Charming charter is pulled over by dirty cops, but the bikers escape. At the summit, Jax announces the end of the gun business with the IRA and is met with agreement and approval. Bobby brings in new members to the Charming chapter. The state attorney still threatens to prosecute Tara unless she testifies against SOA. Roosevelt searches Toric's motel room and leaves convinced of Nero's innocence.
73	7	"Sweet and Vaded"	Paris Barclay	Kurt Sutter & Adria Lang	October 22, 2013	6WAB07	4.38
SAMCRO comes to the aid of Nero's transgender friend. Tara is more determined to make a break from Gemma, though possibly not from Jax. Tara fakes an assault and gets a restraining order against Gemma.
74	8	"Los Fantasmas"	Peter Weller	Roberto Patino & Kurt Sutter	October 29, 2013	6WAB08	4.20
The DA leaks a story to the press of who the possible suppliers of the guns in the school shooting are, and the story ends up in the front page of the town's paper. An unknown man runs down and kills a Byz-Lat in the middle of street, in the presence of Jax and the other SOA members. While the Byz-Lats attempt to kill the man, Jax intervenes upon discovering the man's son was killed in the school shooting, and the story in the paper incited him to kill the Byz-Lat. Police arrive at the man's house only to witness him commit suicide because he feels he no longer has a purpose in life. Nero, still in jail, decides to give himself up as the source of the gun rather than blame the SOA. Patterson accepts his confession at first but later repents after seeing the effect the story she leaked had (the father committing suicide) and sets Nero free after it is forensically proven that Toric killed Erin Byrne. The title, translated, means "The Ghosts".
75	9	"John 8:32"	Guy Ferland	Kem Nunn & Kurt Sutter	November 5, 2013	6WAB09	4.49
Nero wakes up at Gemma’s house, and she brings him up to speed about her conflict with Tara. Jax confronts Tara about not being able to say, "I love you", since returning from Stockton. Meanwhile, Patterson (the DA) gives Roosevelt three extra surveillance units to monitor Jax and the club. Furthermore, Patterson creates bumps in the road for the new Diosa operation and puts pressure on Barosky in Stockton due to his relationship with the Sons. Realizing the risk of going head to head with Patterson, the club agrees to compromise and make the DA an offer. Jax goes to her office and agrees to give up the IRA (Galan) within the next 10 days, in exchange for immunity for the club. Patterson agrees and tells Jax she’ll lay off the club for the next 10 days. Meanwhile, Clay goes to a prayer service in jail, where he argues with the pastor, gets into a fight with a guard, and bites off part of the guard’s face. This is part of the plan to break Clay out, as Clay is moved to a psych room, where a doctor allows him a phone call to the IRA. Back at Charming, Tara gets Lowen to file the paperwork moving financial and other matters into separate accounts. Also, Nero tries to convince Jax there is more to the situation between Gemma and Tara, but Jax gets upset and makes it clear that he does not want to mix business and family matters. Nevertheless, Nero goes to the hospital to convince Tara to resolve issues with Gemma, but Tara is enraged and tells him to worry about himself, as Gemma killed her previous husband. Also at the hospital, Gemma confronts Margaret Murphy, who accidentally confirms Gemma’s suspicion that Tara was never pregnant. Later in the day, Jax confronts Nero about visiting Tara, they get into a fight, and Gemma comes to break it up. She tells Jax what Margaret said and that Tara is filing for divorce. Jax, confused, traps Lowen in Unser’s RV and gets the truth out of her that Tara is planning on divorcing him and taking the kids away. Meanwhile, Nero confronts Gemma about what Tara said, and Gemma tells him the whole story, which she hadn’t told anyone before. The episode ends with Tara at home in a rocking chair singing to Thomas with a gun on her lap. Intertwined in this episode is also a story about a teenage girl who blames the Sons for the death of her mother, who is revealed to be the homeless woman Jax has been seeing around town for the last six years.
76	10	"Huang Wu"	Billy Gierhart	Kurt Sutter & Charles Murray	November 12, 2013	6WAB10	4.38
Jax apologizes to Gemma and Nero for what happened with Tara after he discovered all the truth. After Clay locks down all of SAMCRO's gun customers, only one customer is left waiting to close on the deal, the Italian Cacuzza family. Jax and the Irish meet with Jimmy Cacuzza to ensure they're onboard with Clay's being the new distributor. In an attempt to secure the Italians as customers the Irish attack the Chinese (Lin), leaving SAMCRO in a very compromising position. After the meet, SAMCRO is kidnapped by the Chinese, who demand the Sons to hand over the business and territory, or else. The Chinese keep Happy as insurance that Jax will honor their demand. Tara catches Jax in bed with Collette and leaves angrily. Irate at everything that's gone on she decides to try to make a deal with DA Patterson but Patterson refuses, stating the deal is no longer on the table.
77	11	"Aon Rud Persanta"	Peter Weller	Chris Collins & Kurt Sutter	November 19, 2013	6WAB11	4.17
Clay gets broken out during his prison transfer, and Bobby gets shot in the process. Jax exacts his revenge on the Irish and Clay for past wrongdoings. Patterson is unhappy with the way Jax upheld his end of the deal and makes it seem as if she's going to throw that deal out. Tara contemplates making a deal of her own to stay out of jail, and get her and her sons out of Charming for good.
78	12	"You Are My Sunshine"	Paris Barclay	Kem Nunn & Mike Daniels & Kurt Sutter	December 3, 2013	6WAB12	4.58
As Jax reaches the verge of getting SAMCRO permanently out of the gun business, Tara makes a bold move in protecting her children. Juice's guilt leads Nero to the truth about Darvany's death. Mr. Wu's revenge on the Irish comes with unexpected consequences. After finding out the Sons are handing over the gun business to August Marks, Alvarez reaches out to Nero.
79	13	"A Mother's Work"	Kurt Sutter	Kurt Sutter & Chris Collins	December 10, 2013	6WAB13	5.17
Jax's search for Tara and his children leads him to make a difficult decision. Nero confronts Jax over Juice's role in Darvany's murder. Alvarez and Lin form a pact against the One Niners, which threatens to shut down SAMCRO's business in Stockton. Upon discovering, by Unser, that Tara has "made a deal", Gemma confronts Tara with violent results.

== Reception ==
Season six has received generally favorable reviews. At Metacritic, the season received a critic score of 74% based on 9 critic reviews. On review aggregator website Rotten Tomatoes, it has an approval rating of 76% based on 25 reviews. The site's critical consensus reads: "Sons of Anarchy continues to deliver an energetic blend of bracing action sequences, pitch black humor, and heartless violence." At IGN, season 6 episodes received critic ratings ranging from a low of 8.1 (Episode 604, labelled "Great" and "Editors' Choice") to a high of 9.5 (Episode 611, labelled "Amazing", and "Editors' Choice").

== Home media release ==
The sixth season was released in the United States on DVD and Blu-ray on August 26, 2014.
