= The Moth & The Flame =

American rock band

- Origin: Provo, Utah, United States
- Genres: Art rock; alternative rock
- Years active: 2011–present
- Labels: Hidden Records; Elektra Records; Robot Farming
- Members: Brandon Robbins; Mark Garbett; Andrew Tolman
- Past members: Michael Goldman
- Website: themothandtheflame.band

The Moth & The Flame, sometimes known by initialism TMTF, is an American alternative rock band based in Los Angeles, California.

== History ==
=== The Moth ⅋ The Flame album (2011–2012) ===
The Moth & The Flame released their eponymous debut album on November 11, 2011 (11.11.11). The album was initially not available for purchase in a digital format in appreciation of the album art work, and was instead only available to stream on Soundcloud; however, in November 2019, the band made the album available for purchase on vinyl and streaming on Spotify. The album was produced by Nate Pyfer and engineered by Scott Wiley (Neon Trees, Elvis Costello) and mixed by Mike Roskelley (Kaskade, Skrillex, Deadmau5). To promote their music, the band created large pieces (sometimes as much as 20 feet (6 m)) of anthropomorphic artwork, which they placed strategically in their home town of Provo, Utah, to alert fans of upcoming shows.

In 2011, TMTF toured the western United States with Fictionist.

In October 2012, RadioWest debuted a new theme song by The Moth & The Flame.

In 2012, the band toured the US and performed at Audiotree, Mill Valley Film Festival ASCAP Showcase, and Midpoint Music Festival.

In 2013, they showcased at South By Southwest Music Festival, North By Northeast Music Festival and performed at Sundance Film Festival. They toured the UK in May 2013 making their first appearance overseas at The Great Escape Festival in Brighton. They performed at KCRW sponsored It's A School Night and at New Noise Music Festival 2013.

=== Ampersand EP (2013) ===
On November 5, 2013, the six-track Ampersand EP ('&' EP) was released internationally through RED Distribution label Hidden Records. Ampersand EP was produced by Joey Waronker (Atoms for Peace, Beck, R.E.M.) and features the single "Sorry". Nylon featured track "Sorry" as a free download in September 2013. KCRW listed it as one of "Four Songs You Should Listen to Right Now". A music video for "Sorry" premiered on mtvU on Friday, November 22, 2013. The band was chosen as the "New Band of the Day" by The Guardian on Friday November 22, 2013. "Sorry" was chosen as the Track of the Day by Clash BBC Radio 1 played "Sorry" as its Next Hype track selected by Zane Lowe. "Sorry" reached #1 on KROQ's Locals Only Playlist. A music video for "Winsome" was released on NPR.

TMTF supported Imagine Dragons alongside Dan Croll on their Night Visions Tour in Europe during the fall and winter of 2013 to promote the EP. TMTF also supported Imagine Dragons at two United States shows during the summer of 2013. They also toured with The Naked and Famous. In fall of 2014 TMTF supported Neon Trees and Placebo on tours. In 2015 TMTF toured with Big Data.

=== Young & Unafraid ===
The band's second album was made with the help of producer/mixer Peter Katis (Interpol, The National), Tony Hoffer (M83, Beck), and Nate Pyfer (Parlor Hawk, Fictionist). The album features strings arrangements from Rob Moose (Bon Iver, Sufjan Stevens, yMusic). The band released the album's lead single "Young & Unafraid" in May 2015. On December 20, 2016, Robbins underwent a kidney transplant with longtime friend Corey Fox, effectively putting the band on hiatus as they recovered.

=== Ruthless ===
The band's social media stayed relatively quiet for most of 2018 until they announced in August that they were releasing a new single, "Beautiful Couch", along with their third studio album in early 2019. They released two more singles, "The New Great Depression" and "Only Just Begun", before releasing their third studio album, Ruthless, on February 1, 2019.

The group has also gone on to release several singles with electronic musicians, such as Kaskade and Deadmau5.

== Band members ==
Current members

- Brandon Robbins – lead vocals, guitar
- Mark Garbett – keyboards, synthesizer, backing vocals
- Andrew Tolman – drums, backing vocals

Touring musicians

- Michael Goldman – bass

== Discography ==
=== Studio albums ===
- The Moth ⅋ The Flame (2011)
- Young & Unafraid (2016)
- Ruthless (2019)

=== Extended plays ===
- ⅋ (2013)
- Young & Unafraid (2015)

=== Singles ===
- "Young & Unafraid" (2015) #35 Alternative Songs
- "Red Flag" (2016) #37 Alternative Songs
- "Beautiful Couch" (2018)
- "The New Great Depression" (2018) #40 Alternative Songs
- "Only Just Begun" (2019)
- "Haunt Me" (Kaskade feature) (2020)
- "Haunt Me V.2" (Kaskade feature) (2021)
- "Alive" (Kx5 feature) (2022)

== Music videos ==
List of music videos, showing year released and director
Title	Year	Director(s)
"Sorry"	2013	Devin McGinn
"Winsome"	2014	Rebecca Thomas
"How We Woke Up"	2014	Devin McGinn
"Young & Unafraid"	2015	Rebecca Thomas
"The New Great Depression"	2018	Will Kindrick
