= Joshua James (folk singer) =

American singer-songwriter

- Origin: Lincoln, Nebraska, US
- Genres: Alternative rock, folk rock
- Occupation: Singer-songwriter
- Instruments: Vocals, guitar, piano
- Years active: 2003–present
- Label: Intelligent Noise/Northplatte Records
- Website: www.joshuajames.tv

Joshua James is an American singer-songwriter based out of American Fork, Utah, and Lincoln, Nebraska.

His original digital release of The Sun is Always Brighter on iTunes reached No. 1 on the service's Folk Album list in 2007 and sold in excess of 25,000 copies by the end of 2008. The album caught the attention of the indie folk scene, with Paste Magazine naming him one of their "Next 25 Artists You Need To Know" in their September 2008 issue.

NPR cited James in one of their "Song of the Day" publishings. They featured his "The New Love Song".

Variety called James "a young Midwestern singer-songwriter who writes hard-bitten songs of family tragedies and sings them in a voice that's as sun-bleached and wind-battered as a Nebraska cornfield".

On December 1, 2019, James released "Discover Responsibility Through Fatherhood" with fellow musician Nate Pyfer. Later that month on December 24, 2019, James released "Magical Leaves Red White Black Heat", which he described as a compilation of "Songs about country. Songs about Christmas. Songs about acceptance. And solitude, commitment, and New Years". On September 22, 2020, Joshua James released an album titled Dreams of Karen with his mother Reesa James. The album consists of 8 cover songs including four originally by The Carpenters. On June 18, 2021, James released an album titled Forever In Life, For Now dedicated to his friend Seth Howell who died on April 20, 2020.

His song Coal Wars was featured as the opening song of Sons of Anarchy season 4, and his song Crash This Train was featured as the closing song of the show’s sixth season seventh episode.

== Discography ==
=== Albums ===
- B-Sides: It's Dark Outside (2006)
- The Sun Is Always Brighter (2008), iTunes "Best of 2008" Folk Album
- Build Me This (2009), iTunes "Best of 2009" Indie Spotlight Singer-Songwriter Album
- From The Top of Willamette Mountain (2012) US Folk No. 23
- Well, Then, I'll Go to Hell (2013)
- My Spirit Sister (2017)
- Discover Responsibility Through Fatherhood (with Nate Pyfer) (2019)
- Magical Leaves Red White Black Heat (2019)
- Wasteland 3: Cult of the Holy Detonation Chants & Incantations (2020) "Grand Ole' Flag"
- Dreams Of Karen (2020)
- Forever In Life, For Now (2021)

=== EPs ===
- Fields and Floods (2007)
- Crash This Train / The Garden digital EP (2008)
- Sing Songs EP (2009)
- Joshua James: iTunes Sessions (2010)
- BEWARE! (2013)

=== Singles ===
- Golden Bird b/w Pretty Feather (Need To Know, 2018)
