= Music of Utah =

The cultural Music of Utah, while having been significantly influenced by the presence of the Church of Jesus Christ of Latter-day Saints (LDS Church), includes several thriving local scenes and a large number of musicians across a variety of genres. That said, much of the distinctiveness of Utah's musical traditions has derived from the interaction between individuals of multiple beliefs in the uniquely religious context of the state.

== Contemporary Utah music scene ==
Utah has produced some popular recording artists since 2000. Its local music scene features some nationally recognized bands, mostly based in Provo and Salt Lake City. Notable bands include Neon Trees, Fictionist, Imagine Dragons, The New Electric Sound, The Moth & the Flame, King Niko and The Brobecks. Many genres are represented, including rock, indie folk, emo, synthpop, singer-songwriter, death metal, blues, punk rock, goth, alternative rock, hip-hop, jazz, country, Reggae, Ska and religious music.

=== Hip-hop and R&B ===
JTM released his debut I'm Not a Rapper in 2016 which reached No. 1 on the Billboard Heatseekers chart and No. 13 on the Billboard R&B/Hip-Hop chart.

UT-born producer KC Supreme has received multiple Multi-Platinum awards as well as multiple Billboard #1 awards. His production credits include Trevor Daniel, Lil Uzi Vert, Future, Juice Wrld, Lil Tecca, Rich The Kid, Chris Brown, T-Pain, Trippie Redd, Kevin Gates, Megan Thee Stallion, Yk Osiris, Rico Nasty, Lil Tjay, 24k Goldn, Yung Pinch, Quando Rondo, Fredo Bang, Iann Dior, YNW Melly, blackbear, Summer Walker, Don Toliver, Lil Skies, etc.

=== Rock ===
Utah has enjoyed a substantial rock music scene. Sky Saxon, frontman and founder to influential 1960's Garage Rock and Proto-Punk band The Seeds, was born and grew up in Salt Lake City. Before finding international success with The Seeds, he recorded and released a string of Doo-Wop singles under the name "Little Richie Marsh" and founded Salt Lake bands "The Electra-Fires" and "The Soul Rockers".

More contemporarily, Post-Hardcore band The Used (Warner Music Group-owned Reprise Records) was formed in Orem in 2001. The Used have released two gold-certified albums in the United States.

Neon Trees (formerly Mercury Records) formed in Provo, Utah in the early 2000s. In 2010, their single, "Animal," reached number one on the Billboard Alternative Songs chart. Neon Trees have released two multi-platinum singles domestically.

Sisters Meg and Dia Frampton formed Meg & Dia in Draper and until recently were signed to Warner Music Group-owned label, Doghouse Records.

Royal Bliss, from Salt Lake City signed with Capitol Records in 2007.

Fictionist, from Provo was signed with Atlantic Records between 2011 and 2014.

Imagine Dragons (Interscope Records) formed in Provo in 2008, and later moved to Las Vegas after winning battle of the bands competitions at Velour Music Gallery (Provo, UT) and Brigham Young University. The band's single "Radioactive" earned a Grammy Award for Best Rock Performance. They have received four diamond certified singles domestically to date and are widely regarded as one of the most popular contemporary rock artists in recent years.

=== Folk ===
Folk music constituted some of the earliest music in Utah. Songs were usually sung without accompaniment because of the scarcity of musical instruments in the region. Although often employing the same traditional tunes as folk music elsewhere, Mormon settlers sometimes altered lyrical themes in reference to their own lives and religious convictions.

Peter Breinholt, a Salt Lake City native, found success in the 1990s as a Singer-Songwriter following the self-release a series of tapes, largely by word of mouth. Initially centered in and around The University of Utah's underground music scene, Breinholt's music eventually proliferated through the state and surrounding Southwest region. As of 2023, his debut LP, Songs About the Great Divide was the fastest selling independently released album in the state's history. Currently a music professor at Snow College, Breinholt has since released seven full lengths albums and performed with Jon Schmidt, Masa Fukuda, Steven Sharp Nelson, Paul Cardall and the Mormon Tabernacle Choir. In 2002, he performed at the 2002 Winter Olympics.

Newgrass artists Ryan Shupe and the RubberBand had a country music hit single in 2005, "Dream Big." while they were signed to Capitol Records.

Provo based folk singer-songwriter Joshua James had moderate success in 2007 when his album The Sun is Always Brighter reached number 1 on the iTunes Folk Album chart.

Provo songwriter Isaac Russell left his deal with Utah-based Northplatte Records to sign with Columbia Records only to later return to Northplatte Records.

Neofolk rock group Parlor Hawk were featured by iTunes Indie Spotlight as one of the "Best of 2010 Singer-Songwriter Albums" and earned an Independent Music Award for "Saddest Song" in 2012.

The National Parks formed in 2013 in Provo, UT. Their debut album reached No. 13 on the iTunes singer/songwriter charts and single "As We Ran" has been streamed more than 25M times on Spotify.

Ogden based folk singer-songwriter Sammy Brue signed to New West Records and released his debut album in 2017.

=== Pop ===
In 2007, David Archuleta rose to the national spotlight as a major contestant in the seventh season of American Idol. His debut pop album on Jive Records was certified gold by the RIAA.

Provo-based songwriter Mindy Gledhill's 2010 pop album Anchor became a hit abroad including seven songs charting on the South Korean charts and tours in SE Asia. The album sold more than 15,000 copies.

=== Metal ===
The city is home to Progressive act Katagory V. The band has released four LPs and signed with Nightmare Records in the U.S. and later Burning Star Records in Europe. Katagory V has appeared at notable heavy metal festivals in the U.S. including the ProgPower USA festival in Atlanta, Georgia.

Salt Lake City deathcore band Chelsea Grin, is also a prominent name in the genre, having currently released four LPs and two EPs.

Known in the sludge and doom metal genres, Salt Lake City is also home to bands Eagle Twin and Subrosa.

=== A cappella ===
Utah has an a cappella music scene. Some groups include Voice Male, Octappella, Rifftide, UVU's Voiceline, BYU's Vocal Point and Vocalocity.

=== Classical ===
Paul Cardall (Stone Angel Music) has independently released various recordings that have debuted No. 1 on 11 Billboard Magazine charts with 43 other additional chart debuts. The pianist is the first Utahn to receive the Gospel Music Association Dove Award for Instrumental Album of The Year Gospel Music Association in 2019.

Jenny Oaks Baker (Shadow Mountain Records) is a former National Symphony Orchestra violinist in Utah who received a nomination for Grammy Award for Best Pop Instrumental Album in 2011.

Lindsey Stirling (Bridgetone) is a violinist/dancer. Her debut album was certified Platinum in Germany and Austria, while her single "Crystallize" was certified gold in the United States.

The Piano Guys (Sony) have released three consecutive No. 1 albums on the U.S. Classical albums charts.

=== Indie ===
Salt Lake City as well as the adjacent Provo have both fostered popular indie rock scenes, with notable artists including Neon Trees, Imagine Dragons, The Used, The Backseat Lovers, The Aces, Ritt Momney, Uzi and Ari, The Brobecks, Fictionist, Choir Boy, Mindy Gledhill, Meg and Dia, King Niko, Joshua James, Allred, and The New Electric Sound.

== Music from the Tabernacle Choir at Temple Square ==
The state's most famous musical group is The Tabernacle Choir at Temple Square. Named after the Salt Lake Tabernacle on Temple Square in Salt Lake City, Utah, the 300+ member choir is world-famous. The choir performs at least weekly at the Tabernacle for a radio program called "Music and the Spoken Word". The Tabernacle Choir at Temple Square was first recorded in 1910 has released more than 100 albums. Billboard Magazine declared that they were the year-end Top Charting Traditional Classical Albums artist of 2012. The choir has been awarded the National Medal of Arts, a GRAMMY Award, and even been inducted into the National Recording Registry at the Library of Congress.

== Utah music events ==
The Ogden Music Festival, 3-day outdoor festival featuring bluegrass, blues, folk & rockabilly is held the first weekend in June at Ogden's Fort Buenaventura with on-site camping.

The Park City & SLC Music Festival and Autumn Classics Music Festival, formerly the Deer Valley Music Festival, the Park City International Music Festival and Autumn Classics Music Festival, is held in Park City and Salt Lake City. These are projects of the Park City Chamber Music Society (PCCMS). PCCMS founded the original Deer Valley Music Festival and the name was changed to Park City International Music Festival after a number of years.

Founded in 2001, The Salt Lake City Jazz Festival is the largest annual Jazz showcase in the state.

The Utah Symphony was founded in 1940 by Maurice Abravanel and performs at Abravanel Hall, a modern concert hall in downtown Salt Lake City. The symphony merged in 2002 with the Utah Opera Company, which was organized in 1978.

The Utah Valley Symphony is a community orchestra organized in Utah County, Utah in 1959.

ForkFest is an annual single-day indie/rock music festival held in American Fork. The festival focuses on musicians from Utah or those with significant connections to Utah. Previous headliners have included I Dont Know How but They Found Me, The Aces, and Joshua James.

== Publications ==
Utah has multiple print and online publications focused on local scenes. Two notable publications include:

- Provo Music Magazine - Provo Music Magazine is a print and online publication covering all Utah music (with a focus on the Provo/Orem scenes) that was started by Deseret Noise Company in 2022. The magazine includes interviews, album reviews, and news about Utah musicians. It also serves as an archive for earlier Provo-based music publications and features all previously published articles from Reach Provo, Analog Provo, Provo Buzz, and Provo Music Guide.
- SLUG Magazine - SLUG Magazine (short for Salt Lake UnderGround Magazine) is a print publication started in 1988 that focuses on the art, music, entertainment, and culture of the Salt Lake area. The magazine focuses on interviews, reviews, and other relevant articles.

== Notable musicians from Utah ==
Producers

- Finn Bjarnson – Grammy nominated
- Nate Pyfer – Grammy nominated

Individuals

- Paul Cardall
- David Archuleta
- Jenny Oaks Baker – Grammy nominated
- Dan Truman of Diamond Rio – Grammy Winner
- Mindy Gledhill
- Kaskade – Grammy nominated
- Hugh McDonald
- Paul Richards of California Guitar Trio
- Wayne Sermon of Imagine Dragons – Grammy Winner
- Peter Breinholt
- Branden Steineckert
- Lindsey Stirling
- Dallon Weekes
- Veronica Franco

Groups

- Get Scared
- The Used
- Neon Trees
- Imagine Dragons
- Osmonds, including Donny and Marie Osmond – Grammy Lifetime Achievement Award, Rock and Roll Hall of Fame inductee Donny Osmond had a No. 1 Hot 100 hit with "Go Away Little Girl" in 1971
- SheDaisy – Grammy nominated
- The Piano Guys
- The Moth & the Flame
- Uzi and Ari
- Chelsea Grin
- The National Parks (band)
- Michael Barrow & The Tourists
- The Backseat Lovers
- Fictionist

== Record labels ==
Although no major record labels are based in Utah, there are several small independent labels, such as Northplatte Records. The End Records is an independent metal and rock label that has signed some avant-garde and experimental groups. It was formed in Pasadena, CA and relocated to Salt Lake City and is currently based in Brooklyn, New York.

== Venues ==
=== Northern Utah ===
Notable venues in the Salt Lake Area include

- Abravanel Hall
- Kilby Court
- Metro Music Hall
- The Complex
- The Depot
- The Great Saltair
- The Urban Lounge

Notable venues in the Provo/Orem Area include

- Covey Center for the Arts
- The Boardwalk
- The Rise
- Velour Live Music Gallery

Notable venues in the Park City Area include

- Park City Live – 427 Main St.
