= List of Utah musical groups =

The following is a list of prominent Utah musical groups.

Prominent Utah musical groups

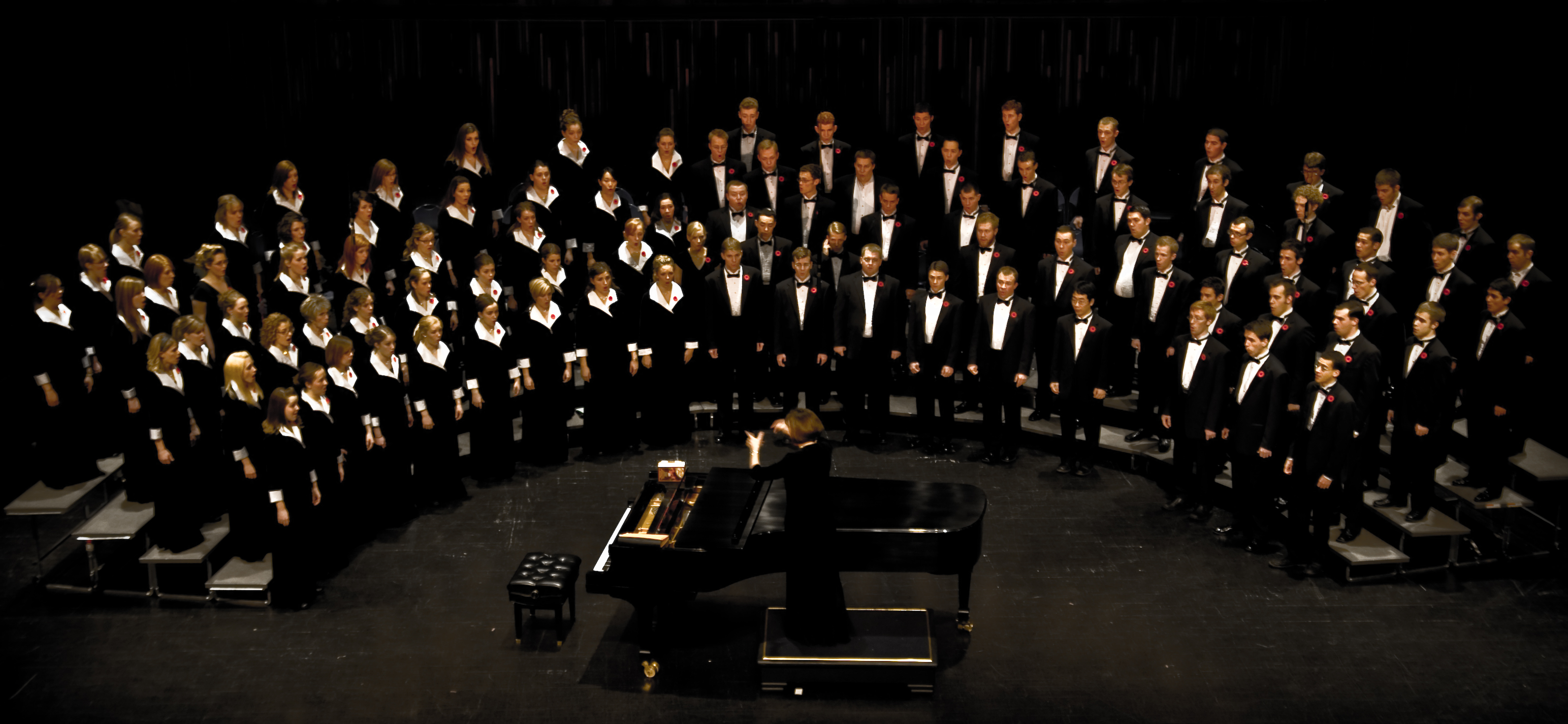
BYU Concert Choir

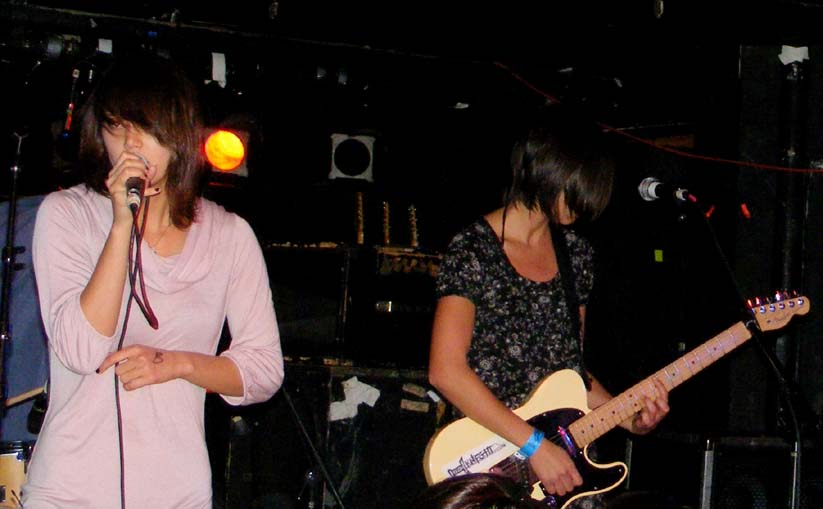
Meg and Dia

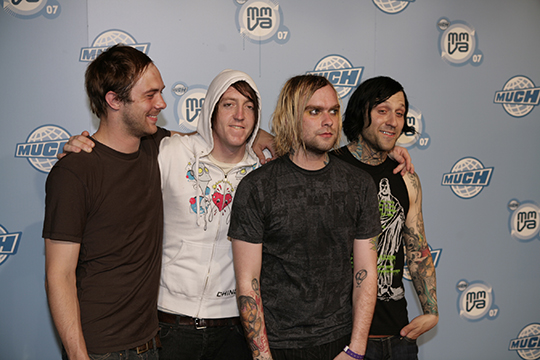
The Used

== A ==
- Acroma, alternative rock band

== B ==
- BYU Choirs, classical and modern music
- The Backseat Lovers, alternative rock band
- The Brobecks

== C ==
- Chelsea Grin, extreme metal band
- Cult Leader, Metal

== F ==
- The 5 Browns, classical piano musical group
- Fictionist

== G ==
- Get Scared, post-hardcore band
- GENTRI, classical and pop blend

== I ==
- Imagine Dragons, rock, alternative rock, and pop band
- I Dont Know How but They Found Me, alternative and indie rock

== K ==
- Katagory V, power metal band

== M ==
- Meg & Dia, indie rock band
- Michael Barrow & The Tourists, indie folk/rock band

== N ==
- The New Transit Direction, indie rock band
- Neon Trees, American rock

== O ==
- Octappella, contemporary a cappella group
- Orchestra at Temple Square, symphony orchestra
- The Osmonds, family pop group

== P ==
- The Piano Guys, Classic/Pop

== R ==
- Royal Bliss, alternative rock
- Ritt Momney, indie rock

== S ==
- SHeDAISY, country music group
- Ryan Shupe & The RubberBand, country music group
- Sleepthief, electronic recording project
- Stonecircle, fusion group
- Swim Herschel Swim, Ska

== T ==
- The Tabernacle Choir at Temple Square, religious and classical music
- The National Parks (Band), American folk pop band
- The Clingers, first all-female rock & roll group

== U ==
- The Used, rock band
- Utah Chamber Artists, classical music orchestra and choir
- Utah Festival Opera, opera company
- Utah Symphony Orchestra, symphony orchestra
- Utah Valley Symphony, symphony orchestra

== V ==
- Vocal Point, contemporary a cappella group

== Y ==
- Young Ambassadors, song and dance performing group
