= Allred =

Allred is an English surname. Notable people with this name include:

- Albert L. Allred (born 1931), American chemist
- Alexandra Allred (born 1965), American athlete and author
- Austen Allred, founder of Lambda School, later called Bloom Institute of Technology
- Beau Allred (born 1965), American baseball player
- Bill Allred, various people
- Brian Allred (born 1969), American football player
- Cary D. Allred (1947–2011), American politician
- Colin Allred (born 1983), American football player and politician
- Corbin Allred (born 1979), American actor
- Gloria Allred (born 1941), American lawyer and radio talk host
- James V. Allred (1889–1959), American politician
- Janice Merrill Allred (born 1947), American Mormon theologian, writer, and feminist
- Jen Allred (born 1961), Guamanian former long-distance runner
- John Allred (born 1974), American football player
- John Allred (born 1962), American jazz trombonist
- Julie Allred, American child actress
- Karl Allred, Wyoming politician
- Keith G. Allred (born 1964), 2010 Democratic nominee for Governor of Idaho
- Keith J. Allred (1955–2018), American naval lawyer
- Ken Allred (born 1940), Canadian politician
- Lance Allred (born 1981), American basketball player
- Lane Allred, American politician
- Laura Allred, American comic book artist
- Loren Allred (born 1989) American singer, songwriter and actress
- Mike Allred (born 1962), American comic book artist and writer
- Owen A. Allred (1914–2005), American Mormon fundamentalist leader
- Reddick Allred (1822–1906), American Mormon pioneer, missionary, and colonel
- Rulon C. Allred (1906–1977), American Mormon fundamentalist leader
- Silas Allred (born 2002), American wrestler
- Vic Allred (born 1962/1963), American politician

== See also ==
- Allred, Nevada
- Allred, Tennessee
- Allred, Texas
- Allred Unit, prison in Wichita County, Texas, United States
