= Ben Shephard (disambiguation) =

Ben Shephard (born 1974) is an English television presenter and journalist.

Ben Shephard, Shepherd, Shepard or Sheppard may also refer to:

- Ben Shephard (historian) (1948–2017), British historian
- Ben Shepherd (born 1968), American musician
- Ben H. Shepherd, British historian of World War II
- Ben Sheppard (Australian sportsman) (1890–1931), Australian sportsman who played cricket and Australian rules football
- Ben Sheppard (basketball), American basketball player
- Ben Shepard, founder of American indie rock band Uzi and Ari
- Ben Sheppard Elementary, a Miami-Dade County Public School, Florida, U.S
