= The American Dollar =

The American Dollar may refer to:

- United States dollar
- The American Dollar (band), American instrumental band
