= After the Reign =

After the Reign may refer to:

- After the Reign (album), an album by Blackfoot
- After the Reign (band), an American country music band
