= Swim Team =

Swim Team may refer to:

- Swim Team (film), a 2016 American documentary
- Swim Team (TV series), a 2015–2016 Indian teen drama series
- Swim Team (Arms and Sleepers album), 2014
- Swim Team (Dirty Heads album), 2017
- Swim Team (graphic novel), 2022 graphic novel by Johnnie Christmas
- Swim Team, an American hip hop group consisting of Open Mike Eagle and others

== See also ==
- Swimming (sport)
