= Arms and Sleepers =

Ambient/trip hop duo

- Origin: Boston, MA, USA; Portland, ME, USA
- Genres: Ambient, trip hop
- Years active: 2006 – present (hiatus 2012-2014)
- Labels: Fake Chapter Records, Expect Candy, Friend of Mine Records, Ericrock, Geertruida
- Spinoff of: The List Exists
- Members: Mirza Ramic
- Past members: Max Lewis
- Website: armsandsleepers.com

Arms and Sleepers is an transcontinental ambient/trip hop duo consisting of Max Lewis and Mirza Ramic. The band was formed in 2006 and has since released a handful of albums and EPs, including Bliss Was It in That Dawn to Be Alive, an EP released in 2006; Black Paris 86, an album released in 2007; and Matador, which was released in November 2009.

The band gives a cinematic experience when performing live, backing their music up with synchronised visuals created by Dado Ramadani.

== History ==
=== Formation and Black Paris 86 (2006–2008) ===
Both Max Lewis and Mirza Ramic were members of The List Exists, a post-rock band from Brunswick, Maine. After three years together, the band split up in 2006, with Lewis and Ramic forming Arms and Sleepers together. The band name reflects Ramic's view of the war in Bosnia, referring to those who wielded weapons and others who did little to stop it.

The first release from Arms and Sleepers was the Bliss Was It in That Dawn to Be Alive EP, which was put out on Fake Chapter Records in November 2006. The EP was positively received, and featured some tracks that would end up on the band's first full-length release. This was followed up with the self-titled EP which was released by Milkweed Records. The next two releases by the band, Cinématique and Lautlos EP, were limited and self-released. The group's first full-length album, Black Paris 86, was released in 2007 on both CD (Expect Candy Records) and 2x12" vinyl (Ericrock), and received a lot of praise in reviews.

=== Matador (2009–2010) ===
The band followed up their album with another self-released EP in early 2009, entitled The Motorist. Shortly after, the duo began work on their second LP, Matador. Matador was released in the USA (Fake Chapter Records), Europe (Expect Candy), and Japan (Friend of Mine Records). Like the band's previous full-length, Matador was also released on 12" vinyl. The album was well-received, and was noted for being more vocal-centric than their previous releases, featuring Japanese label mates and Uzi and Ari vocalists Ben Shepard and Catherine Worsham on The Architekt and 29 Palms

Arms and Sleepers also released a split EP with The American Dollar, entitled From the Inland Sea. The EP was released digitally in December 2009, with a vinyl release in early 2011. Both bands released three new songs each on the split EP, and a 7th bonus track, which both Arms and Sleepers and The American Dollar collaborated on, will be released exclusively on vinyl. Arms and Sleepers have since then released two EPs. The first, Matador Alternate Versions/B-Sides, was released on the European tour December 2009; Instrumentals I was released on CD in March 2010. The full length vinyl only Remix album Matador Remixed came out in May 2010 (Expect Candy).

=== The Organ Hearts (2011-present) ===
The band released their third album in May 2011, exclusively by Expect Candy Records. Once again, the album features several collaborations with Ben Shepard of Uzi and Ari. In 2017, Dutch record label Geertruida released the band's album Life Is Everywhere, followed by the extended play Miami.

== Members ==
=== Current lineup ===
- Mirza Ramic – programming, keyboards, bass (2006–present)

=== Former members ===
- Max Lewis – programming, keyboards (2006–2017)

== Discography ==
=== Albums ===
- Black Paris 86 (2007, CD Expect Candy Records, 2x12" Ericrock)
- Matador (2009, CD & 12" Fake Chapter Records (USA), CD Expect Candy (EU), CD Friend of Mine Records (Japan))
- Nostalgia for the Absolute (2011, Download, Expect Candy)
- The Organ Hearts (2011, CD Expect Candy)
- Swim Team (2014, Fake Chapter Records)
- Life Is Everywhere (January 2017, Fake Chapter Records/Geertruida)
- Find The Right Place (April 2018, Pelagic Records)
- Safe Area Earth (January 2020, Future Archive Recordings)
- Memory Loops (July 2020, interpret null)
- “Corpus Dei” (December 2020, Future Archive Recordings)

=== EPs ===
- Bliss Was It In That Dawn To Be Alive (2006, CD Fake Chapter Records)
- Arms and Sleepers (EP) (2007, CD Milkweed Records)
- Cinématique (2007, CD Self-released)
- Lautlos EP (2007, CD Self-released, tour-only CD)
- The Motorist (2009, CD Self-released)
- From The Inland Sea (2009, Split with The American Dollar, 12" Self-released)
- Matador Alternate Versions/B-Sides (December 2009, CD Self-released)
- Instrumentals I (March 2010, CD)
- A Man, A Plan, A Canal: Panama (August 2011, Self-released/Expect Candy Download only)
- Hurry Slowly (March 2014, Download only)
- Miami (2017, Geertruida)

=== Other ===
- Holiday CD/DVD (2007. CD/DVD Self-released)
