= Velour Live Music Gallery =

Music venue in Provo, Utah, U.S.

Coordinates: 40°14′08″N 111°39′32″W

- Velour
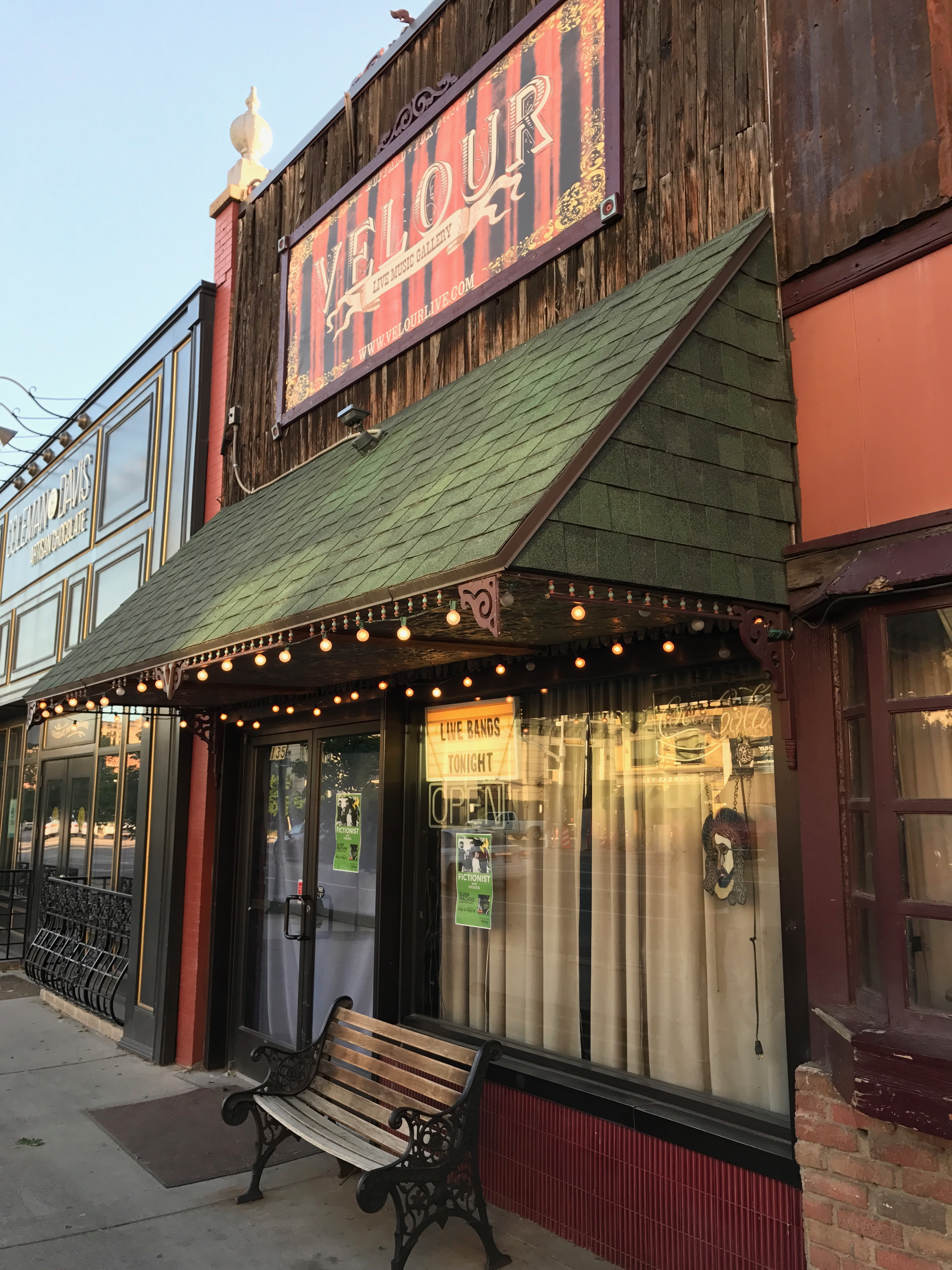
- The front of the Velour Live Music Gallery
- Interactive map of Velour Live Music Gallery
- Location: 135 North University Ave, Provo, Utah 84601
- Type: Music gallery
- Events: Rock, folk

Construction
- Opened: January 13, 2006

Website
- velourlive.com

Velour Live Music Gallery (often just Velour) is a music venue on University Avenue in Provo, Utah. Velour is owned by Corey Fox. It acts as an all-ages music venue catering to an eclectic mix of genres, as well as hosting the annual FilmQuest film festival. It is a smoking and alcohol free environment.

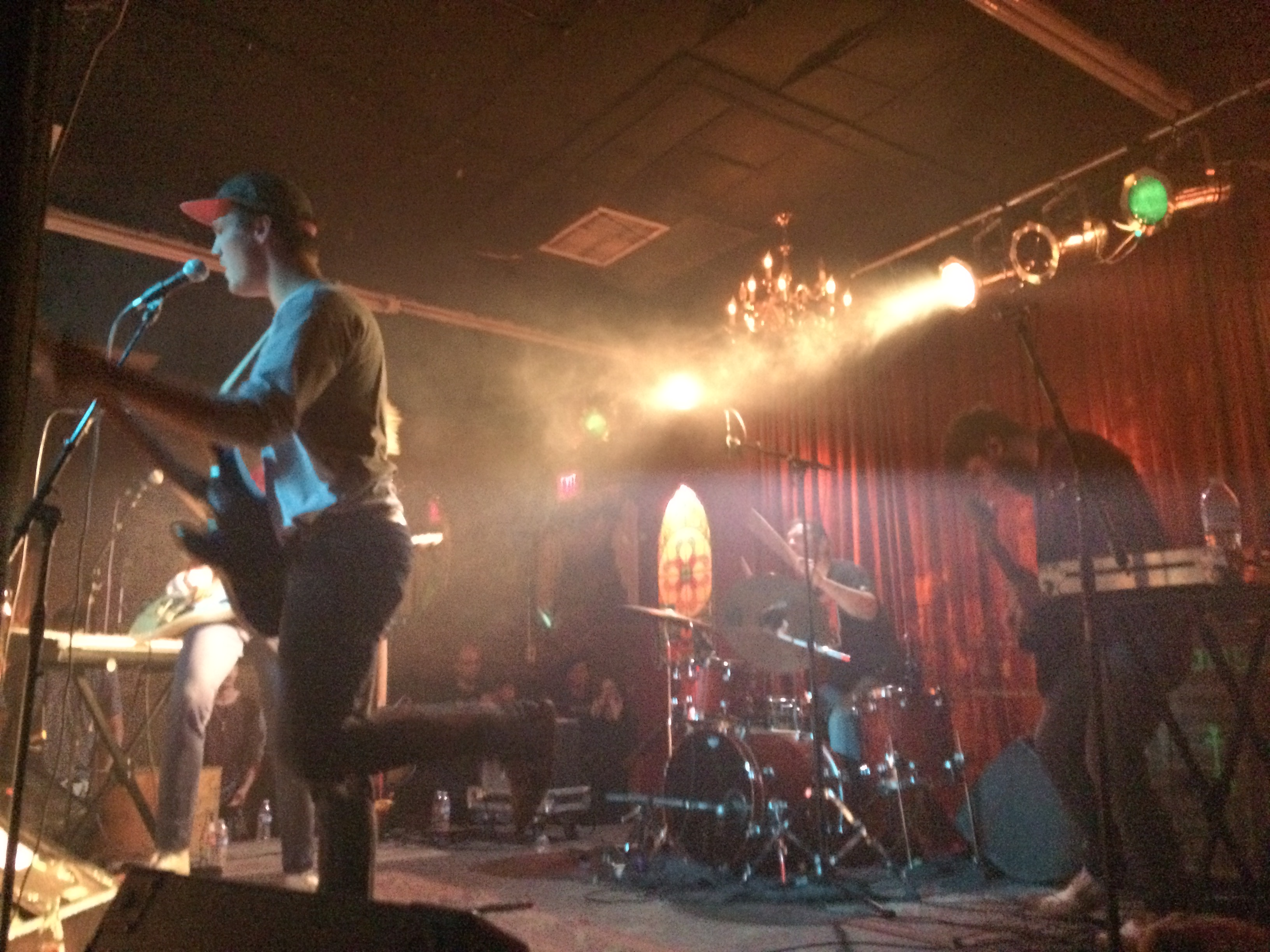
Fictionist performing at the Velour in Provo, Nov 2016

Neon Trees (Mercury) credit Velour as their home venue which helped launch their career. Other artists who similarly hold this same sentiment include major label artists Imagine Dragons (Interscope), Fictionist (Atlantic), Isaac Russell (Columbia), and notable folk singer Joshua James. Other Utah artists have hailed the work of Corey Fox and the value of Velour Live Music Gallery including internet sensation Lindsey Stirling, Truman Brothers and The Used (Hopeless). Imagine Dragons and Neon Trees are both past winners of the Velour Battle of the Bands.

SPIN has also dubbed Velour Live Music Gallery one of the Best Kept Secrets in Utah. Similarly, the venue was listed on the "Best of Utah" in 2007. BYUtv indie music show AUDIO-FILES has had multiple episodes filmed at Velour including episodes featuring Imagine Dragons, Joshua James, Damien Jurado, and others.

Artists, including Imagine Dragons, Neon Trees, Sara Bareilles, Matt Nathanson, Ryan Bingham & The Dead Horses, Local Natives, The National Parks, have played in this small venue.

== Awards ==
- "Best Musical Ambiance 2014" - Salt Lake City Weekly
- "Best Live Music Venue 2013" - Daily Herald
- "Best Musical Epicenter 2013" - Salt Lake City Weekly
- "Best Music Venue 2012" - Salt Lake Magazine
- "Best Provo All-Ages Venue 2011" - Salt Lake City Weekly
- "Best Music Venue 2009 - Readers' Choice" - Rhombus Magazine
- "Best Reason To Drive To Provo 2007" - Salt Lake City Weekly

== See also ==
- Music of Utah
