= The New Electric Sound =

American rock band

- Origin: Provo, Utah
- Genres: Indie rock, surf rock, pop rock
- Years active: 2011–present
- Members: Scott Vance; Benjamin Zabriskie; Nigel Goodwin; Tom Brinton; Anthony Carlson; Colin Hatch
- Past members: Eric Call
- Website: www.thenewelectricsound.com

The New Electric Sound is an American rock band from Provo, Utah. The band draws inspiration from early rock and roll and surf rock bands like The Surfaris, Dick Dale and Buddy Holly and modern influences like The Strokes and The Kooks. They are recognized largely by their vintage musical approach and visual aesthetic.

== History ==
=== Formation and debut album (2011–2012) ===
The band formed in late 2011 in Provo, Utah and began touring the Utah and Idaho regions. They released their self-titled debut album in August 2012 from June Audio (Neon Trees, Fictionist). The album was mastered by Reuben Cohen (Slumdog Millionaire, Snoop Dogg, The Cranberries, Bruno Mars). By late 2012, the band gained notoriety as one of the most notable Provo artists.

In July 2012, the band took first place in Provo's Rock the River contest, judged by notable figures of the music industry such as Quinn Allman of The Used, Megan Joy of American Idol, Jimmy Chunga of X96, Ryan Innes of American Idol and Amy Whitcombe of The Sing Off.

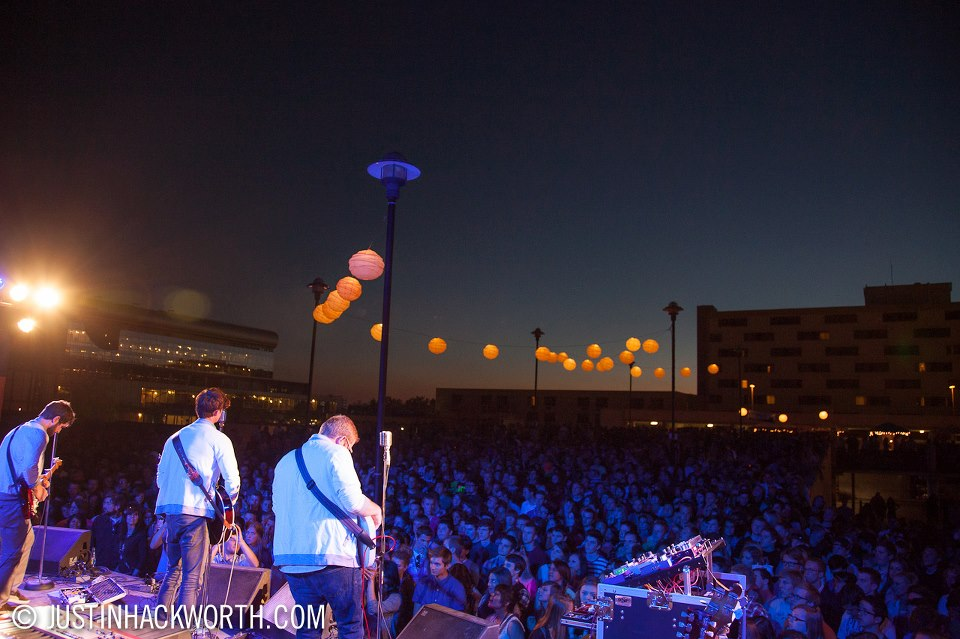
The New Electric Sound performing at The Provo Rooftop Concert Series

In September 2012, the band performed in Provo's Rooftop Concert Series with Provo band Fictionist. They have also performed with other notable artists such as Imagine Dragons, The Moth & the Flame, Fictionist, Vacationer, Con Bro Chill, Desert Noises, The Neighbors and Can't Stop Won't Stop.

In September 2012, The New Electric Sound's song Dream Interlude was placed in one of the episodes of the web series Tailgate 32, and the next month, the song Suitcase was placed in a Smart Car advertisement. Lindsey Stirling has also used The New Electric Sound's songs in her YouTube videos.

==== Music video ====
In late 2012, the band released their first music video online for their local hit song "Heartbeat", directed by Derek Pueblo. The music video features lead singer Scott Vance in a dark love triangle narrative based on the lyrics of the song. The video received high critical praises and was nominated for the best music video in the 2012 International Film Festival Manhattan awards and won Best Cinematography in the 2013 Filmed in Utah awards.

=== Los Angeles years (2013–present) ===
The band moved to Los Angeles in late 2013 and began playing shows throughout the southern California region, including a West coast tour through California, Utah, Idaho, Washington and Oregon.

In 2013, the band was selected by Google to sponsor their release of Google Fiber in Provo, Utah. The band appeared on Google's TV and radio spots, as well as several billboards throughout the city. The band also performed at the Google Fiber Grand Opening in Provo.

Band members Scott Vance and Benjamin Zabriskie also appeared in Imagine Dragons' 2013 music video for On Top of the World as Russian cosmonauts, along with actor Jon Heder and film monkey Katie the Capuchin. They released their second full-length album, "Tango," in April 2018.

== Styles and influences ==
The New Electric Sound is influenced by vintage artists such as Buddy Holly, The Zombies and The Beach Boys, but also more recent bands such as Vampire Weekend, The Strokes, The Kooks, Cage the Elephant and The Black Keys. They have been described as having 50s rock tones "with a hook filled melody, syncopated guitar and drum work and fine tenor lead vocal delivery." "To further enhance their simple, retro sound," writes Spencer Flanagan from City Weekly, "the band uses mostly vintage equipment, from their old Crumar organ to the old-fashioned Super 55 microphones." Along with vintage equipment, The New Electric Sound also presents a vintage stage image. Ashley-Jayne Osborne from Vinyl Sea Press writes, "They're a mixture of pompadour hairdo’s and thick-rimmed glasses, cardigans over button-up shirts and sharp looking shoes."

== Members ==
- Scott Vance (lead vocals, guitars)
- Colin Hatch (bass, vocals, percussion)
- Benjamin Zabriskie (lead guitar, vocals)
- Nigel Goodwin (keys)
- Tony Carlson (drums)
- Tom Brinton (bass, vocals)

Past Members

- Eric Call (keys, trumpet)
