= Sean Pouche =

American politician

Member of the Missouri House of Representatives from the 13th district
- Incumbent
- Assumed office January 5, 2021
- Preceded by: Vic Allred
- Succeeded by: John Elliott (elect)

Personal details
- Party: Republican
- Children: 2
- Education: United States Merchant Marine Academy (BS)

Military service
- Branch/service: United States Navy
- Battles/wars: Iraq War; War in Afghanistan

Sean Scobee Pouche is an American politician serving as a member of the Missouri House of Representatives from the 13th district. Elected in November 2020, he assumed office on January 5, 2021.

== Early life and education ==
Pouche was raised in Platte County, Missouri and graduated from Rockhurst High School. He earned a Bachelor of Science degree from the United States Merchant Marine Academy.

== Career ==
After graduating from college, Pouche received his commission to the United States Navy Reserve. He was later deployed to Iraq and Afghanistan, where he served as an advisor to NATO officials. Pouche has also worked for his family's business, Platte Rental & Supply. Pouche was elected to the Missouri House of Representatives in 2020, placing first in the Republican primary and defeating Democratic nominee Victor Abundis in the general election.

== Electoral history ==
Missouri House of Representatives Election, November 3, 2020, District 13
Party	Candidate	Votes	%	±%
Republican	Sean Pouche	14,054	56.61%	+2.21
Democratic	Vic Abundis	10,774	43.39%	−2.21
Total votes		24,828	100.00%	

Missouri House of Representatives Election, November 8, 2022, District 13
Party	Candidate	Votes	%	±%
Republican	Sean Pouche	12,405	100.00%	+43.39
Total votes		12,405	100.00%	
