= After the Reign (band) =

American country music band

After The Reign
- Origin: New Jersey, U.S.
- Genre: Country
- Years active: 2006−present
- Label: Unsigned
- Members: Willie Kelly; John Strevens; Dave Hurley; Bob Grado; Clay Perlman; John Carretta
- Website: www.afterthereign.com

After The Reign is an American country music band composed of Willie Kelly (lead vocals), John Strevens (lead guitar, rhythm guitar, background vocals), Dave Hurley (bass guitar, background vocals), Clay Perlman (lead guitar, rhythm guitar), and Bob Grado (steel guitar, mandolin, banjo), John Carretta (drums).

The band originates from New Jersey, where they pull inspiration from for their music. The band has changed over many members with the two original members being Kelly and Burlett, who formed a band called Southern Reign in 1994. They later created After The Reign in 2006.

They released their first album Hillbilly Clubhouse in 2009 featuring the title track "Hillbilly Clubhouse" and "Burning Down the Farm" which reached No. 79 on the country music chart. In 2013 they released their second album Almost Famous including their hit single, "Jersey Strong".

== History ==
They formed in Monmouth County, New Jersey, United States, in 2006, although various members have played together in other bands for over 10 years. The band currently divides it's time between New Jersey and Nashville, Tennessee, but perform shows all over the country. They play a large repertoire of their own material written mainly by head songwriter Strevens, but also include collaborations with Kelly. 2010 saw the independent release of their debut album "Hillbilly Clubhouse" to critic’s raves with the title track receiving airplay both nationally and internationally. In 2012 "Burning Down The Farm" the 2nd single from that album stayed on the Music Row Charts for 32 weeks hitting #72. The single was also included on the Sony Music distributed compilation CD "Country Mix USA" pairing them alongside other country artists Craig Morgan, Due West, and Sammy Kershaw. Early 2013 the band participated in the Hard Rock Cafe's Hard Rock Rising competition, which was a worldwide battle of the bands that started with over 12.000 bands around the world. After The Reign won the New York City market, in which they represented the area in the competition. Over-all they ranked in the top 20 of the 12,000 bands. They released their sophomore album "Almost Famous" in the summer of 2013, produced by Marc Muller, mixed by Billy Decker, and mastered by Richard Dodd. Their single "Jersey Strong" featured on their second album has been named the official anthem of New Jersey by the organization Strong Than The Storm and was a feature point on Discovery's Destination American Red, White and You. It has put them in the national media spotlight, in which they completed a media tour in support of the song. In 2014 the band suffered a setback with the sudden death of longtime drummer Herb Van Note. For a moment the band was unsure if it could continue, but with the help of replacement drummer Greg Annunziata the band hit the road again in April 2014. 2014-2015 the band performed headlining theater shows in New Jersey and Virginia. In 2016 After The Reign was named a top 10 Best Bar Band At the Jersey Shore by 105.7 The Hawk's fan voted competition. In late 2016, drummer Greg Annunziata announced his departure from the band. Through the end of 2016 into 2017 the band searched for a new drummer. In February 2017 ATR welcomed John Carretta as the band's new drummer. The band also renewed their contract with Bar Anticipation for the 2017 year for the fifth year in a row.

=== Hillbilly Clubhouse ===
2009 saw the independent release of their debut CD Hillbilly Clubhouse to critical acclaim with the title track receiving airplay both nationally and internationally. In 2012 "Burning Down The Farm" the second single from that album stayed on the Music Row Charts for 32 weeks hitting No. 79 and was also included on the Sony Music distributed compilation CD Country Mix USA, pairing them alongside other country artists Craig Morgan, Due West, and Sammy Kershaw.

==== Track list ====
- Hillbilly Clubhouse"
- "January"
- "Burning Down The Farm"
- "Feel the Same Way Too"
- "Abilene"
- "Two Worlds Collide"
- "Ghost of Nashville"
- "Thinkin 'bout You"
- "Hillbilly Clubhouse" (acoustic)
- "Two Worlds Collide" (acoustic)
- "Abilene" (acoustic)

=== Hard Rock Rising ===
In early 2013, After The Reign participated in the Hard Rock Cafe's Hard Rock Rising competition, which was a worldwide battle of the bands that started with over 12,000 bands around the world. After The Reign won the New York City market, representing the area in the competition. Over-all they ranked in the top 20 of the 12,000 bands.

=== Almost Famous ===
In the summer of 2013 the band released their second album Almost Famous. The album was recorded by Marc Muller known for his work with Shania Twain. All 11 songs were written by Strevens with collaboration with Kelly on certain tracks. Almost Famous was produced by Muller and Strevens. The album was mixed in Nashville by Billy Decker who has worked with artists like Rodney Atkins, Sammy Kershaw, Chris Young and Trace Adkins and mastered by Richard Dodd who has mastered all of Jason Aldean's albums and singles, George Harrison, Tom Petty, and Steve Earle.

==== Track List ====
- "Old School"
- "Day On the Bay"
- "You Started a Fire"
- "Almost Famous"
- "Soldier Song"
- "Jersey Strong"
- "Take One for the Team"
- "Don't Tell Me to Go to Hell (I'm Already Here)"
- "Redneck Nation"
- "That Ain't How I Roll"
- "Music Row"

=== "Jersey Strong" ===
Their single "Jersey Strong" was written by Strevens while he had no power in the wake of Hurricane Sandy in October 2012. It has become a crowd favorite and a staple in every show. It has been named the official anthem of New Jersey by the organization Strong Than The Storm and was a feature point on Discovery's Destination America Red, White and You. It has put them in the national media spotlight, in which they are currently doing a media tour in support of the song.

== Awards and recognition ==
- Hard Rock Cafe Hard Rock Rising New York Market winners
- Stronger Than The Storm Summer Sound-off winners - Jersey Strong
- Monmouth County Freeholders "After The Reign Day"

== Discography ==
=== Studio albums ===
Title	Album details	Peak chart positions	
Title	Album details	US Country	US
Hillbilly Clubhouse	Release date: 2009; Label: After The Reign Records; Formats: CD, Music Download	—	—
Almost Famous	Release date: 2013; Label: After The Reign Records; Formats: CD, Music Download	—	—

=== Singles ===
Title	Year	Music Row Chart	Album
Hillbilly Clubhouse	2009	-	Hillbilly Clubhouse
Burning Down The Farm	2009	79	Hillbilly Clubhouse
Day On The Bay	2011	-	Almost Famous
Jersey Strong	2012	-	Almost Famous
Old School	2012	-	Almost Famous
Take One For The Team	2013	-	Almost Famous
