= King Niko =

American indie rock band

- Origin: Salt Lake City, Utah
- Genres: Indie rock, alternative rock, electropop
- Years active: 2009–present
- Label: King Niko Records
- Members: Benjamin Moffat; Ransom Wydner; Dago Marino; Whil McCutchan; Reid Laitinen
- Past members: Andrew Sullivan; Nate Leslie; Timothy Rawcliffe; Zachary Sloan
- Website: www.kingniko.com

King Niko is an indie rock band from Salt Lake City, Utah, composed of Benjamin Moffat (guitar), Ransom Wydner (vocals), Timothy Rawcliffe (bass), Zachary Sloan (drums) and Reid Laitinen (keys). King Niko has played with bands like Loverboy, Rooney, Say Anything, Thirty Seconds to Mars, Switchfoot, Anberlin, Grouplove, Neon Trees and Panic! at the Disco.

== History ==
King Niko first got together in April 2009 when guitarist Benjamin Moffat decided he wanted to start a dance-rock band that would "make chicks dance." Moffat recruited fellow Salt Lake City musicians Tim Rawcliffe and Zachary Sloan, with whom he had played in other bands, and Ransom Wydner who he knew through a relative. After their first practice, the band decided that they wanted a more modern feel and brought on Andrew Sullivan to play keys.

King Niko's first performance was May 20, 2009. Their first EP, "Gorgeous and Gory," was recorded in August 2009 and released in October 2009. The song "Katrina Sleepover" became popular on Salt Lake City's largest rock radio station, X96, and the band was offered an opening spot for Say Anything and 30 Seconds to Mars that November.

King Niko played a number of high-profile shows in 2010 before recording their second release, "The French Accent EP," which experienced similar radio success and was well-reviewed by local media. In August 2010, Andrew Sullivan decided to leave the band and was replaced on keys by Reid Laitinen.

In February 2011 King Niko was named the 2011 City Weekly Music Awards Band of The Year by Salt Lake City Weekly. This title got the attention of Rockfish Records who offered King Niko a recording and distribution deal for their song "Intentions" as part of a promotion agreement. "Intentions" is the band's most successful song to date in terms of radio play, prompting King Niko and Rockfish Records to decide to continue recording together. In June 2011, King Niko began touring the Western United States. In October 2011 King Niko performed for an estimated 8,000 attendees of the 2011 X96 Big Ass Show with Panic! at the Disco, Neon Trees, Anberlin, Switchfoot, The Airborne Toxic Event, She Wants Revenge, Grouplove, Sleeper Agent and locals The Suicycles and Brogan Kelby. With Panic! at the Disco's vocalist Brendon Urie hospitalized, King Niko front man Ransom Wydner joined Tyler Glenn of Neon Trees on stage as guest vocalists.

== Discography ==
- Gorgeous and Gory
1. Survival
2. Tippy Toes
3. Wildfire
4. Casualty
5. Soul Sister
6. Katrina Sleepover
- The French Accent EP
1. Kink
2. The Comedown
3. French Accent
- "Intentions (Single)"
1. Intentions
