= John Elliott (Missouri politician) =

American politician

Member-elect of the Missouri House of Representatives from the 13th district
- Assuming office January 6, 2027
- Succeeding: Sean Pouche

Personal details
- Party: Republican

John Elliott is an American politician of the Missouri Republican Party who is the representative-elect for the 13th district in the Missouri House of Representatives. He was elected in the 2026 general election. He is a former Platte County Commissioner.
