= Nick Marshall (politician) =

American politician

Member of the Missouri House of Representatives from the 13th district
- In office 2011–2019
- Succeeded by: Vic Allred

Personal details
- Party: Republican
- Education: Bob Jones University; University of Missouri–Kansas City

Nick Marshall is an American politician. He was member of the Missouri House of Representatives for the 13th district.
