= Fictionist (EP) =

EP by Fictionist
- Released: October 18, 2011
- Recorded: June Audio Recording Studios
- Genre: Alternative, progressive rock, new wave
- Length: 24:01
- Label: Atlantic Records
- Producer: Fictionist

Fictionist chronology
Lasting Echo (2010)	Fictionist (2011)

Fictionist is an EP and the debut major label recording by rock group Fictionist, released digitally on October 18, 2011, in the United States. It was recorded at June Audio Recording Studios and engineered by Scott Wiley (Neon Trees, Elvis Costello). All songs were written and produced by Fictionist.

== Track listing ==
No.	Title	Writer(s)	Producer(s)	Length
1.	"Swept Away"	Fictionist	Fictionist	4:50
2.	"The Real Thing"	Fictionist	Fictionist	4:18
3.	"Silver Girl"	Fictionist	Fictionist	3:57
4.	"Figure In The Fog"	Fictionist	Fictionist	1:26
5.	"Great Escape"	Fictionist	Fictionist	4:17
6.	"Distraction"	Fictionist	Fictionist	5:12
Total length:				24:01

== Release history ==
Region	Date	Format	Label
United States	October 11, 2011	Digital download, CD	Atlantic Records
