= Truman Brothers =

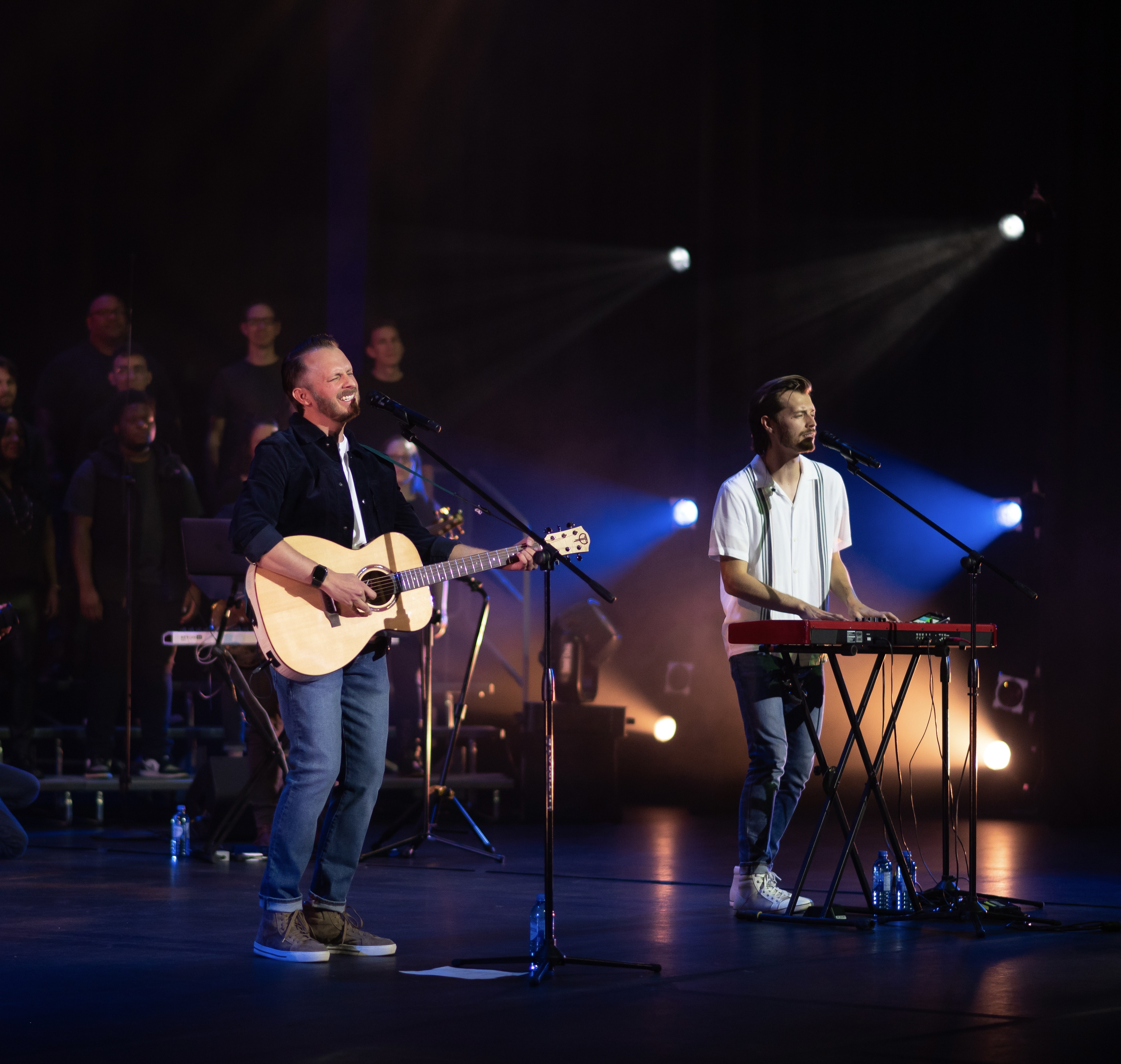
- Truman Brothers in 2022

Background information
- Origin: Nashville, TN, U.S.
- Genres: Pop; Rock; Christian rock
- Years active: 2005–present
- Label: Shadow Mountain Records
- Members: Ben Truman; Chad Truman
- Website: trumanbrothers.com

Truman Brothers is an American pop/rock Christian duo composed of brothers Ben and Chad Truman from Nashville, Tennessee. The band was formed in Provo, Utah in 2005 while the brothers were attending Brigham Young University.

In 2019, the duo was signed to Shadow Mountain Records in Salt Lake City. Their EP, Quiet Revolution, was subsequently released in 2021, debuting at #10 on the iTunes Christian Albums chart. The album led the duo to winning the Praiseworthy Award for Best Original Religious Song ("Before the Calm"). and Best Music Video ("Higher").

The brothers released a follow-up EP, Face the Fire, in 2022. The lead single, "Oh Child", would go on to win the Praiseworthy Award for Best Original Religious Song. The duo's first ever Christmas album, The Sounding Joy, is scheduled for release on November 8, 2023.

In addition to their work as a duo, the brothers are also members of the Nashville Tribute Band.

Ben and Chad are the sons of Diamond Rio musician Dan Truman.

== History ==
=== 2005-2012: Early years in Provo ===
As students at Brigham Young University, Ben and Chad began writing songs together for the first time. Taking advantage of the Provo music scene, they developed a following by performing their original material on campus and at local music venues. They were one of the first acts to ever perform at Velour Live Music Gallery.

In 2006 they won BYU's campus-wide Battle of the Bands as voted by the students. They became back-to-back champions by winning it again in 2007.

The duo released their first album, Hold On To Love, on June 12, 2009, a day after opening for Kelly Clarkson at Utah Valley University alongside fellow Provo band, Imagine Dragons.

Building on the momentum they gained in Provo, the brothers signed with a national booking agency and began touring colleges and universities across the United States on the NACA circuit.

The brothers released their sophomore album, Somewhere Between, on April 13, 2012.

=== 2013–2018: Back in Nashville ===
In 2013, Ben and Chad moved home to Tennessee to further pursue their career in music. They began working closely with the Nashville Tribute Band, a collection of Nashville-based musicians that specializes in making contemporary music for Latter-day Saint audiences.

Nashville Tribute Band began featuring the Truman Brothers extensively on their studio recordings, including the acclaimed album, Redeemer, which debuted at #11 on the Billboard Christian Albums chart in November 2014.

In the years that followed the Truman Brothers performed as members of the Nashville Tribute Band at hundreds of shows across the United States, as well as tours in England and China.

In 2018, Ben and Chad wrote the song "Unbelief" which was released as a single from Nashville Tribute Band's album, The Word. The song and accompanying music video kickstarted a new chapter in the duo's history.

=== 2019–Present: Signing and return to Utah ===
In 2019, the Truman Brothers returned to Utah and signed a record deal with Shadow Mountain Records in Salt Lake City. They enlisted Grammy-nominated musician Nate Pyfer as their producer and began recording at June Audio in Provo, UT.

Their album, Quiet Revolution, was released in 2021, debuting at #10 on the iTunes Christian Albums chart. In 2022, they won the Praiseworthy Award for Best Original Religious Song for "Before the Calm". The song "Higher" later won the Praiseworthy Award for Best Music Video.

The brothers released a follow-up album, Face the Fire, on August 31, 2022, celebrating with a sold-out show at the Covey Center for the Arts in Provo. The album's lead single, "Oh Child", would go on to win the Praiseworthy Award for Best Original Religious Song.

In 2023, the duo released an original a cappella song called "Breathe", a collaboration with the award-winning female group, Noteworthy, from Brigham Young University. The duo was a featured performer at the Gather Together YSA Conference organized by The Church of Jesus Christ of Latter-day Saints on August 19, 2023.

== Discography ==
- Hold On To Love (2009)
- Somewhere Between (2012)
- Dukes of Delmont (2017)
- Quiet Revolution (2021)
- Face the Fire (2022)
- The Sounding Joy (2023)

=== Music videos ===
Year	Video	Director
2019	"Unbelief" (with Nashville Tribute Band)	Cameron Gade
2021	"Before the Calm"	Cameron Gade
2022	"Higher"	Cameron Gade
2022	"Oh Child"	Trevor Free
2022	"The Day Dawn Is Breaking"	Trevor Free
2022	"The First Noel" (with Madilyn Paige)	Trevor Free
2023	"Breathe" (with Noteworthy)	Nick Sales
2023	"Thank You"	Trevor Free
2024	"God Blessed Us, Everyone"	Trevor Free

== Awards and nominations ==
=== Praiseworthy Awards ===
Year	Nominee / work	Award	Result
2022	"Before the Calm"	Best Original Song	Won
2023	"Higher"	Best Music Video	Won
2023	"Oh Child"	Best Original Song	Won
2024	"Breathe"	Best Music Video	Nominated
2024	"Hark, The Herald Angels Sing"	Best Religious Cover	Nominated
2025	"God Blessed Us, Everyone"	Best Music Video	Won
2026	"Give Me This Mountain"	Best Music Video	Nominated
