= Jersey Strong (song) =

Single by After The Reign

from the album Almost Famous
- Released: December 21, 2012
- Genre: Country
- Length: 3:29
- Label: Unsigned
- Songwriter(s): John Strevens
- Producer(s): Mark Muller; John Strevens

After The Reign singles chronology
"Day On The Bay" (2011)	"Jersey Strong" (2012)	"You Started a Fire" (2013)

Music video
- "Jersey Strong" on YouTube

Jersey Strong is the second single off country music band After The Reign second album Almost Famous. The song was written by John Strevens songwriter lead guitar and background vocals for the band October 2012. After The Reign released the single December 2012 as a digital music download then later as a CD single in the Spring of 2013.

== Content ==
Jersey Strong starts off by describing the devastation that many faced after Hurricane Sandy. The song continues to talk about the recovery and rebuilding that many states face after the storm, mostly focusing on New Jersey and the Jersey Shore. The over all theme is resilience, hope, and strength. The song was written by Strevens in the wake of the storm.

== Critical reception ==
Jersey Strong was named Stronger Than The Storm Summer Sound-Off song of New Jersey Through this they did a media tour promoting the song and the Stronger Than The Storm efforts to rebuild the Jersey Shore. It has received airplay in the New York City, Philadelphia, Nashville, and New Jersey radio markets. New Jersey 101.5 wrote "The song has the distinct possibility of becoming an anthem for the Jersey Shore going forward." In an article for CBS Local in New York City a boardwalk construction worker was quoted "'Jersey Strong' captures the Jersey Shore’s struggle after Sandy. It’s a great song. It doesn’t matter what type of band they are.” he said. “They hit it on the nose.”
