= Nashville Tribute Band =

The Nashville Tribute Band is a Nashville-based Christian group founded by Jason Deere and Dan Truman, the pianist of the popular country group Diamond Rio.

== Background ==
In 2003, songwriter and record producer Jason Deere began teaching the Old and New Testament in an early morning seminary class for high school students of the Church of Jesus Christ of Latter-day Saints (LDS Church) in Franklin, Tennessee. His research and teaching inspired him to write an album of songs about the early church history, from 1820 to 1844. The album Joseph: A Nashville Tribute to the Prophet was co-produced with Deere's longtime friend, Dan Truman, of Diamond Rio. Truman also wrote one of the songs on the album. The album was released by Deseret Book’s Highway Records in 2005 and it became one of its best-selling albums, winning Pearl Awards for Contemporary Album Of The Year, Inspirational Recording Of The Year (Emma), Contemporary Instrumental Recorded Song Of The Year (Say Uncle), Songwriter Of The Year (Jason Deere). The LDS Booksellers Association also awarded the album a 2006 Listener's Choice Award for Album Of The Year and awarded Deere a 2006 Listener's Choice Award for Best New Artist.

Deere and Truman co-produced a second Nashville Tribute album released in 2007 called Trek: A Nashville Tribute to the Pioneers. The album covered the Mormon pioneer era of LDS Church history. The album won the 2007 Pearl Award for Group Recording Artist Of The Year (Jason Deere, The Nashville Tribute Band) as well as the 2008 Pearl Award for Inspirational Instrumental Recording Of The Year (My People/Come, Come Ye Saints).

Years of touring the world with the Nashville Tribute Band, along with Deere and Truman's own experience serving as LDS Church missionaries, led to the writing and production of the album The Work: A Nashville Tribute to the Missionaries. The album pays tribute to the culture of sending thousands of missionaries into the world and all of the experiences associated with the missionaries, their families and friends as they serve.

== Discography ==
- Joseph: A Nashville Tribute To The Prophet (2005; Deere Records)
- Trek: A Nashville Tribute To The Pioneers (2007; Deere Records)
- The Work: A Nashville Tribute To The Missionaries (2011; Deere Records)
- Redeemer: A Nashville Tribute To Jesus Christ (2014; Shadow Mountain Records)
- Merry: A Nashville Tribute to Christmas (2016; Shadow Mountain Records)
- The Word: A Nashville Tribute to The Bible (2018; Shadow Mountain Records)
- Praise: A Nashville Tribute to The Hymns (2020; Shadow Mountain Records)
- Don't Miss This in the Doctrine and Covenants, soundtrack (2020; Shadow Mountain Records)

== Band members ==
The Nashville Tribute Band consists of:

- Jason Deere
- Dan Truman of Diamond Rio
- Brad Hull of Due West
- Tim Gates of Due West
- Ben Truman of the Truman Brothers
- Chad Truman of the Truman Brothers
