= Vic Allred =

American politician (1962–2025)

Member of the Missouri House of Representatives from the 13th district
- In office 2019–2021
- Preceded by: Nick Marshall
- Succeeded by: Sean Pouche

Personal details
- Born: August 7, 1962 Denver, Colorado, U.S.
- Died: April 12, 2025 (aged 62)
- Party: Republican
- Spouse: L. Lynnette Allred
- Children: 4

Victor Bennett Allred (August 7, 1962 – April 12, 2025) was an American politician who served as a member of the Missouri House of Representatives from 2019 to 2021. He was a member of the Republican party. Allred was born in Denver, Colorado on August 7, 1962, and died on April 12, 2025, at the age of 62.
