= Allred, Nevada =

Allred
- Ghost town
- Location in the United States Allred (the United States)
- Coordinates: 38°40′42″N 115°32′55″W
- Country: United States
- State: Nevada
- Counties: Nye
- Elevation: 4,846 ft (1,477 m)

Population
  - Total: 0

Allred is a ghost town situated in Nye County, Nevada. A post office in the settlement opened on April 17, 1911 with Allen Oxborrow and George Kump as postmasters. The post office was closed more than a year later on October 31, 1912. There are no visible remains left of Allred.
