= Ben Sheppard (Australian sportsman) =

Australian sportsman (1890–1931)

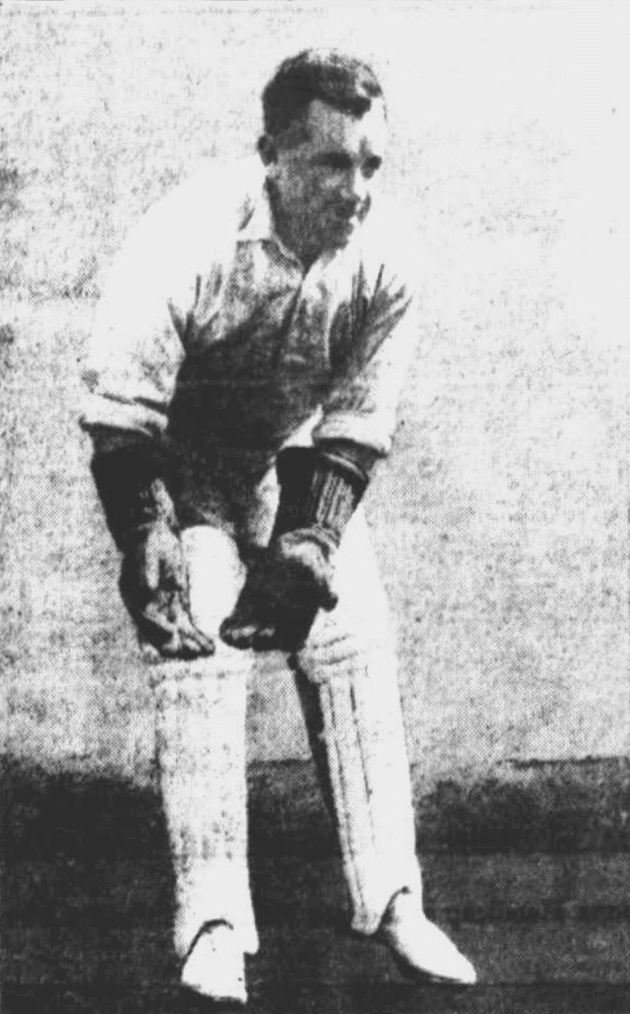

Personal information
- Full name: Benjamin Joseph Sheppard
- Born: 23 June 1890; Fitzroy, Victoria
- Died: 9 September 1931 (aged 41); Fitzroy, Victoria
- Original team: Xavier College

Playing career^{1}
| Years | Club | Games (Goals) |
| 1911 | Melbourne | 4 (1) |
| 1912 | Richmond | 1 (1) |
| Total | | 5 (2) |
- ^{1} Playing statistics correct to the end of 1912.

Benjamin Joseph Sheppard (23 June 1890 – 9 September 1931) was an Australian sportsman who played first-class cricket for Victoria and Australian rules football with Melbourne and Richmond in the Victorian Football League (VFL).

Sheppard started out as a footballer at Xavier College before being recruited by Melbourne. He played four senior games with Melbourne in the 1911 VFL season and one for Richmond in 1912.

In 1914 he appeared in two first-class cricket matches for Victoria during a tour of Tasmania. A wicket-keeper, his highest score was 30, which he made at Launceston.

== See also ==
- List of Victoria first-class cricketers
