= The American Dollar (band) =

American post-rock band

- Origin: Queens, New York, United States
- Genres: Post-rock, ambient, electronic
- Years active: 2005 – present
- Label: Yesh Music
- Members: John Emanuele (drums, keyboards); Richard Cupolo (guitar, keyboards)
- Website: www.theamericandollar.info

The American Dollar is an American post-rock band, formed in 2005 in Queens, New York. The band consists of drummer/keyboardist John Emanuele and guitarist/keyboardist/producer Richard Cupolo.

== History ==
The American Dollar has released five studio albums, three remix albums and two EPs, either on independent labels or via their own Yesh Music imprint. Their debut self-titled effort was released in 2006. A Memory Stream, the band's third full-length, was issued in 2008. Their fourth album, entitled Atlas, was released by Yesh Music on January 1, 2010. The American Dollar's fifth full-length album, Awake In The City, was released on March 24, 2012. The band has toured America, Europe and Canada. Their album Across the Oceans was February 2016 album of the month on the eclectic NPR radio program "Echoes."

Their music has been featured in TV shows including CSI: Miami and MLB Network specials, and film trailers such as Extremely Loud and Incredibly Close and Up in the Air.

== Copyright lawsuits ==
In 2011 the band brought a copyright infringement lawsuit against Lakewood Church and Joel and Victoria Osteen for $3 million. There had originally been a licensing agreement for use of the song "Signaling Through the Flames" on DVDs and television broadcasts, but the dispute concerned if the Osteens and their church had violated the agreement. Charges against the Osteens were dismissed, but the judge allowed the possibility of plaintiffs the option of amending their suit and continuing.

In 2016, the band sued Google, Tidal and Microsoft for alleged infringement relating to the payment of streaming royalties, with Microsoft settling out of court. In response to the band's claims they are owed $5 million, a Tidal spokesperson claimed "They are misinformed as to who, if anyone, owes royalty payments to them".

== Discography ==
Studio albums

- The American Dollar (February 2006)
- The Technicolour Sleep (April 2007)
- A Memory Stream (July 2008)
- Atlas (January 2010)
- Awake in the City (March 2012)
- Across the Oceans (December 2015)
- You're Listening (August 2018)
- Lofi Dimensions (April 2020)
- Lofi Dimensions 2 (August 2020)

Compilations

- Ambient One (June 2009)
- Ambient Two (June 2010)
- Free Winter 2010 (December 2010)
- Ambient Three (September 2012)
- Free Winter 2012 (December 2012)
- Music for Sleep (December 2012)
- Music For Focus and Creativity (December 2013)
- Five Album Set & Bonus EPs (May 2014)
- Music for Chilling Out (May 2017)
- Music for Travel (November 2018)
- Music for Workouts (April 2019)
- Music for Adventure (May 2019)

EPs

- From The Inland Sea - Split EP with Arms & Sleepers (December 2009)
- Sleep Sequences, Vol. 1 (June 2019)
- Cosmic Wave (September 2020)
- Blaze (July 2021)

Live albums

- Live In Brooklyn (August 2010)

== See also ==
- List of ambient music artists
