= Due West (band) =

American country music group

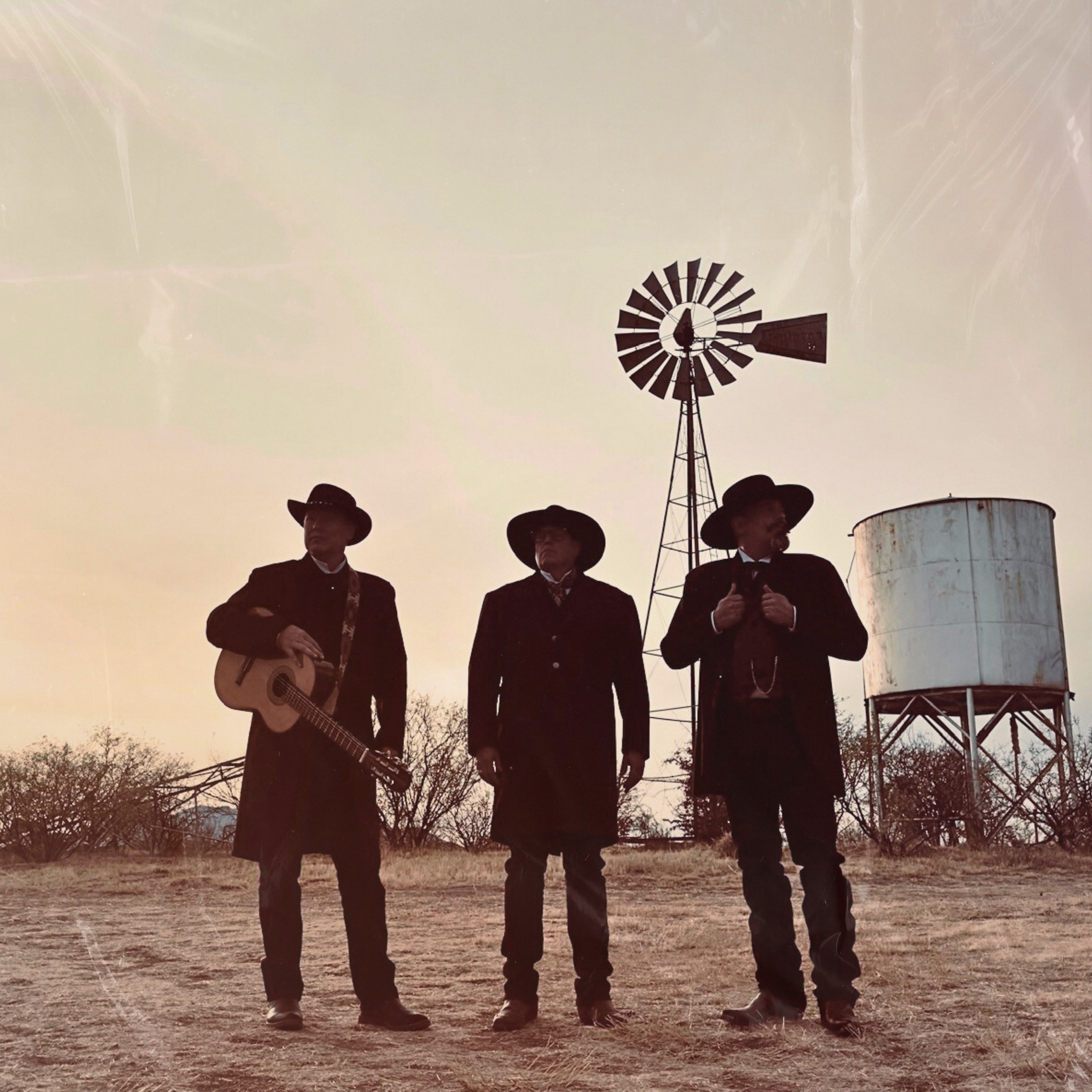

Background information
- Origin: Nashville, Tennessee, United States
- Genres: Country
- Years active: 2004-present
- Labels: Bigger Than Me; Black River; Sovereign 3 Unwound
- Members: Tim Gates; Brad Hull; Matthew Lopez

Due West is an American country music group from Nashville, Tennessee. The group consists of Tim Gates (lead vocals), Brad Hull (harmony vocals, guitar), and Matthew Lopez (harmony vocals, guitar). Due West has released two full-length studio albums, several EPs, and five singles including "Things You Can't Do in a Car", which charted at number 47 on Billboard Hot Country Songs. Members of Due West have also written songs for Bucky Covington and Lady Antebellum.

== Biography ==
Due West was formed in Nashville, Tennessee, in 2004. Singer-songwriters Tim Gates, Brad Hull, and Matthew Lopez— respectively natives of Richfield, Utah, Thatcher, Arizona, and Wolf, Wyoming— met in 2004 when they were invited by Diamond Rio member Dan Truman to attend a party at his sister's house. The three began performing and writing songs together soon afterward, as they noticed common interests in bands such as Shenandoah and McBride & the Ride. In 2009, the band independently formed the Bigger Than Me label and released their debut single "I Get That All the Time".

In 2010, Due West was signed to Black River Entertainment. Soon after, they released a self-titled, six-song EP. Don Chance of the Times Record News rated the album "C", as he thought the songs were well-written and produced but lacking in artistic identity. Also released on Black River were the singles "The Bible and the Belt" and "When the Smoke Clears". Kevin John Coyne of Country Universe rated "The Bible and the Belt" an "F", criticizing its lyrical content for advocating child beatings. Roughstock reviewer Matt Bjorke rated Forget the Miles four stars out of five, praising the band's lyrical content and finding their vocal harmony comparable to Restless Heart.'

Their next release for Black River was "Things You Can't Do in a Car" in 2012. The song became the band's first entry on the Billboard Hot Country Songs charts. It was included on their second Black River EP Our Time, produced by Garth Fundis. Due West promoted the project by touring at various radio stations across the United States. "Things You Can't Do in a Car" spent 18 weeks on Hot Country Songs and peaked at number 47. The group made their first performance on the Grand Ole Opry in September 2012.

After leaving Black River Entertainment, they independently released the EP Move Like That, which they funded through Kickstarter. This project charted on Billboard Top Country Albums upon release. The album includes the single "Slide On Over".

The trio continued to record through the 2010s and 2020s, and in 2024, they signed with Unwound Records, an independent label founded by songwriter Dean Dillon. Due West had previously collaborated with Dillon on the track "I Just Wanna Go There" from Move Like That. Soon afterward, the trio released an album titled Unbroken.

== Work with other artists ==
Gates, Hull, and Lopez have also performed as part of the Nashville Tribute Band, along with Truman and Jason Deere. Lopez and Deere co-wrote "Love's Looking Good on You" for Lady Antebellum. Bucky Covington also released "The Bible and the Belt" on his self-titled debut album.

== Musical styles ==
Due West's sound features three-part vocal harmony. Tim Gates sings lead vocals, while Matt Lopez sings baritone harmony and Brad Hull sings tenor harmony, with the latter two also contributing on guitar.

== Discography ==
=== Studio albums ===
Title	Details	Peak chart positions	
Title	Details	US Country	US Heat
Due West	Release date: April 27, 2010; Label: Bigger Than Me	—	—
Forget the Miles	Release date: February 15, 2011; Label: Black River Entertainment	—	—
Our Time	Release date: 2012; Label: Black River Entertainment	—	—
Move Like That	Release date: August 27, 2013; Label: Sovereign 3 Records	38	13
I Hear Christmas	Release date: November 26, 2013; Label: Refinement Records	—	—
Unbroken	Release date: February 23, 2024; Label: Unwound Records	_	_
"—" denotes releases that did not chart

=== Singles ===
Year	Single	Peak positions	Album
Year	Single	US Country	Album
2009	"I Get That All the Time"	—	Due West
2010	"The Bible and the Belt"	—	Due West
2011	"When the Smoke Clears"	—	Forget the Miles
2012	"Things You Can't Do in a Car"	47	Our Time
2013	"Slide On Over"	—	Move Like That
"—" denotes releases that did not chart

=== Music videos ===
Year	Video	Director
2009	"I Get That All the Time"	Glenn Sweitzer
2011	"When the Smoke Clears"	Roman White
2012	"Things You Can't Do in a Car"	Robert Chavers
