= Bloom Institute of Technology =

For-profit online coding bootcamp

Bloom Institute of Technology, also known as BloomTech, is a coding bootcamp providing for-profit massive online course. Launched in 2017 under the name Lambda School, it gained attention for being a coding bootcamp that offered income share agreements as a method of financing. During this time, it deceived students about costs, made false claims about graduates’ hiring rates, and engaged in illegal lending. Following several layoffs and cost-cutting measures, it transitioned from a bootcamp model to MOOC, and refocused on traditional student loans.

== History ==
BloomTech was founded by Austen Allred and Ben Nelson in 2017 as Lambda School. Nelson was an instructor for the code bootcamp DevMountain, and Allred was a manager at the payday loan company LendUp. BloomTech began as a single short course in functional programming. The previous name Lambda refers to lambda functions, a concept in functional programming.

BloomTech joined Y Combinator in 2017, and raised seed capital in 2018 from Ashton Kutcher's Sound Ventures, Gmail creator Paul Bucheit, and Zynga co-founder Justin Waldron. In January 2019, investors including Google Ventures, Y Combinator, and Ashton Kutcher placed $30 million in BloomTech investments. Enrollment was 700 in October 2018 and 2,700 in late-August 2019, at which point enrollment was expanding by 10 percent a month. By 2019, the curriculum had expanded to a full nine-month course, longer than most comparable bootcamps.

As of February 2020, over $48 million in venture funding had been raised and the school was valued at $150 million. However, that April, the company announced a layoff of 19 employees, explaining the decision as an effort to focus. In August 2020, the company raised a $74 million Series C. In April 2021, the company laid off 65 employees.

In November 2021, the company rebranded as BloomTech.

In December 2022, the company laid off 88 employees, half of its staff at the time. In December 2023, the company once more laid off 50% of staff, removing all full time instructors.

== Funding and payment model ==
BloomTech gained early notoriety for its income share agreement (ISA) model. Rather than pay tuition up front, students agreed to pay a percentage of future income after acquiring employment. The specifics of its payment structured have changed over time. In its early years, students paid 17% of income after acquiring a job that pays over $50,000 in the technology field, ending after either $30,000 or 24 months of 17% payments, or after 5 years without a job in the technology sector.

However, BloomTech sold a portion of ISAs to third-parties before the students obtained jobs. As of August 2018, they sold half of their ISAs to a hedge fund for $10,000 each. In December 2019, the company partnered with Edly, a digital marketplace for accredited investors to trade ISAs. In 2020, BloomTech removed all statements about this partnership from their website.

In November 2021, following layoffs and cost-cutting measures, the ISA terms significantly changed. Students paid $2,950 upfront, and once they make $50,000 in any job (including outside the field of technology) they paid 14% of their income for four years. The ISA cap was raised to $42,950, with the contracts lasting up to eight years.

At the same time of those ISA changes, BloomTech began offering straightforward loans at 12.5% interest. The company marketed it alongside a "Tuition Refund Guarantee," saying students could receive 110% of their tuition if they did not receive a job offer for $50K or more per year within a year of graduating. However, the offer drew criticism in the tech community for its onerous requirements: a graduate must apply to ten jobs every week, and make five open source code contributions every week, for one year.

== Controversies ==
In May 2021, three former students brought suits against the company for a number of misrepresentations, including operating illegally without informing students, and misrepresenting their job placement rates. In April 2022, another former student filed a lawsuit for the same misrepresentations, this time adding Allred as a defendant. In March 2023, a class action lawsuit was filed against the company, Allred, and unnamed officers and directors.

In April 2024, the US Consumer Financial Protection Bureau fined the company $64,000 and the CEO $100,000 for deceptive practices. In addition, the CFPB released students from their income share agreements, and banned both the company and Allred from consumer lending activities.

=== Job placement rates ===
The school has been accused of dramatically misrepresenting job placement rates. On August 2, 2018, the company announced, "every single Lambda School graduate who has been on the job market for six months is either employed in a full-time role as a software engineer or has joined an early startup working for equity." The following day, the executive team reprimanded staff for poor placement rates, citing a class where only one-third of students found jobs six months after graduation.

In late 2019, the company claimed, "86% of [BloomTech] graduates are hired within 6 months, and make over $50k a year." However, a leaked memo to investors in May 2019 said, "We’re at roughly 50% placement for cohorts that are 6 months graduated." Shortly after the news about the discrepancy, the company published their own outcomes report, claiming 71% job placement. However, they arrived at that number by removing the "$50k a year" qualifier, and not including students who they claim are not job seeking.

In February 2021 BloomTech leaders informed all staff that "qualified job placements" (those making $50,000) were 27% at six months post graduation. When the slides from the presentation leaked in 2021, a representative said that those numbers were inaccurate, but could not explain why the COO would present inaccurate numbers to the entire company at an all-hands meeting.

In 2022 BloomTech released their 2021 outcomes report. The report claimed a 90% placement rate for graduates, and a $65,000 median salary for graduates in their first job after graduation. However, the company reached those numbers through omissions such as not counting 37% of graduates in the total, claiming they are not job seeking.

=== Quality of education ===
In 2019, Business Insider reported on students who found the training fell far short of promises. They found the curriculum incomplete, requiring outside resources and considerable self-teaching to complete the program. While the marketing promised "World-Class Instructional Staff" with instructors from Google and Apple, instructors had little real-world experience, often themselves having graduated from other bootcamps. For example, the data science class was taught by the CEO's brother, whose only experience was graduating from a web development bootcamp and attending an internship at a small company in Utah.

Student concerns were brushed off or ignored, with students made to feel that they were the problem. Some compared the program to a cult, with staff on Slack encouraging students to respond to critical social media posts with positive testimonials. Students worried about retaliation for any criticism, such as being removed from the program or blacklisted by partner companies.

In late 2019, BloomTech launched a User Experience track to poor results. In the first cohort, only a single student graduated. In the following cohort, the students complained to the staff about haphazard, poorly organized instruction. Staff denied there were any issues for several months, telling students, "Trust the process." Following reporting by The Verge, the company shut down the UX track.

In November 2020, the program underwent drastic changes. The length was shortened from nine months to six, and Team Leads (paid staff analogous to Teaching Assistants) were removed from the program. In the new system, students in later units would fill that role for those in earlier units, and homework would automatically be graded via software. Students complained they would go weeks without feedback, and could skip lectures and projects without consequences.

=== Illegal operation ===
According to California Education Code, all private postsecondary schools (such as BloomTech) must register with the state and wait for approval before operation. This allows the state to act on student complaints, and periodically review a school's curriculum and marketing material. Should a school operate illegally, then any loans or other debt the school may claim against students is unenforceable.

For its first two years, BloomTech did not seek any form of approval and operated illegally. In March 2019, California's BPPE consumer protection bureau fined BloomTech $75,000, and ordered them to cease operations. The company continued to operate illegally through August 2020, when it was approved for operation after agreeing to not offer income share agreements in the state.

During this period, the state of California had no authority to act on student complaints. "We only have jurisdiction over approved schools. Therefore, any complaints students may wish to file with the Bureau will fall outside the Bureau's jurisdiction because Lambda School was not approved at the time of their enrollment."

While California law implies that any students who attended BloomTech prior to August 2020 owe the company nothing, BloomTech continues to enforce their income share agreements. The debate is an ongoing matter in arbitration, as the company requires that students sign arbitration agreements as part of enrollment.

=== Labor law violations ===
In Fall of 2020, the company piloted a program called "Lambda Fellows" where, as part of their training, students would spend several weeks working at a company without compensation. Afterwards, the company could elect to either hire the student (thereby paying BloomTech via its ISA) or decline and pay nothing. BloomTech marketed the product to companies with, "Try out our talented engineers risk free for 4 weeks." At launch, its FAQ explained, "Is this a paid program? This program is part of Lambda School for the Fellow and as such, is not paid." Paul Graham, an early investor, said, "Imagine how much easier hiring decisions would become if you could try out a programmer for four weeks before hiring them."

The program was publicly announced in November 2020. It was immediately criticized as unethical if not illegal under the Fair Labor Standards Act. Following the extremely negative reception, the program was changed to pay interns.

=== Misrepresenting debt ===
In April 2021, California's Department of Financial Protection and Innovation reached a settlement with BloomTech over misrepresenting the type of debt students were entering. The contracts stated, "this extension of credit is a qualified educational loan and is subject to the limitations on dischargeability in bankruptcy contained in Section 523(a)(8) of the United States Bankruptcy Code." This was false, and lead students to believe that it was impossible to discharge their debt.

As part of the settlement, the company was required to notify students of the inaccuracy, hire a third party to review its contracts for accuracy, and undergo a review of existing marketing material. The company issued their own press release on the settlement, which the DFPI determined to be deceptive. "DFPI asked Lambda to correct the mischaracterization in the blog post, and Lambda agreed. However, because the misleading blog post contradicts the consent order and Lambda’s agreement to ensure its marketing is accurate and not likely to mislead consumers, DFPI urges consumers to exercise caution when evaluating marketing and contracts for financial products and services offered by Lambda."

=== Leadership ===
Between leaving his previous startup and launching BloomTech, Allred co-wrote Secret Sauce: The Ultimate Growth Hacking Guide, which described strategies for SEO, content marketing, landing pages, and gaining followers on social media. In Exploiting Twitter for User Acquisition, an excerpt from his book, he recommends using tools that auto-follow strangers. "Let’s say you have a 10% follow-back rate (a pretty crappy one in my experience). That’s 100 new followers per day; 3,000 followers per month; 36,500 followers per year. It’s not pretty, but it works. What could your startup do with 3,000 interested Twitter followers? How quickly could you turn those 3,000 followers into users?" At the time of BloomTech's launch in 2017, Allred had amassed over 50,000 followers.

Allred has been accused of deceptive practices such as cherry picking. When asked about the number of students hired from BloomTech's UX program he tweeted, "Hit 100% hired but was VERY small sample size," but internal communication revealed that only a single student in the program had graduated.

=== Rebranding ===
In 2019, the AI infrastructure company Lambda Labs brought a trademark lawsuit against BloomTech, then "Lambda School." Labs alleged that the name caused confusion, and it may be harmed by the controversies surrounding BloomTech's business. As the case continued, Labs argued that BloomTech's 2020 controversies damaged the goodwill of the "Lambda" name, by virtue of the negative press. In July 2021, the two parties reached an undisclosed settlement.

That November, BloomTech announced its new name, along with changes to its financing options. Journalists noted the rebrand made sense in lieu of its new emphasis on loans, but the new name could also distance the company from previous controversies. "The name change could thus shake off some of the baggage the bootcamp has been holding onto (and help it attract more students)."
