= Swim Team (Arms and Sleepers album) =

Studio album by Arms and Sleepers
- Released: 28 October 2014
- Genre: Ambient, trip hop
- Length: 34:40
- Label: Fake Chapter Records

Swim Team is Arms and Sleepers fifth studio album and the third release under Fake Chapter Records. It was released on 28 October 2014. The first single was Hurry Slowly, followed by the album's title track Swim Team.

== Track listing ==
All songs by Arms and Sleepers (M. Lewis & M. Ramic)

1. Unbound - 3:28
2. Swim Team - 3:44
3. Hummingbird - 3:38
4. Tiger Tempo - 3:36
5. Mingus Mapps - 2:48
6. Forever Only - 1:29
7. Nobody more than you - 3:33
8. Ghost Loop - 3:00
9. Hurry Slowly - 3:36
10. Better Living Thru Chemistry - 2:36
11. Tetro - 3:12

The extended and LP versions were released in 2014

== Personnel ==
- Written and performed by Arms and Sleepers (Max Lewis and Mirza Ramic)
- Mixed and produced by Arms and Sleepers,
