= Michael Barrow & The Tourists =

American folk rock band

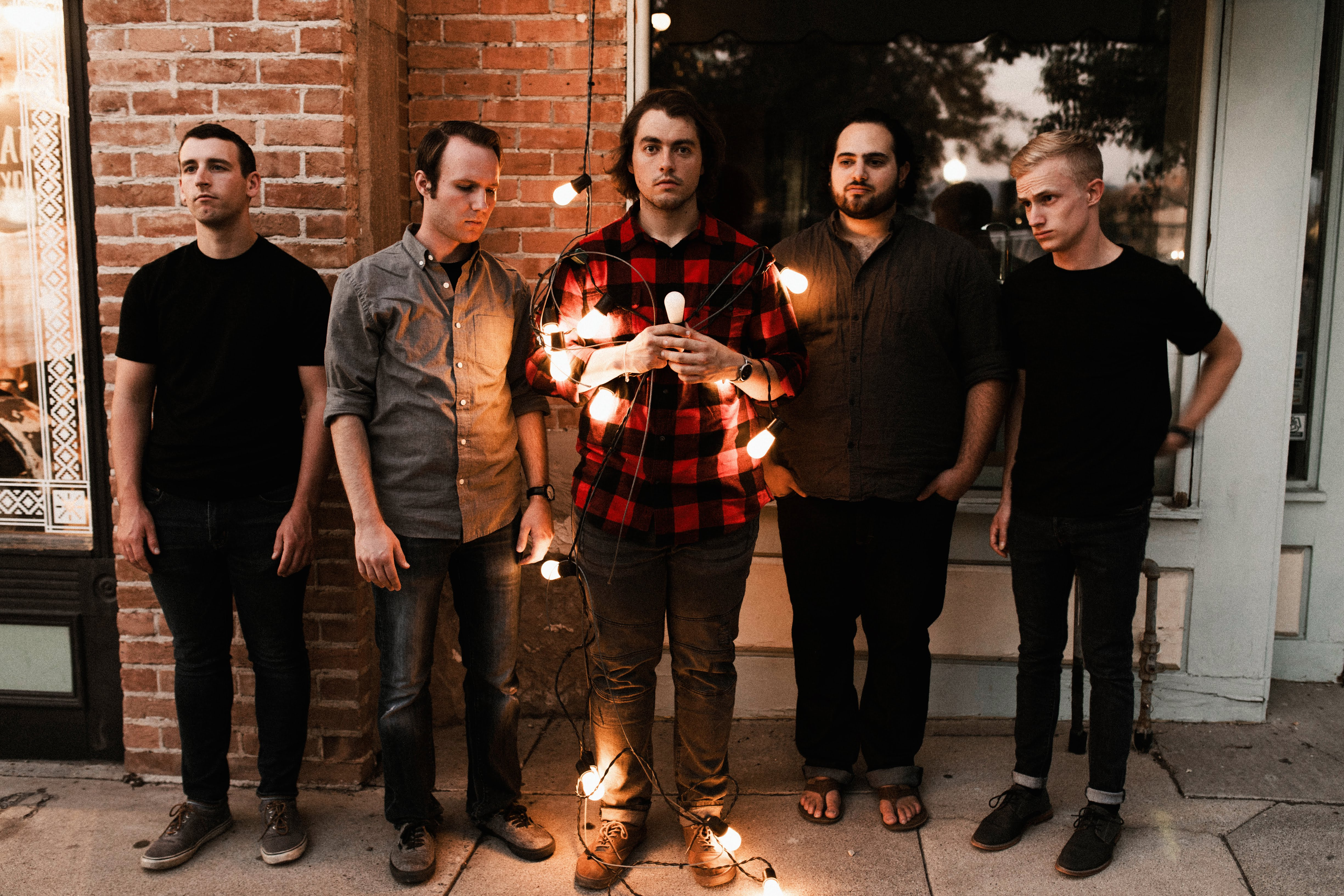
- Michael Barrow & The Tourists in 2018

Background information
- Also known as: Michael Barrow And The Tourists
- Origin: Provo, Utah, U.S.
- Genres: Folk rock
- Years active: 2016–present
- Labels: alexrainbirdRecords
- Members: Michael Barrow; Zach Collier; Reed Perkins; Alessandro Improta; Mac Wright
- Past members: Trevor Harmon; Mark Lanham
- Website: Official website

Michael Barrow & The Tourists is an American folk rock band from Provo, Utah. The five-member band consists of Michael Barrow (guitar and lead vocals), Zach Collier (keyboards), Reed Perkins (drums), Alessandro Improta (Bass), and Mac Wright (lead guitar and vocals).

The band formed in 2016 and has released four EPs and two full-length studio albums.

== History ==
=== 2016–2017: formation and Juneau ===
Michael Barrow & The Tourists began in early 2016 as the solo project of frontman Michael Barrow. Barrow was signed to a fledgling local record label called Wish Granted Records at the time, and its owner, Grant Fry, recruited a group of studio musicians to help record Barrow's first single. This single, called "The List," was recorded at Noisebox Studios with producer Dave Zimmerman. The group decided to back Barrow live at gigs in the area after a successful session and became the first iteration of The Tourists, featuring members Zach Collier, Reed Perkins, Alessandro Improta, and original lead guitarist Trevor Harmon.

Their debut album, Juneau, was mixed and mastered by Chicago native Brian Zieske, who produced the breakthrough records for both The Hush Sound and The Academy Is... in the early-2000s. The album's lead single "Turning To Gold" caught the attention of indie tastemaker Alex Rainbird, and they signed a deal with alexrainbirdRecords. The record received positive local reviews, with SLUG Magazine praising its "melodic beauty and narrative complexity" and Reach Provo calling it "a breath of fresh air."

=== 2018–2020: Santa Barbara Sessions, Lineup Changes, Something New and Something Different ===
In 2018, Michael Barrow & The Tourists released an EP entitled Santa Barbara Sessions. The record consisted of five acoustic tracks, and produced the notable "All I'll See Is You" which garnered hundreds of thousands of streams. The band returned to the studio with producer Brian Zieske in the summer of 2018 to work on their new EP, Something New. Harmon left the band on good terms in the middle of production and was replaced by Mark Lanham on lead guitar. Both are featured on the record, with Harmon providing lead guitar work and Lanham providing backing vocals on the band's most successful single "Sweet Honey."

After garnering millions of streams, the band toured the Western United States in 2019. The band cancelled their 2020 tour due to the COVID-19 pandemic. They released a YouTube exclusive album called LoFi Jams for Strange and Uncertain Times in April of that year. Something Different, an EP featuring remixes and alternate versions of tracks from Something New, arrived in September.

=== 2021–present: Clover ===
"Clover," the lead single and title track from their second full-length record, was released on January 29, 2021. Two more singles followed: "6,023" and "Tell Me How To Get To You." Michael Barrow & The Tourists released their second full-length album on July 23, 2021, on alexrainbirdRecords. It was produced by Scott Wiley, known for his work with The National Parks (band) and Neon Trees.

Mark Lanham left the band in 2021 to pursue his solo project. His album It's All What It's Meant To Be was released in 2022. Mac Wright joined the band in 2022 for their Sad Songs, Happy People tour.
