= Bill Allred =

Bill Allred may refer to:

- Bill Allred (radio host)
- Bill Allred (musician), father of John Allred (musician)
