= The National Parks (band) =

American folk pop band

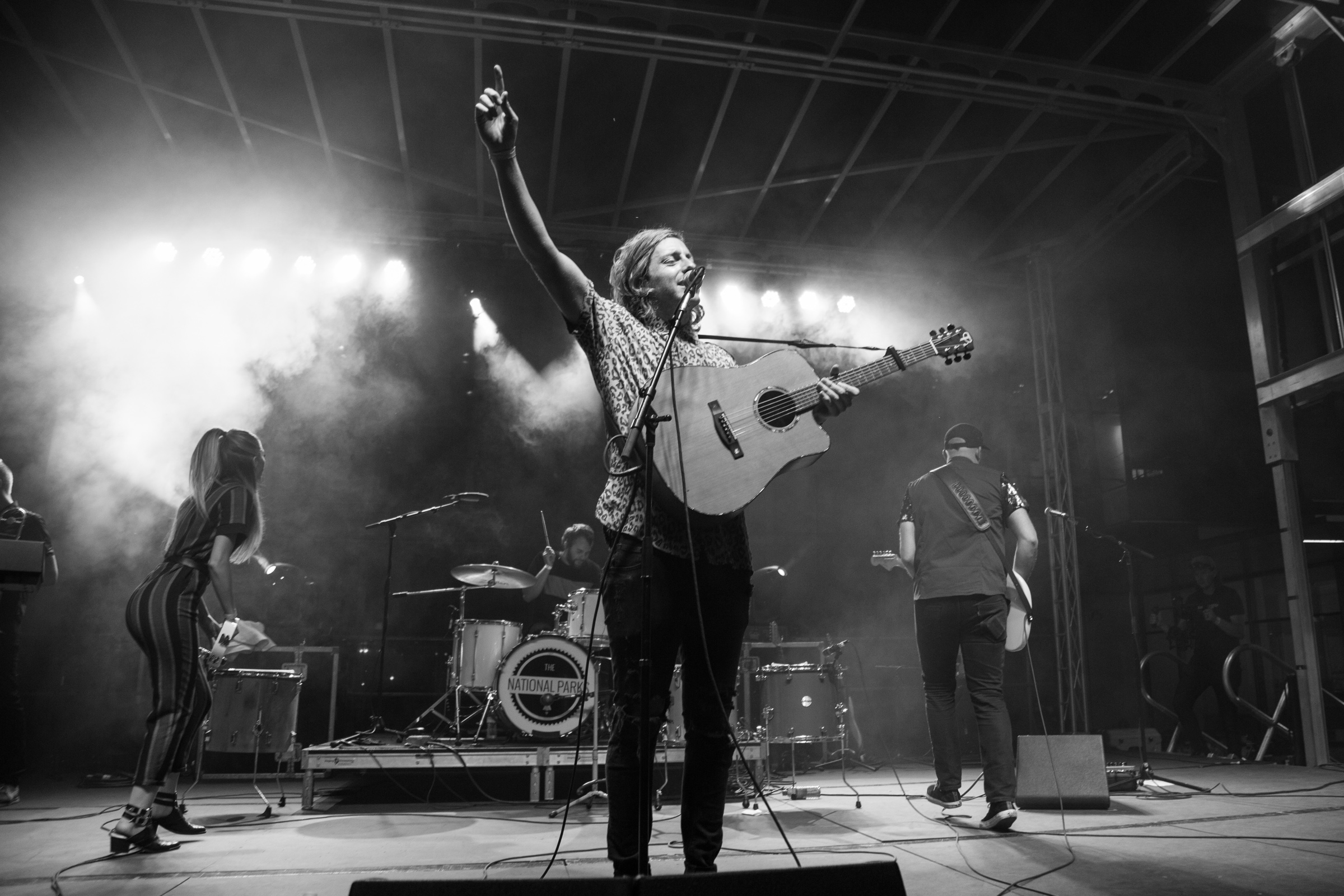
- The National Parks perform live at Provo's Rooftop Concert Series, July 1, 2016. Photo by Justin Hackworth.

Background information
- Origin: Provo, Utah
- Genre: Indie · folk pop · indie folk
- Years active: 2013–present
- Members: Brady Parks; Megan Taylor Parks
- Past members: Sydney Macfarlane; Cam Brannelly
- Website: thenationalparksband.com

The National Parks is an American indie folk band from Provo, Utah composed of husband-and-wife duo Brady Parks (guitar and lead vocals) and Megan Taylor Parks (fiddle and vocals).

Formed in 2013, their debut album, Young, reached #13 on the iTunes singer/songwriter chart upon its release. Founding members Sydney Macfarlane (keyboards and vocals) and Cam Brannelly (drums) departed the band in October 2025.

== History ==
=== 2012–2014: Formation and Young ===
The National Parks began as the brainchild of frontman Brady Parks. While studying advertising design at Brigham Young University in Provo, Utah, Parks began writing a collection of acoustic-heavy narrative folk tunes. After forming a group called "Brady Parks and the IndiAnns" for a battle of the bands competition at Velour Live Music Gallery, the group recorded an album called The Mossy Mountain, which was released to iTunes and Spotify on February 24, 2012.

The success of this first release prompted them to launch a successful Kickstarter campaign for the album that would eventually become Young.

After several lineup changes, the group was renamed The National Parks and made its first public performance on March 15, 2013. To advertise the performance, hundreds of flyers were circulated around Provo that offered little information other than the line, "Who are The National Parks?" A link to their website led to a video containing commentary from popular local bands and music venue owners.

The group released Young in 2013. The album was recorded at June Audio with producer Scott Wiley and climbed to #13 on the iTunes singer/songwriter chart. In January 2014 the band released the standalone single "As We Ran," which was written for the documentary film Love in the Tetons. The group donated the first month of proceeds from the single to the National Parks Conservation Association. The National Parks began touring around the release of Young. The online success of the album and "As We Ran" helped them find growing crowds around Utah as well as in Seattle, Los Angeles, Chicago, and New York City.

=== 2015–2016: Until I Live ===
International attention came to the band with the premiere of "Helsinki" on All Songs Considered in January 2015.

The band again worked with Scott Wiley on their second album, Until I Live, which was independently released September 2015 and climbed to #52 on the iTunes Pop Chart and #5 on Billboard's Top Heatseekers Chart for the Mountain Region. "Monsters of the North," the lead single from Until I Live, was announced as winner of the 2015 International Songwriting Competition. In March 2016, the band was named Utah's "Band of the Year" by Salt Lake City Weekly.

As part of the centennial of the National Park Service, The National Parks performed at an event with celebrated writer Terry Tempest Williams for the National Parks Conservation Association in June 2016. Since their sophomore release, the band has been favorably compared to a wide variety of acts including Foster the People, The Civil Wars, and Mumford & Sons, In addition to their own headlining shows, The National Parks has played with Andy Grammer, Peter Bjorn and John, The Lone Bellow, LeAnn Rimes, and The Moth & The Flame. The band has performed at South by Southwest, Canadian Music Week, School Night at Bardot's, Musikfest, Snowmass Mammoth Fest, and Make Music Pasadena, and has sold out shows in New York City, Washington, D.C., and Los Angeles.

=== 2017–2020: Places ===
In August 2017, The National Parks performed on JBTV in Chicago, announcing that their third album, Places, would be released September 15, 2017. The music video for the lead single, also title "Places," debuted through Impose on June 16, 2017. Places features a mix of folk-pop, featuring acoustic guitar and violin, in addition to electronic influences.

On September 8, 2017, the band launched the Places Tour. The tour concluded October 27, 2017, and took the band through 19 different cities across the United States.

On March 22, 2019, band released a new single, "I Can Feel It".

=== 2020–2023: Wildflower ===
On June 19, 2020, The National Parks released a new album, "Wildflower". To accommodate social distancing and work around venue closures due to the COVID-19 pandemic, they announced a more intimate tour, called "Campfire Tour", with 12 stops to promote their new album.

=== 2023–2024: 8th Wonder ===
On March 3, 2023, The National Parks released the album, 8th Wonder. On April 15, 2023, the band played a free concert to support the outdoor Arts Festival presented by Southern Utah University and the Beverley Taylor Sorenson Center for the Arts in Cedar City, Utah.

=== 2024-present: Wild Spirit ===
The band released their sixth album, Wild Spirit, on August 23, 2024.

On October 22, 2025, The National Parks announced the departure of Sydney Macfarlane and Cam Brannelly and stated that the band would continue on as a duo.
