= Utah Valley Symphony =

American orchestra

The Utah Valley Symphony is an American orchestra based in Provo, Utah.

The orchestra was organized in 1959 with about 30 members and an initial audience of eleven people. Today, it has grown to over 75 members and gives multiple performances to accommodate demand. The orchestra performs 6 concerts a season at the Covey Center for the Arts in Provo, Utah.
