= Fictionist =

American alternative rock band

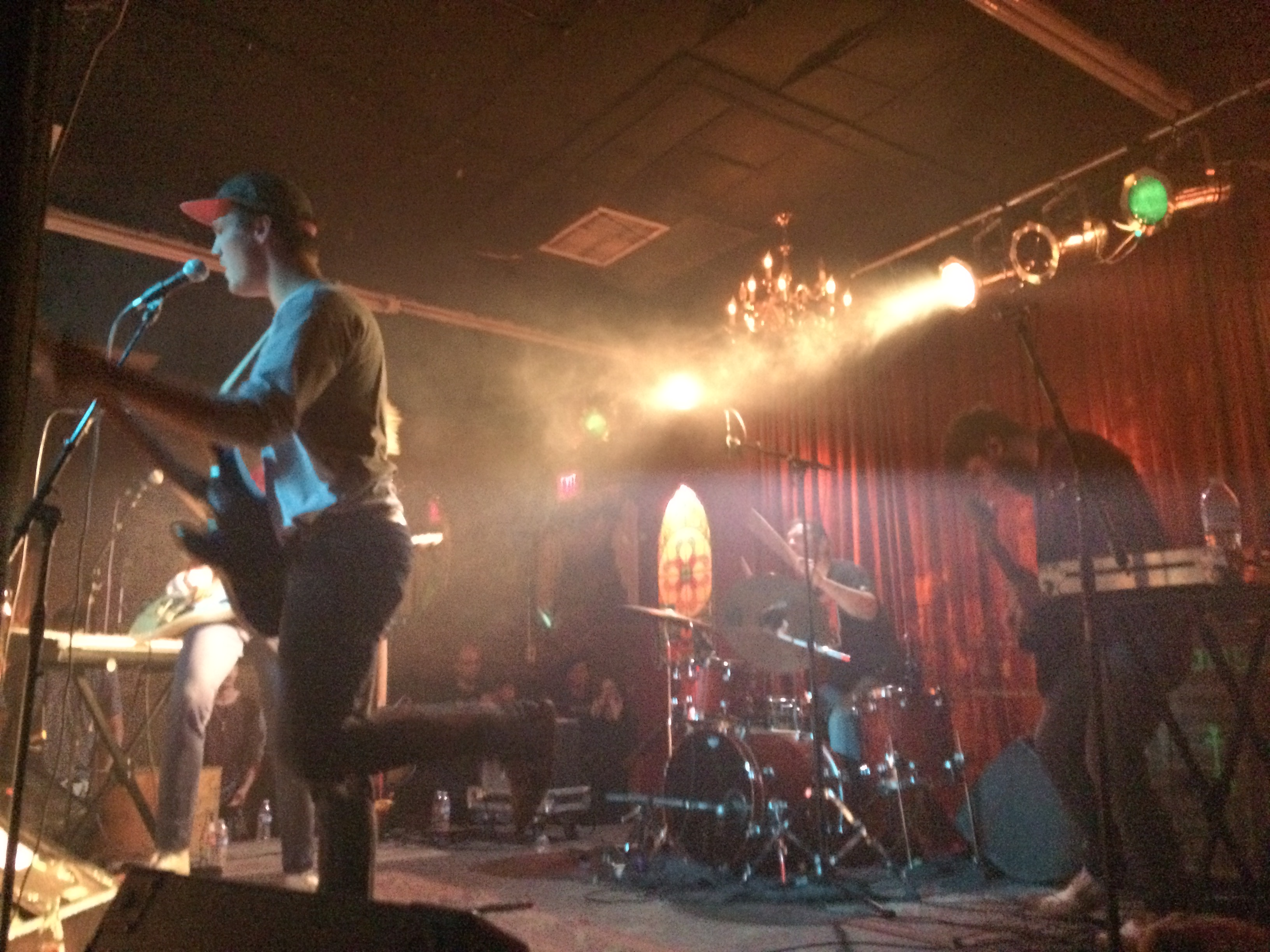
- Fictionist performing at the Velour

Background information
- Origin: Provo, Utah
- Genres: Alternative rock, progressive rock, new wave
- Years active: 2007–present
- Labels: Red Owl, Atlantic Records
- Members: Stuart Maxfield; Robbie Connolly; Brandon Kitterman; Aaron Anderson
- Past members: Spencer Harrison; Jeremy Bowen; Jacob Jones

Fictionist is an American alternative rock band from Provo, Utah, United States, with origins in Salt Lake City and Sacramento. The band consists of Stuart Maxfield (lead vocals, bass guitar), Robbie Connolly (lead vocals, guitar), Brandon Kitterman (guitar, bass guitar), and Aaron Anderson (drums). They have toured nationally and have opened for acts including Imagine Dragons, Vampire Weekend, Neon Trees, Young the Giant, and Shiny Toy Guns.

== History ==
=== Background and overview ===
The band began in its earliest formation as Good Morning Maxfield in 2007 and released an eponymous album under that name. Fictionist formed in their current configuration to release their first album Invisible Hand in 2009.

=== Invisible Hand (2009) ===
Fictionist released their first studio album, Invisible Hand, in January 2009. The band won an Independent Music Award for Best Pop/Rock Song for the eponymous single "Invisible Hand". Another song, "Noisy Birds", was featured in Seasons 6 and 7 of PBS's program Roadtrip Nation.

=== Lasting Echo (2010) ===
Lasting Echo unveiled the band's first official music video which was directed and animated by artist Eric Power. The music video for the single "Blue-eyed Universe" was featured at the 2010 Tucson Film & Music Festival.

Lasting Echo was selected by Paste magazine to be the April 2010 VIP bonus album. In 2011, they received another Independent Music Award for Best Pop/Rock Song for "Blue-Eyed Universe" from their second album, Lasting Echo. The album cover to Lasting Echo was also nominated for Pop/Rock Album and Best Album Art.

On February 15, 2011 it was announced on Late Night with Jimmy Fallon that Fictionist would be one of 16 bands to participate in the Rolling Stone Magazine "Do You Wanna Be A Rock 'n Roll Star?" Contest. During Round 2 they recorded two new tracks with producer David Bendeth (Paramore, Bring Me The Horizon, Kaiser Chiefs). They were eliminated in Round 4 of the competition as semifinalists.

=== Fictionist EP with Atlantic Records (2011–2014) ===
Fictionist signed with Atlantic Records and released a 6-track EP titled Fictionist - EP in September 2011.

In 2012 the band announced that it had recorded an album produced by Grammy nominated producer Ron Aniello (Bruce Springsteen, Lifehouse) and engineered by Nick DiDia (Pearl Jam, Bruce Springsteen, Stone Temple Pilots) for Atlantic Records. The new album was recorded at the historic Hollywood Sunset Sound Recorders. The band also announced that they used a guitar which Elvis Presley played on one of his albums during the album recording sessions.

Fictionist supported Imagine Dragons on two occasions in 2013 and 2014. Robbie Connolly also appears in the Imagine Dragons music video for "On Top of the World".

=== FICTIONIST and Free Spirit EP (2014–2016) ===
Following artistic disagreements with the label and a sense of stifled creativity, Fictionist ultimately chose not to release their final recordings with Atlantic Records. Instead they recorded a new independent self-titled album produced by Nate Pyfer (Kaskade, The Moth & the Flame, Mideau). FICTIONIST was released in Provo, UT, on October 3, 2014, and nationally on October 7.

After parting ways with Atlantic Records, Fictionist took advantage of their new freedom to include new and unconventional sounds in their tracks. Robbie Connolly began to actively compose and sing along with Stuart Maxfield, an arrangement the band had not had previously.

In 2015, they toured with Mates of State and on a summer east-coast tour with Neon Trees. They scheduled a 2015 Tour to coincide with the "An Intimate Night With Neon Trees" Tour on various dates. Concerts with the Neon Trees ran between June 13 through July 26 finishing up in Boston, MA at the Paradise Rock Club, before heading to Salt Lake City, UT for a show with the Kills & Metz for the Twilight Concert Series.

On July 29, 2016, Fictionist released a four track EP titled Free Spirit. Toward the end of the year they toured in central and south-western United States with Minnesota indie rock band Step Rockets.

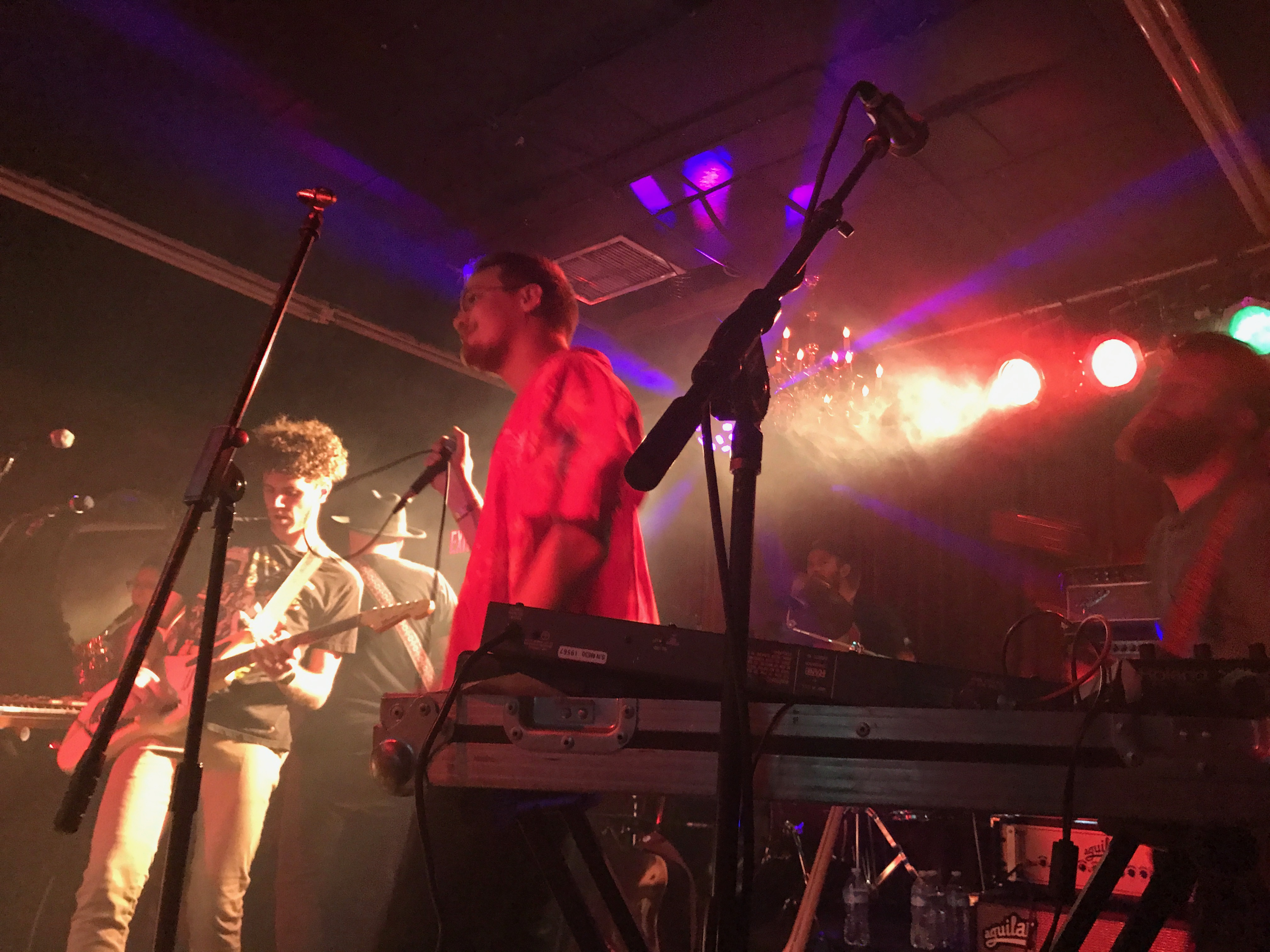
Fictionist performing at their Sleep Machine release concert in May 2017

=== Sleep Machine (2017–2024) ===
On May 12, 2017 Fictionist released a ten track album titled Sleep Machine and started a west coast tour with Eric Robertson accompanying the band on the keyboard. Sleep Machine is a shorter album with more interconnected songs compared to previous releases by Fictionist.

=== REPEATER (2025–present) ===
On February 5, 2025 Stuart Maxfield announced via the band's Instagram account that they had completed a new record, including links to stream the album for free before it would be officially released to streaming platforms. On February 17, 2025, the Velour Live Music Gallery announced via their Instagram that Fictionist and Robert Loud would be co-headlining an album release show on March 28, with Fictionist releasing REPEATER and Robert Loud releasing Bitter Optimist. REPEATER became available on streaming platforms and available for purchase on iTunes on March 23, 2025. On March 28, the band performed the majority of REPEATER (exceptions being Everywhere and High Hopes and was joined on stage for an encore by Jacob Jones, where they performed Figure In the Fog and Great Escape from the 2011 Victory self-titled EP, as well as City At War from their 2014 self-titled LP. In a February 25 podcast appearance, Maxfield confirmed the band was working on another record.

== Media ==
- Fictionist was the subject of a The Song That Changed My Life episode on BYUtv.

== Band members ==
Current members

- Stuart Maxfield – lead vocals, bass (2007–present)
- Robbie Connolly – lead vocals, guitar, keyboards (2007–present)
- Brandon Kitterman – lead guitar, keyboards, backing vocals (2007–present)
- Aaron Anderson – drums (2007–present)
- Jacob Jones – keyboard (2007–2015)(2024-present)

Past members

- Spencer Harrison – bass (2008–2010)
- Jeremy Bowen (2007–2009) (Good Morning Maxfield)

Timeline

== Discography ==
=== Studio albums ===
- Invisible Hand (2009)
- Lasting Echo (2010)
- Fictionist (2014)
- Sleep Machine (2017)
- REPEATER (2025)

=== Extended plays ===
- Fictionist - EP (Atlantic, 2011)
- "Free Spirit" (2016)

== Awards ==
Year	Nominated work	Organization	Award	Result
2010	"Invisible Hand"	Independent Music Awards	Best Pop/Rock Song	Won
2011	"Blue-eyed Universe"	Independent Music Awards	Best Pop/Rock Song	Won
2011	Lasting Echo	Independent Music Awards	Best Pop/Rock Album	Nominated
2011	Lasting Echo	Independent Music Awards	Best Album Artwork	Nominated

- 2015 Salt Lake City Weekly Best Band Winner
