= Uzi and Ari =

American indie rock band

Uzi & Ari
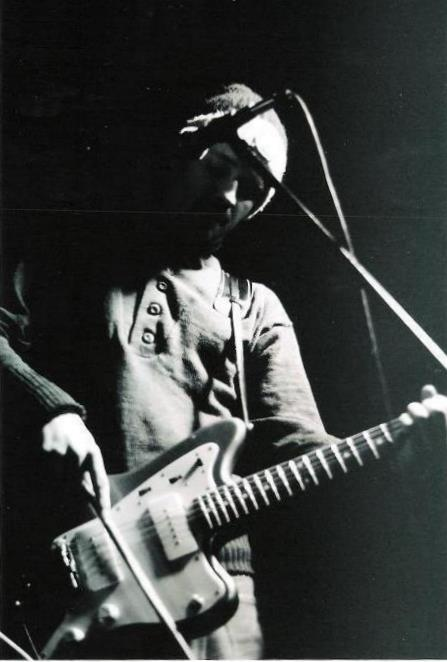
- Ben Shepard

Background information
- Origin: Salt Lake City, Utah
- Genres: Indie rock
- Years active: 2003–2012
- Labels: Clumsy Congregation; Own Records (Europe); Friend of Mine (Japan); Brave Morning Records (Vinyl)
- Members: Ben Shepard; Andrew Glassett; Catherine Worsham; Garrett Martin; Ryan Moore
- Website: Uzi & Ari

Uzi & Ari was an American indie rock band based in Salt Lake City, Utah that has received favorable comparisons to artists such as Thom Yorke, Mogwai, The Postal Service, and The Album Leaf. Founded by Ben Shepard in 2003, Uzi and Ari has seen many changes in its lineup. The last lineup of the group included Ben Shepard (vocals, guitar, organ), Andrew Glassett (drums), Catherine Worsham (bass, backing vocals), Garrett Martin (guitar, keyboard), Ryan Moore (violin, guitar, French horn), and David Moore (guitar, bass, trombone, keyboard, accordion, glockenspiel). Following a month-long 2006 tour of the United States, Uzi and Ari was picked up by the European label Own Records, and left on a successful six-week European tour in the Spring of 2007.

== History ==
Uzi & Ari was formed by Ben Shepard (not of Soundgarden fame) in 2003. Shepard had been involved in another group, Oriental Half Price, in Allen, Texas (near Dallas) where he attended high school. He left the band in 2001 to live in Santiago, Chile for two years (to serve a mission for the LDS Church), and returned to the United States in 2003, relocating to Utah, where he began playing with assorted musicians under the name Uzi and Ari. The band takes its name from the children of Ben Stiller's character in the movie The Royal Tenenbaums, and does not refer to any members of the band (Uzi and Ari was never a duo, as is sometimes mistakenly assumed).

After a short stint in California, Shepard and former member Cade Thalman traveled to Shepard's hometown of Dallas, Texas, where they recorded the band's first album, Don't Leave in Such a Hurry, with some local musicians. The album was self-financed and had a limited release, although it was well-reviewed, notably by indie website Music (For Robots), who proclaimed it a "wonderful little album."

The band played mainly local shows in Salt Lake City following Don't Leave in Such a Hurry, with various members of the band coming and going. Shepard continued working on new material, and for the new album chose to record in Utah at the studio of Salt Lake's Crying Girl Records. Crying Girl is a small label run by Blake Henderson of another Utah-based indie group, TaughtMe. Because of its low key nature, Shepard was able to work on Uzi and Ari's second album for a number of months in Henderson's studio, rather than purchasing recording time in a block as he had done for Don't Leave in Such a Hurry. Shepard recorded through the winter of 2005-06, releasing teaser tracks at the band's website, which helped create an online fan base. Finally, in April 2006 the new album It is Freezing Out was released, featuring cover art work by renowned painter Thrush Holmes (also known as "Truman Couture" and "Herman Weiss") who has since used the song "Don't Black Out" in his promotions.

It is Freezing Out featured a different side of the band, including electronic beats, softer sounds, more ambient noise, and stronger vocals from Shepard. Where Don't Leave in Such a Hurry is loud and emotional, It is Freezing Out is more subdued and anguished, featuring songs about failed relationships, inner turmoil, and even a lullaby. The second album was also received well, with one review describing it as "a rich, dense album filled with tiny, quiet moments worthy of careful attention and full engagement," although some reviewers were less-pleased about the transition from the louder first album.

The band toured the western United States in promotion of this album, playing mainly small venues in Utah, Idaho, Montana, Washington, Oregon, California, Tijuana, Texas, Arizona, Nevada, Kansas, and Colorado. Following the tour the band was contacted by the European label Own Records, which had first heard of the group through an online French review of the first album. Own offered to serve as the European face of Uzi and Ari (Own Records is now distributed stateside through Secretly Canadian Distribution), beginning with the band's second album, and financed a European tour in the Spring of 2007. The tour was a great success—the band played some nights before a crowd of more than one thousand people. In addition to a number of magazine articles written about the band while in Europe, Uzi and Ari played three radio shows in Belgium and Italy, and the band's music videos were put into rotation in Luxembourg, Germany and France.

In the summer of 2007 Uzi and Ari signed to the Japanese label "Friend of Mine Records." The band toured the country in the fall of 2008. At the same time, two Uzi and Ari music videos were put into rotation on MTV Japan.

Uzi & Ari released Headworms in October, completed another successful European tour during winter 2009, and embarked on their first Japanese tour in April 2009.

=== The End of Uzi & Ari ===
On March 7, 2012, Ben Shepard posted the following message on the Uzi & Ari Facebook page:

Deer Freins:
Uzi & Ari have retired. But! Don't be alarmed. . .
I have a new band called Young Adult that I would love for you to become acquainted with. If 100 people 'like' the page in the next three days I'll post a 30-second clip of one of the songs featured on the upcoming LP 'Are You Haunted?' I could sure use your help getting the word out. Something glorious is about to happen. . .

== Discography ==
=== Albums ===
Release date	Title	Label	Notes
2004	Don't Leave in Such a Hurry	Crying Girl Records (U.S.)	
2006	It is Freezing Out	Crying Girl Records (U.S.), Own Records (Europe)	
2008	Headworms	Own Records (Europe), Friend of Mine Records (Japan)	This was also released on vinyl by Brave Morning Records.
2010	Uzi & Ari/ Taught Me Split EP	Clumsy Congregation	On this record, each artist covers a song by Björk, as well as one of the other artist's works.
2010	The Air is Thin as Paper Here	Self-released	This was the first LP ever recorded by Uzi & Ari, actually predating Dont Leave in Such a Hurry, but it was never before released. It was given as a reward for supporting Ben Shepard's Kickstarter project.
