= Salt Lake City Weekly =

Newspaper in Utah, United States

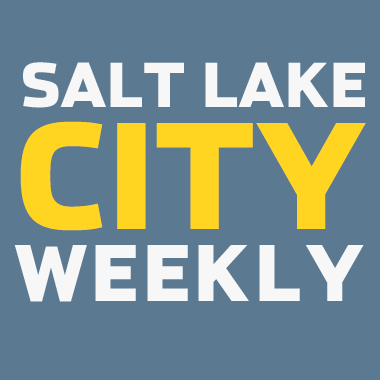

- The offices of Salt Lake City Weekly
- Type: Alternative weekly
- Format: Tabloid
- Owner(s): Copperfield Publishing, Inc.
- Publisher: John Saltas
- Editor: Rachel Piper; Scott Renshaw; Stephen Dark; Jerre Wroble
- Founded: 1984 (as Private Eye)
- Language: English
- Headquarters: Salt Lake City, Utah; US
- Circulation: 55,000
- Website: cityweekly.net

Salt Lake City Weekly is a free alternative weekly tabloid newspaper published in Salt Lake City, Utah. It began in 1984 as a monthly newsletter called Private Eye.

City Weekly is published and dated for every Thursday by Copperfield Publishing Inc. of which John Saltas is majority owner and president.

== History ==
After studying journalism at the University of Utah, John Saltas was hired in 1981 as an associate editor at Country Style magazine in Chicago. He was inspired by the Chicago Reader to launch a similar publication back home in Salt Lake City. At that time businesses that sold cocktails and other alcoholic mixed drinks were regulated as "private clubs," and required paid membership and couldn't advertise.

In 1984, Saltas launched The Private Eye, a monthly newsletter mailed to members of participating clubs. At that time Saltas was the only employee and he worked out of his basement. Alcohol restrictions were loosed in the '80s. This boosted advertising sales, which allowed Saltas expanded his publication into a bi-weekly alternative newspaper in 1988. A year later, the paper was admitted as the 40th member of the Association of Alternative Newsmedia.

In 1992, Saltas hired Tom Walsh to replace him as managing editor. At that time Private Eye Weekly emerged as a weekly tabloid-style alternative paper with distribution outlets in Salt Lake City, Ogden, Park City and Utah County. By 1996, the paper had a circulation of 50,000 copies distributed each Thursday at 1,000 pick-up points. The paper had three full-time editorial employees and a stable of freelance contributors. The total staff was 20. At that time, Walsh left to go work at the Miami New Times. In 1997, the paper changed its name to Salt Lake City Weekly, abbreviated to City Weekly on the masthead. This was due to many people misunderstanding the paper's original name, assuming that the Private Eye was a detective agency. By then the paper had won 30 professional journalism awards. In 2012, Saltas became the publisher again.

== Lawsuit ==
During the late 1990s, a suit to allow club and liquor advertising began making its way through local courts. City Weekly had tried and failed to persuade the state's Department of Alcoholic Beverage Control to lift Utah's peculiar restrictions on liquor advertising. National media like Wall Street Journal and USA Today were published without constraints on their advertising. The case dragged on for years in Utah District Court before Judge David Sam, who rejected the claim that advertising liquor in Utah was bound by national precedent.

The Tenth Circuit Court of Appeals overturned this ruling on July 24, 2001, when the court remanded plaintiff's request for appeal on the district court's ruling to deny preliminary injunction. The Tenth Circuit stated that the plaintiffs satisfied requirements for an injunction, forcing the state to allow liquor advertising. In August the Utah Alcoholic Beverage Control Commission began drafting amendments to legalize liquor advertising in print, in restaurants, and on billboards. The LDS Church thought that the commission's proposed changes went too far and urged retention of the old rules.

Saltas chided the Church in an editorial, but offered them a free full-page ad so they could explain their position against liquor advertising. The Church had not previously advertised in the paper, which was often considered anti-Mormon, but they accepted Saltas' offer. On November 29, 2001, City Weekly published the LDS statement. The same issue carried the paper's first liquor ad, for Jim Beam. Saltas told The Salt Lake Tribune that the timing was "just an ironic coincidence."

== Staff ==
=== Editors ===
- 1984 - 1992: John Saltas
- 1992 - 1996: Tom Walsh
- 1996 - October 2002: Christopher Smart
- November 2002 - August 2003: John Yewell
- August 2003 - April 2007: Ben Fulton
- April 2007 - February 2009: Holly Mullen
- February 2009–May 2013: Jerre Wroble
- May 2013-May 2014 (Interim): Rachel Piper, Scott Renshaw, Stephen Dark
- June 2014-January 2015: Rachel Piper
- January. 2015 - May 5, 2016: Jerre Wroble
- May 2016 - April 2020: Enrique Limón
- 2021 – Present: Benjamin Wood

=== Publishers ===
- 1984 - Nov 2003: John Saltas
- Nov 2003–May 2012: Jim Rizzi
- May 2012 – Present: John Saltas
