= Neon Trees discography =

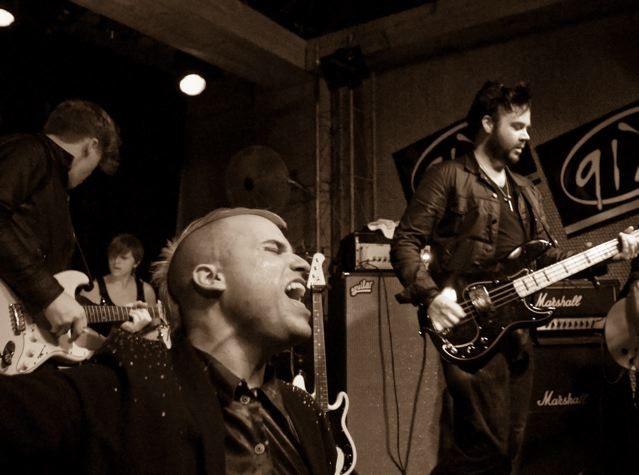
- Neon Trees performing at a radio event in March 2010
- Studio albums: 5
- Extended plays: 3
- Singles: 18
- Music videos: 15

The discography of American alternative rock band Neon Trees consists of five studio albums, three extended plays, eighteen singles and fifteen music videos.

The band's first release, the extended play Start a Fire, was released in 2009. The same year, they released their debut single "Animal". The single peaked at number 13 on the US Billboard Hot 100 and topped the Billboard Alternative Songs chart. "Animal" was later certified double platinum by the Recording Industry Association of America (RIAA). Neon Trees released their debut studio album Habits in March 2010. The album peaked at number 113 on the US Billboard 200 and also hit the Australian and United Kingdom albums charts. "1983" and "Your Surrender", the album's second and third singles, peaked in the top 30 of the Alternative Songs chart. The band's 2011 single "Everybody Talks" peaked at number six on the Billboard Hot 100, giving the band their first top ten hit on the chart. Picture Show, their second studio album, was released in April 2012; it peaked at number 17 on the Billboard 200.

== Albums ==
=== Studio albums ===
List of studio albums, with selected chart positions and certifications
| Title | Album details | Peak chart positions | | | | | | | |
| Title | Album details | US | US Alt. | US Rock | AUS | CAN | GER | SCO | UK |
|---|---|---|---|---|---|---|---|---|---|
| Habits | Released: March 16, 2010 (US); Label: Mercury; Formats: CD, LP, digital download | 113 | 15 | 28 | 39 | — | 87 | 58 | 59 |
| Picture Show | Released: April 17, 2012 (US); Label: Mercury; Formats: CD, LP, digital download | 17 | 5 | 9 | — | 77 | — | — | — |
| Pop Psychology | Released: April 22, 2014 (US); Label: Mercury; Formats: CD, LP, digital download | 6 | 1 | 1 | — | — | — | — | — |
| I Can Feel You Forgetting Me | Released: July 24, 2020 (US); Label: Thrill Forever; Formats: Digital download, streaming, vinyl | — (Note: I Can Feel You Forgetting Me did not enter the US Billboard 200, but peaked at number 56 on the Top Current Album Sales Chart.) | — | — | — | — | — | — | — |
| Sink Your Teeth | Released: September 20, 2024 (US); Label: Round Hill Records; Formats: CD, digital download, streaming, vinyl | — | — | — | — | — | — | — | — |
"—" denotes a recording that did not chart or was not released in that territory.

== Extended plays ==
List of extended plays
| Title | Details |
|---|---|
| Neon Trees | Released: 2006 (US); Label: Self-released; Formats: CD, Digital Download |
| The Treehouse Sessions Vol. One | Released: 2006 (US); Label: Self-released; Formats: Digital Download |
| Becoming Different People | Released: 2006 (US); Label: Self-released; Formats: CD, Digital Download |
| Start a Fire | Released: 2009 (US); Label: Self-released; Formats: CD |
| iTunes Live from SoHo | Released: November 30, 2010 (US); Label: Mercury; Formats: Digital download |
| iTunes Live: SXSW | Released: March 19, 2011 (US); Label: Mercury; Formats: Digital download |
| Versions of You | Released: December 10, 2021 (US); Label: Thrill Forever; Formats: Digital download |

== Singles ==
=== As lead artist ===
List of singles, with selected chart positions and certifications, showing year released and album name
| Title | Year | Peak chart positions | | | | | | | | | | Certifications | Album |
| Title | Year | US | US Rock | AUS | CAN | CZE | DEN | GER | NLD | NZ | UK | Certifications | Album |
|---|---|---|---|---|---|---|---|---|---|---|---|---|---|
| "Animal" | 2010 | 13 | 2 | 25 | 29 | — | 12 | 38 | 46 | 30 | 40 | RIAA: 2× Platinum; ARIA: Platinum; BPI: Gold; RMNZ: 2× Platinum | Habits |
| "1983" | 2010 | — | 28 | 76 | — | — | — | — | 26 | — | — | | Habits |
| "Wish List" | 2010 | — | — | — | — | — | — | — | — | — | — | | Non-album single |
| "Your Surrender" | 2011 | — (Note: "Your Surrender" did not enter the Billboard Hot 100, but peaked at number 42 on the US Airplay Top 100 chart.) | 50 | — | — | — | — | — | — | — | — | | Habits |
| "Sins of My Youth" | 2011 | — | — | — | — | — | — | — | — | — | — | | Habits |
| "Everybody Talks" | 2011 | 6 | 11 | 10 | 35 | 18 | — | — | — | 37 | 164 | RIAA: 7× Platinum; ARIA: 2× Platinum; BPI: Platinum; BVMI: Gold; IFPI DEN: Gold; RMNZ: 3× Platinum | Picture Show |
| "Lessons in Love (All Day, All Night)" (featuring Kaskade) | 2012 | — | 26 | — | — | — | — | — | 27 | — | — | | Picture Show |
| "Sleeping with a Friend" | 2014 | 51 | 8 | — | 69 | — | — | — | — | — | — | RIAA: Gold | Pop Psychology |
| "I Love You (But I Hate Your Friends)" | 2014 | — | — | — | — | — | — | — | — | — | — | | Pop Psychology |
| "Text Me in the Morning" | 2014 | — | — | — | — | — | — | — | — | — | — | | Pop Psychology |
| "Songs I Can't Listen To" | 2015 | — | 48 | — | — | — | — | — | — | — | — | | Non-album singles |
| "Feel Good" | 2017 | — | — | — | — | — | — | — | — | — | — | | Non-album singles |
| "Used to Like" | 2019 | — | 17 | — | — | — | — | — | — | — | — | | I Can Feel You Forgetting Me |
| "New Best Friend" | 2020 | — | — (Note: "New Best Friend" did not enter the Hot Rock & Alternative Songs chart, but peaked at number 33 on the Alternative Airplay chart.) | — | — | — | — | — | — | — | — | | I Can Feel You Forgetting Me |
| "Mess Me Up" | 2020 | — | — | — | — | — | — | — | — | — | — | | I Can Feel You Forgetting Me |
| "Nights" | 2020 | — | — | — | — | — | — | — | — | — | — | | I Can Feel You Forgetting Me |
| "Holiday Rock" | 2021 | — | — | — | — | — | — | — | — | — | — | | Non-album single |
| "Versions of You" | 2022 | — | — | — | — | — | — | — | — | — | — | | Versions of You |
| "Favorite Daze" | 2023 | — | — (Note: "Favorite Daze" did not enter the Hot Rock & Alternative Songs chart, but peaked at number 30 on the Alternative Airplay chart.) | — | — | — | — | — | — | — | — | | Sink Your Teeth |
| "Losing My Head" | 2023 | — | — | — | — | — | — | — | — | — | — | | Sink Your Teeth |
| "Bad Dreams" | 2024 | — | — (Note: "Bad Dreams" did not enter the Hot Rock & Alternative Songs chart, but peaked at number 22 on the Alternative Airplay chart.) | — | — | — | — | — | — | — | — | | Sink Your Teeth |
| "El Diablo" | 2024 | — | — | — | — | — | — | — | — | — | — | | Sink Your Teeth |
| "Cruel Intentions" | 2024 | — | — | — | — | — | — | — | — | — | — | | Sink Your Teeth |
"—" denotes a recording that did not chart or was not released in that territory.

=== As featured artist ===
List of songs, with selected chart positions, showing year released and album name
| Title | Year | Peak chart positions | | | Album |
| Title | Year | US | US Dance | NLD | Album |
|---|---|---|---|---|---|
| "Lessons in Love" (Kaskade featuring Neon Trees) | 2011 | 94 | 25 | 22 | Fire & Ice |
| "Dreamteam" (Galantis featuring Neon Trees) | 2023 | — | — | — | Rx |
"—" denotes a recording that did not chart or was not released in that territory.

=== Promotional singles ===
List of promotional singles showing year released and album name
| Title | Year | Album |
|---|---|---|
| "Calling My Name" | 2009 | Start a Fire |
| "In the Next Room" | 2010 | Habits |
| "Weekend" | 2012 | Picture Show |
| "First Things First" | 2014 | Pop Psychology |
| "Everybody Talks" (Revisited Version) | 2022 | Versions of You |

== Guest appearances ==
List of non-single guest appearances, showing year released and album name
| Title | Year | Album |
|---|---|---|
| "Your Surrender" (Remix) | 2011 | Prom soundtrack |
| "Lessons in Love" (Kaskade featuring Neon Trees) | 2011 | Fire & Ice |
| "Electric Heart (Stay Forever)" | 2012 | Frankenweenie: Unleashed! |
| "Some Kind of Monster" | 2013 | Iron Man 3: Heroes Fall – Music Inspired by the Motion Picture |
| "Mad Love" (Acoustic) | 2014 | Dallas Buyers Club soundtrack |

== Music videos ==
List of music videos, showing year released and director
| Title | Year | Director(s) |
|---|---|---|
| "Calling My Name" | 2009 | Tyler Glenn |
| "Animal" (version 1) | 2010 | Zach Rogers |
| "Animal" (version 2) | 2010 | BBGun |
| "In the Next Room" | 2010 | Zach Rogers |
| "1983" (version 1) | 2010 | Paul "Coy" Allen |
| "1983" (version 2) | 2010 | Dan Douglas |
| "Your Surrender" | 2011 | Patricio Motta |
| "Your Surrender" (Prom version) | 2011 | Paul "Coy" Allen |
| "Everybody Talks" (version 1) | 2012 | Paul Boyd |
| "Everybody Talks" (version 2) | 2012 | Joshua Mikel |
| "Lessons in Love (All Day, All Night)" (featuring Kaskade) | 2013 | Paul Boyd |
| "Sleeping with a Friend" | 2014 | Brad and Brian Palmer |
| "I Love You (But I Hate Your Friends)" | 2014 | Tyler Glenn |
| "Voices in the Halls" | 2014 | Tyler Glenn |
| "First Things First" | 2014 | Tyler Glenn |
| "Songs I Can't Listen To" | 2015 | Rebecca Thomas |
| "Feel Good" | 2017 | Tyler Glenn |
| "Used to Like" | 2020 | Unknown |
| "Holiday Rock" | 2021 | Unknown |
| "Versions of You" | 2022 | Unknown |
| "Everybody Talks" (Revisited Version) | 2022 | Unknown |
| "Favorite Daze" | 2023 | Caleb Mallery |
| "Dreamteam" | 2023 | Juan Flores Mena |
| "Losing My Head" | 2023 | Unknown |
| "Bad Dreams" | 2024 | Caleb Mallery |
