= All day, all night =

All day, all night may refer to:

- 24/7 service
- All Day, All Night, 1997 album by Changing Faces
- "All Day, All Night", a song by Stephanie Mills from the 1992 album Something Real
- "All Day All Night", a song by Shinee from the 2018 album The Story of Light
- "Lessons in Love (All Day, All Night)", a song by Neon Trees featuring Kaskade from the 2012 album Picture Show

== See also ==
- "All Day and All of the Night", 1964 song by The Kinks
- All Day and All of the Night Remixes, 2005 EP by Flunk
- "All Night, All Day", spiritual song
