= Your Surrender =

Single by Neon Trees

from the album Habits
- Released: February 22, 2011
- Recorded: 2009–10
- Genre: Alternative rock, dance-rock
- Length: 3:40
- Label: Mercury
- Songwriters: S*A*M, Sluggo, Tyler Glenn, Chris Allen, Branden Campbell, Elaine Bradley
- Producer: Tim Pagnotta

Neon Trees singles chronology
"1983" (2010)	"Your Surrender" (2011)	"Everybody Talks" (2011)

"Your Surrender" is the third single from American rock band Neon Trees' debut album Habits. It was written by S*A*M, Sluggo, Tyler Glenn and produced by Tim Pagnotta. It was released on February 22, 2011. The song peaked at number 27 on the Billboard Alternative Songs chart and number 50 on the Billboard Rock Songs chart. A remix version of "Your Surrender" by JD Walker was featured in the Disney film Prom and its soundtrack.

== Music videos ==
=== Neon Trees version ===
A music video to accompany the release of "Your Surrender" was first released onto YouTube on 15 July 2011 at a total length of three minutes and thirty-nine seconds.

=== Prom version ===
Another video titled Prom version was released on April 6, 2011 and directed by Paul Coy Allen. The video features the cast of Disney's Prom (Aimee Teegarden, Thomas McDonell, Janelle Ortiz and Nicholas Braun) alongside the band.

== Track listing ==
Digital download
No.	Title	Length
1.	"Your Surrender"	3:40
2.	"Your Surrender" (JD Walker Remix)	4:15

== Credits and personnel ==
- Lead vocals – Neon Trees
- Producers – Tim Pagnotta
- Lyrics – S*A*M, Sluggo, Tyler Glenn
- Label: Mercury Records

== Chart performance ==
Chart (2011)	Peak position
US Pop Airplay (Billboard)	38
US Rock Songs (Billboard)	50
US Alternative Airplay (Billboard)	27
US Adult Pop Airplay (Billboard)	24

== Release history ==
Release dates and formats for "Your Surrender"
Region	Date	Format	Label(s)	Ref.
United States	April 26, 2011	Mainstream airplay	Mercury	
