= 1983 (song) =

Single by Neon Trees

from the album Habits
- Released: September 28, 2010
- Recorded: 2009
- Genre: Alternative rock, dance-rock
- Length: 3:42
- Label: Mercury
- Songwriters: Chris Allen, Branden Campbell, Elaine Bradley, Tyler Glenn, Tim Pagnotta
- Producer: Tim Pagnotta

Neon Trees singles chronology
"Animal" (2010)	"1983" (2010)	"Your Surrender" (2011)

"1983" is the second single from American rock band Neon Trees' debut album Habits. It was written by Tyler Glenn and produced by Tim Pagnotta. It was released on September 28, 2010. The song peaked at No. 13 on the Billboard Alternative Songs chart and No. 28 on the Billboard Rock Songs chart in January 2011.

Glenn was writing the song to sound like a 1980s throwback, "Obviously the song can't hide from the '80s thing, but really that song is more about return to innocence in love and in relationships. I thought the lo-fi VHS tape look was clever."

The song itself got its title from the year Glenn was born. Lead bassist Branden Campbell also stated in an interview that the song was not about the year 1983, but going back to the innocence in one another's lives where relationships were easier and families were always together.

== Track listing ==
Digital download
No.	Title	Lyrics	Producer(s)	Length
1.	"1983"	Tyler Glenn	Tim Pagnotta	3:42
2.	"Animal (Adam Freeland remix)"	Tyler Glenn	Adam Freeland	12:34

== Chart performance ==
Chart (2011)	Peak position
German Airplay Chart	86
US Alternative Airplay (Billboard)	13
US Rock Songs (Billboard)	28
