= Picture show =

Picture show is another name for films, mostly used in the United States.

Picture show may also refer to:

- Picture Show (album), a 2012 album by Neon Trees
- Picture Show (magazine), a British film magazine
- The Rocky Horror Picture Show, a 1975 musical comedy film
- Ed, Edd n Eddy's Big Picture Show, a 2009 animated road television film
- "Picture Show Life", a song from the Ringo Starr's album Old Wave
