= Sink Your Teeth =

Studio album by Neon Trees
- Released: September 20, 2024
- Genre: Alternative; indie
- Length: 40:08
- Label: Round Hill
- Producer: Dan Book; Joe Janiak

Neon Trees chronology
I Can Feel You Forgetting Me (2020)	Sink Your Teeth (2024)

Singles from Sink Your Teeth
- 1. "Favorite Daze" Released: June 30, 2023; 2. "Bad Dreams" Released: May 31, 2024; 3. "El Diablo" Released: July 19, 2024; 4. "Cruel Intentions" Released: August 23, 2024

Sink Your Teeth is the fifth studio album by American rock band Neon Trees. The lead single, "Favorite Daze", was released on June 30, 2023, and the album was released on September 20, 2024.

== Background ==
The band's previous album, I Can Feel You Forgetting Me, was released during the COVID-19 pandemic in 2020. In an interview, lead singer Tyler Glenn contributed the origins of Sink Your Teeth to the pandemic and the themes of control, collaboration, and the universal feeling of uncertainty. Glenn further credited the album with "exploring a duality I feel deeply — that mix of being well into my career yet still feeling a bit unsatisfied, and having similar emotions in relationships." The title Sink Your Teeth references a wild animal and represented the smoothness and rawness the album captured.

== Promotion ==
The band released their lead single, "Favorite Daze", in May 2023 and the music video was released in June 2023. Three more singles were reased prior to the album release on September 20, 2024. The band promoted the album on their "Sink Your Teeth Tour", which toured between 2024 and 2025.

== Track listing ==
All tracks are written by Tyler Glenn, with Dan Book and Joe Janiak where noted.

No.	Title	Writer(s)	Length
1.	"Favorite Daze"	Glenn; Janiak	3:28
2.	"Secret"	Glenn; Book	2:53
3.	"Bad Dreams"	Glenn; Book	2:49
4.	"Recover"	Glenn; Book	3:15
5.	"Heaven"	Glenn; Book	3:17
6.	"El Diablo"	Glenn; Janiak	3:44
7.	"Past Life"	Glenn; Book	3:33
8.	"Paper Cuts"	Glenn; Book	3:30
9.	"Cruel Intentions"	Glenn; Book	2:46
10.	"Acting"	Glenn	3:43
11.	"Leave"	Glenn; Book	3:44
12.	"Losing My Head"	Glenn; Janiak	3:20
Total length:			40:08

== Personnel ==
- Tyler Glenn – lead vocals, backing vocals, keyboards, synthesizers, programming
- Branden Campbell – bass, backing vocals
- Christopher Allen – guitars, backing vocals
- Elaine Bradley – drums, percussion, backing vocals
