= Excommunication (album) =

Album by Tyler Glenn

Studio album by Tyler Glenn
- Released: October 21, 2016
- Genres: Pop rock; new wave; synthpop; electropop
- Length: 50:44
- Label: Island
- Producers: Tim Pagnotta, Tyler Glenn, Nate Pyfer

Singles from Excommunication
- 1. "Shameless" Released: August 12, 2016

Excommunication is the first solo album by Neon Trees singer Tyler Glenn, released on October 21, 2016, by Island Records. The title of the album refers to Glenn leaving the Church of Jesus Christ of Latter-day Saints (LDS Church) in November 2015.

== Background & Composition ==
The origin of the album was the LDS Church's 2015 decision to issue controversial policy changes restricting membership of LGBTQ parents and their children. Glenn says that the album is a story of how he grappled with losing his boyfriend at the same time that he was losing his faith because of the new LDS policy on excluding queer people. As Glenn explained in a Vice interview,

Sometimes I'm talking to God, but a lot of times I'm talking to my ex throughout the record. The title Excommunication is a play on words, if you look at it that way: religious excommunication, as well as communicating with my ex.

While Glenn approached the album as being a traditional rock exercise in expressing heartbreak, he overlay that thematic with a second lyrical concern regarding his Church's regressive work against queer people.

Glenn describes a key question guiding his lyrical exploration, leading him to ask: "How was this God that I felt like I had a relationship with -- how could he tell the leaders of the church to put out this new doctrine against gay people?" The album reveals the singer seeking and failing to find an answer to that question.

Life gets so fucking fun when you unwire the shame and guilt about who you are and tap into your core...There's so much strength and power already in you—and that's something I wish I had known, because I always looked to something else.

I see myself as an example of it never being too late to have this paradigm shift, never too late to welcome certain enlightenment.

— Tyler Glenn, on the album's message

We take a journey away from the "Mormon rock star" label and onto Glenn as he is now: a seeker still asking, only now with the ability to disbelieve—but, more to the point—and not know the rationale behind LDS teachings. As Glenn states,

In the Mormon Church, the narrative is that you know the church is true; it's all this I know, I know, I know. For me, it's so refreshing to not know—there's a liberation in not knowing right now.

The division between spiritual depth and contemporary rock sheen extends beyond the lyrics or subject matter, as the sound of the album combines the genre hallmarks of praise with a The album was described by Out as a "blend of synth-heavy electro jams and ballads that are equal parts Depeche Mode and Peter Gabriel." The single "John, Give 'Em Hell" was written in support of John Dehlin.

== Release and promotion ==
The debut single from the album, "Trash," was accompanied by a music video. The single "Shameless" was accompanied by a music video denouncing the LDS Church. The album was released digitally on October 21, 2016. it was never issued in physical format on CD nor Vinyl Glenn performed the single "Midnight" on Live with Kelly and Ryan.

== Critical reception ==
Professional ratings
Review scores
| Source | Rating |
|---|---|
| AllMusic | 4/5 stars |

In reference to the music video for "Trash," Brittany Spanos of Rolling Stone said "Glenn’s performance in the video is violent and incendiary, mirroring his troubled relationship with his religion. He spits out lyrics that reflect the self-loathing he felt upon hearing the ban on members of the LGBTQ community in the LDS Church last year." Chris Gerard of Washington Blade stated that the album "is as electrifying and upbeat as anything Neon Trees might have produced and boasts the added poignancy of exploring Glenn literally losing his religion."

== Track listing ==
Excommunication track listing
| No. | Title | Length |
|---|---|---|
| 1. | "Sudden Death (OMG)" | 3:19 |
| 2. | "G.D.M.M.L. GRLS" | 4:03 |
| 3. | "Trash" | 3:36 |
| 4. | "Gods + Monsters" | 4:18 |
| 5. | "Gates" | 3:55 |
| 6. | "Shameless" | 3:31 |
| 7. | "Waiting Around" | 3:49 |
| 8. | "First Vision" | 4:18 |
| 9. | "Midnight" | 3:39 |
| 10. | "One More" | 3:48 |
| 11. | "Black Light" | 4:21 |
| 12. | "John, Give 'Em Hell" | 2:49 |
| 13. | "Devil" | 5:30 |
