= Start a Fire (Neon Trees EP) =

EP by Neon Trees
- Released: 2009
- Length: 18:22
- Label: Self-released
- Producer: Scott Wiley

Neon Trees chronology
Start a Fire (2009)	Habits (2010)

Start a Fire was the first official release of the American rock band Neon Trees. The EP was available for sale only at shows during their late 2009 tour supporting Nico Vega and was limited to one pressing of 500 units.

All the tracks on the EP were recorded at Microphone Action Squad in Orem, Utah and were produced and engineered by Scott Wiley.

A video for the unofficial single, "Calling My Name", was shot at Muse Music in Provo, Utah.

"Phones" is one of the oldest Neon Trees tracks, dating back to before Elaine and Branden were in the group.

== Track listing ==
All lyrics are written by Tyler Glenn; all music is composed by Neon Trees.

No.	Title	Length
1.	"Calling My Name"	3:22
2.	"The Death of You and Me"	3:44
3.	"Attraction"	3:24
4.	"Phones"	3:59
5.	"Alarm"	3:52

== Personnel ==
- Tyler Glenn – vocals, synths
- Chris Allen – guitars, vocals
- Branden Campbell – bass, vocals
- Elaine Bradley – drums, vocals
