= Pop Psychology (album) =

Studio album by Neon Trees
- Released: April 22, 2014
- Genre: Pop rock; new wave; synth-pop
- Length: 36:22
- Label: Mercury, Def Jam
- Producer: Tim Pagnotta

Neon Trees chronology
Picture Show (2012)	Pop Psychology (2014)	I Can Feel You Forgetting Me (2020)

Singles from Pop Psychology
- 1. "Sleeping with a Friend" Released: January 11, 2014; 2. "I Love You (But I Hate Your Friends)" Released: March 25, 2014; 3. "First Things First" Released: April 8, 2014; 4. "Text Me in the Morning" Released: June 17, 2014

Pop Psychology is the third studio album by American rock band Neon Trees. The lead single, "Sleeping with a Friend", was released on January 11, 2014, and the album was released on April 22, 2014. The record is based on and is the cathartic product of lead singer, Tyler Glenn’s therapy sessions. Glenn started seeing a therapist after canceling some tour dates in 2012 while the band promoted their second record, Picture Show, due to trying to find himself mentally and figure out who he was. "At moments there's a cry for help and sadness...But I think it's a real fun pop record at the heart of it and something with a message too", he said of his band's third album. Also addressed in the album's lyricism from Glenn's therapy sessions are his sexuality and sex, in general.

== Promotion ==
The band released their lead single, "Sleeping with a Friend", in January 2014 and the music video was released on the 24th of that month. The band performed the song on The Tonight Show with Jay Leno on January 22, 2014. The single peaked at No. 51 on the U.S. Billboard charts.

Their second single, "I Love You (But I Hate Your Friends)", was released on March 25, 2014, along with the music video in the same day. On April 9, 2014, the band performed both singles on Jimmy Kimmel Live!, as well as having a minor guest appearance in a skit.

The band announced they would be releasing other new songs leading up to the April 22 release of Pop Psychology and on April 1, 2014, released a promotional video for the track, "Voices in the Halls." April 8, 2014, saw the release of another new song as a promotional single from the album, "First Things First." "Text Me in the Morning" was released on June 17, 2014.

The band promoted the album on their "Pop Psychology Tour", which started in April and ended in July.

== Critical reception ==
Professional ratings
Aggregate scores
Source	Rating
Metacritic	58/100
Review scores
Source	Rating
AllMusic	4/5 stars
Alternative Press	3.5/5 stars
Entertainment Weekly	B+
Knoxville News Sentinel	3.5/5 stars
Magnet	(2/10)
Newsday	A−
Rolling Stone	3/5 stars
USA Today	3/4 stars

Pop Psychology received generally mixed reviews from critics. At Entertainment Weekly, Kyle Anderson graded the album a B+, remarking how the release "a 40-minute master class in the kind of pop that moves both the body and the brain." Jerry Shriver of USA Today rated the album three stars out of four, stating that "these witty, bright and relentlessly danceable tunes also explore plenty of universal young-adult angst." At Alternative Press, Evan Lucy rated the album three-and-a-half stars out of five, writing that the album comes with "no surprises", which he says the cover artwork "should tip you off to that" because the release "is a slick, synthed-up, unabashed party." Heather Phares of AllMusic rated the album four stars out of five, remarking that "Even if Neon Trees sometimes try a little too hard to be serious on Pop Psychology, it's some of their most heartfelt music and some of their finest."

Glenn Gamboa of Newsday graded the album an A−, remarking how Neon Trees are "Packing pop with deeper personal meaning." The Knoxville News Sentinel's Chuck Campbell rated the album three-and-a-half stars out of five, stating that "Apparently, Glenn still has some things to sort out." At Milwaukee Journal Sentinel, Piet Levy gave a positive review of the album, writing that "the band has never sounded so consistently confident and free." Kate Padilla of The Spencer Daily Reporter gave a positive review of the album, stating that the release is "quite the experience to listen to" that "is proof alone Neon Trees has not lost any of their musical power."

At Rolling Stone, Jon Dolan rated the album three stars out of five, saying that "Pop Psychology opens with the biggest, shiniest songs he's come up with, each taking on a slippery aspect of post-modern romance." Matt Sullivan of Magnet rated the album two out of ten stars, calling the release simply "terrible". At The Boston Globe, Luke O'Neil gave a mixed review, stating that the release "seem to have split the difference on their third effort", which is "not always good news."

== Commercial performance ==
Pop Psychology sold 19,000 copies in the United States its first week, debuting at the top spot of Billboard's Top Rock Albums chart and number six of the Billboard 200.

== Track listing ==
All tracks are written by Tyler Glenn and Tim Pagnotta, except where noted.

No.	Title	Writer(s)	Length
1.	"Love in the 21st Century"		3:25
2.	"Text Me in the Morning"		3:05
3.	"Sleeping with a Friend"		3:48
4.	"Teenager in Love"		3:17
5.	"I Love You (But I Hate Your Friends)"		3:16
6.	"Unavoidable"	Glenn; Elaine Bradley	3:57
7.	"Voices in the Halls"		2:59
8.	"Foolish Behavior"		3:51
9.	"Living in Another World"	Glenn; Campbell; Allen; Bradley	3:42
10.	"First Things First"	Glenn	5:06
Total length:			36:22

iTunes bonus track
No.	Title	Writer(s)	Length
11.	"American Zero"	Glenn; Campbell; Allen; Bradley	3:01
Total length:			39:23

== Personnel ==
Neon Trees

- Tyler Glenn – lead vocals, backing vocals, keyboards, synthesizers, programming
- Branden Campbell – bass, backing vocals
- Christopher Allen – guitars, backing vocals
- Elaine Bradley – drums, percussion, backing vocals

Production

- Ted Jensen – mastering at Sterling Sound, New York City

== Release history ==
Country	Release date
United States	April 22, 2014
Australia	April 22, 2014
United Kingdom	July 14, 2014

== Charts ==
Chart performance for ...
Chart	Peak position
US Billboard 200	6
US Top Alternative Albums (Billboard)	1
US Top Rock Albums (Billboard)	1
