= Sleeping with a Friend =

Single by Neon Trees

from the album Pop Psychology
- Released: January 11, 2014
- Recorded: 2013
- Genre: Pop rock; soft rock; new wave
- Length: 3:48
- Label: Mercury
- Songwriters: Tyler Glenn; Tim Pagnotta

Neon Trees singles chronology
"Lessons in Love (All Day, All Night)" (2012)	"Sleeping with a Friend" (2014)	"I Love You (But I Hate Your Friends)" (2014)

"Sleeping with a Friend" is a song written and performed by American rock band Neon Trees. It was originally recorded by the band for their third studio album, Pop Psychology (2014). The song was released as the first single from Pop Psychology on January 11, 2014.

== Background ==
According to Tyler Glenn, "Sleeping with a Friend" was inspired from the album So by Peter Gabriel. Glenn stated "Sonically speaking it's our biggest-sounding song to date".

== Reception ==
Heather Allen at Mind Equals Blown describes it as a catchy song, stating "The keyboard and drums thrown into the spotlight with the guitars subtle in the background is truly what gives "Sleeping With a Friend" its old-school feel."

== Track listing ==
Digital download
No.	Title	Length
1.	"Sleeping with a Friend"	3:48

== Charts ==
=== Weekly charts ===
Chart (2014)	Peak position
Canada Hot 100 (Billboard)	69
Canada AC (Billboard)	49
Canada CHR/Top 40 (Billboard)	42
Canada Hot AC (Billboard)	38
Canada Rock (Billboard)	50
US Billboard Hot 100	51
US Hot Rock & Alternative Songs (Billboard)	8
US Rock & Alternative Airplay (Billboard)	18
US Adult Alternative Airplay (Billboard)	14
US Adult Contemporary (Billboard)	24
US Adult Pop Airplay (Billboard)	7
US Alternative Airplay (Billboard)	12
US Dance Club Songs (Billboard)	20
US Pop Airplay (Billboard)	20

=== Year-end charts ===
Chart (2014)	Position
US Hot Rock Songs (Billboard)	18
US Rock Airplay (Billboard)	49
US Adult Alternative Songs (Billboard)	49
US Adult Top 40 (Billboard)	30
US Alternative Songs (Billboard)	30

=== Certifications ===
Region	Certification	Certified units/sales
United States (RIAA)	Gold	500,000^{‡}
^{‡} Sales+streaming figures based on certification alone.

== Personnel ==
Neon Trees

- Tyler Glenn – lead vocals, piano, synthesizer
- Christopher Allen – guitar, backing vocals
- Branden Campbell – bass, backing vocals
- Elaine Bradley – drums, backing vocals

== Release history ==
Country	Date	Format	Label
Canada	January 11, 2014	Digital download	Mercury Records
Mexico	January 11, 2014	Digital download	Mercury Records
United States	January 11, 2014	Digital download	Mercury Records
Belgium	January 12, 2014	Digital download	The Island Def Jam Music Group
Bolivia	January 12, 2014	Digital download	The Island Def Jam Music Group
Brazil	January 12, 2014	Digital download	The Island Def Jam Music Group
Chile	January 12, 2014	Digital download	The Island Def Jam Music Group
France	January 12, 2014	Digital download	The Island Def Jam Music Group
Netherlands	January 12, 2014	Digital download	The Island Def Jam Music Group
Sweden	January 12, 2014	Digital download	The Island Def Jam Music Group
United States	January 21, 2014	Alternative radio	Mercury Records, Island Records
United States	February 25, 2014	Contemporary hit radio	Mercury Records, Island Records
United Kingdom	August 3, 2014	Digital download	The Island Def Jam Music Group
