= The Island Def Jam Music Group =

American record label group formed in 1998

Island Def Jam Music Group
- Parent company: Universal Music Group
- Founded: December 31, 1998; 27 years ago
- Defunct: April 1, 2014; 12 years ago
- Status: Relaunched as Republic Corps
- Distributors: Republic (United States); EMI (UK); Universal Music Group (International); Polydor (France)
- Genre: Various
- Country of origin: United States
- Location: 29th floor, 825 8th Avenue, Worldwide Plaza, Midtown Manhattan, New York City, New York, U.S.
- Official website: www.universalmusic.com/label/def-jam/

The Island Def Jam Music Group (also simply known as Island Def Jam or by its acronym IDJMG) was an American record label group formed on December 31, 1998, by Universal Music Group. Prior to 2014, Island Def Jam included labels originally established under the umbrellas of Island Records and Def Jam Recordings. On April 1, 2014, Universal Music Group publicly announced the dissolution of the Def Jam Group, leaving IDJMG and its affiliated subsidiaries as separate sister labels. In 2024, Universal Music aligned Island and Def Jam with Republic Records, under a new structure labeled as Republic Corps.

== History ==
=== 1999: Seagram buyout of PolyGram and unit formation ===
On December 10, 1998, the Seagram Company acquired PolyGram for $10.6 billion and merged its music label unit with that of MCA Music, forming Universal Music Group.

In 1999, following the formation of Universal Music Group, 14 recording labels, including Island Records, Def Jam Recordings, and Mercury Records, merged to form Island Def Jam Music Group. Although Island Def Jam Music Group consolidated the labels, they continued to operate as separate, autonomous labels. Lyor Cohen was named the unit’s president.

Island Def Jam Music Group was one of four newly established Universal Music label groups, along with the Universal Motown Republic Group, Verve Label Group, and Interscope Geffen A&M Records.

In the United Kingdom, Island Records operated under Universal’s Island Records Group, while Def Jam UK was established and distributed by Mercury, which also managed its artists under the same banner. U.S. distribution was later revoked by the Island Def Jam Music Group.

=== 1999–2001: Early success ===
The Island Def Jam Music Group’s first official release was Biohazard’s New World Disorder, issued by Mercury Records on June 8, 1999. At that time, the Rush Associated Labels portfolio, a holding ground for Def Jam, had been absorbed into Island Def Jam along with most of its affiliated labels, including Def Soul, Roc-A-Fella, and Murder Inc. Records. The labels were consolidated under the Island Def Jam umbrella during the PolyGram era, 1996 –1998. Some Island Def Jam divisions – such as 4th & B'way Records and Island Black Music – were sold off or folded into IDJMG, and many artists, including hip-hop and R&B acts, were transferred to Def Jam.

Mercury’s artists were later reassigned to other labels depending on genre: Motown (unrelated to Island Def Jam Music Group until 2011), Def Jam (urban), or Island (pop, rock, alternative, or other non-urban genres). Some of Mercury’s non-urban roster remained with the label, while parts of its international divisions either remained active or were folded (including Mercury UK, which oversaw Def Jam or Island US releases).

In 2000, the unit launched Def Jam Germany, the first international Def Jam label. The following year, the country music label, Lost Highway Records, was formed. The label operated as an imprint of Mercury Records before moving to Universal Music’s Nashville division after IDJMG’s dissolution in 2014. In the summer of 2001, Island Def Jam acquired a controlling interest in the rock label Roadrunner Records. Edel SE & Co. KGaA, a German music distributor that owned 17% of Roadrunner at the time, indicated its intention to pursue legal action against Universal.

At the turn of the 21st century, the label saw strong commercial performance with releases by LL Cool J, Method Man and Redman, DMX, and N.O.R.E..

=== 2002–2009: Restructure, Murder Inc. problems, Roc-A-Fella buyout, and new leadership ===
In early 2002, the Island Def Jam bought Mariah Carey's label under contract with future Universal Music Group sister label Virgin Records. By the end of 2003, Fefe Dobson, Everlast, and Patti LaBelle became part of the unit.

In July 2002, Island Def Jam released Murder Inc. Records' second compilation album, Irv Gotti Presents: The Inc. The album peaked in the top 3 of the Billboard 200, and was certified Gold by the RIAA. On January 3, 2003, the label unit was forced to cut all ties with producer Irv Gotti and his label, Murder Inc. Records, after a federal investigation and office raid over allegations of money laundering in connection to an illegal operation.

On March 25, 2003, Island Def Jam released the debut album Diplomatic Immunity by the rap group The Diplomats. Although the album did not generate major chart-topping hits, the singles received moderate success, contributing to its Gold certification by the RIAA. In May, Island Def Jam received a cease and desist from Steve Gottlieb, founder of TVT Records, regarding the release of a Cash Money Click reunion album, which IDJMG restricted because of member Ja Rule's obligations with Def Jam.

President Lyor Cohen implored Gotti and Ja Rule not to record the album for TVT, but he instead obliged for Island Def Jam and Universal Music Group to distribute the album to avoid a conflict of interest. TVT's lawsuit cites copyright infringement, fraud, and tortious interference. Ultimately, TVT was awarded $132 million in damages, with Cohen found liable for $56 million. This decision was revised two years later, and TVT's cash award was reduced to $126,000 after Island Def Jam successfully appealed the judgement, claiming the situation was not fraud nor infringement, but instead a breach of contract.

On December 9, 2003, Fefe Dobson released her self-titled debut on the same day as Def Soul artists 112's Hot & Wet and Musiq Soulchild's Soulstar. In May 2004, Everlast and LaBelle released White Trash Beautiful under Island and Timeless Journey under Def Soul Classics, respectively. At the same time, L.A. Reid was appointed president and CEO of the IDJMG after he was dismissed from Arista Records. Cohen left Island Def Jam to join Warner Music Group, bringing colleagues Kevin Liles and Julie Greenwald with him.

In December 2004, the unit acquired the remaining 50% interest in Roc-A-Fella Records in exchange for appointing co-founder Jay-Z as president of Def Jam Recordings; the other 50% had been purchased by PolyGram, Def Jam's former parent company, in 1997. As a result, fellow Roc-A-Fella cohorts Damon Dash and Kareem "Biggs" Burke were forced off the label. Then, in early 2005, the group extended a new label deal renewal with Ludacris' Disturbing tha Peace, making IDJMG a 50 percent stakeholder. In April, with L.A. Reid's leadership, Mariah Carey returned from a two-year hiatus with The Emancipation of Mimi. The album sold 404,000 copies in its first week and received widespread acclaim from critics. That same year, Island Def Jam signed a newcomer, Barbadian singer Rihanna, whose debut single "Pon de Replay" achieved rapid commercial success upon release.

In 2005, Island Def Jam formed Stolen Transmission, an imprint label aimed at promoting indie and alternative rock acts. Founded by Rob Stevenson, then an A&R executive at Island Def Jam, it lasted two years without any major commercial or critical success and is now defunct. Acts signed to the sub-label included The Audition, The Horrors, Innerpartysystem, Monty Are I, The Photo Atlas, and Schoolyard Heroes.

In 2006, IDJMG ended its partnership with Roadrunner Records and sold the label to Warner Music. Shakir Stewart was appointed senior vice president of A&R in October. A year later, Steve Bartels was appointed chairman and COO of Island Def Jam, reporting to L.A. Reid and then-CEO of Universal Music, Doug Morris. On December 22, 2007, Jay-Z vacated his presidency of Def Jam, prompting L.A. Reid to step in rather than find a replacement. On November 1, 2008, Shakir Stewart committed suicide, vacating his positions as senior vice president of A&R at Island Def Jam and executive vice president of Def Jam. He was posthumously replaced by Christopher Hicks, a former executive from Warner Music Group.

=== 2010–11: Motown induction and GOOD Music partnership ===
Throughout 2010, Island Def Jam generated more public success from Justin Bieber ("Baby"), Kanye West (My Beautiful Dark Twisted Fantasy) and Rihanna ("Only Girl (In the World)").

In 2011, former RCA/Jive Label Group chairman Barry Weiss was assigned to become the new chairman of the Universal Motown Republic Group while at the same time assuming the CEO position at Island Def Jam Music Group. Under Weiss' leadership, Motown Records became an imprint of the IDJMG shortly after the disbandment of the UMRG. Kanye West's imprint, GOOD Music, was given a 10-year distribution partnership with IDJMG. GOOD Music assumed marketing, while Def Jam took over the manufacturing and distribution of its releases. The first official album released under the new partnership was Big Sean's debut, Finally Famous. In May, Def Soul Records was folded into Island Def Jam as a part of a rearrangement of the Island Def Jam Music Group's multi-genre strategy.

In August 2011, Jay-Z and Kanye West's collaborative album Watch the Throne was released under Island Def Jam's distribution. The album sold 436,000 copies in its first week, reportedly recorded the highest first-week sales for a hip-hop album in 2011 and also the recorded highest for IDJMG since Mariah Carey's 2005 album The Emancipation of Mimi.

=== 2013: Final output ===
In 2013, Fall Out Boy, Iggy Azalea, and Neon Trees continued to perform well commercially at the unit, with Fall Out Boy's Save Rock and Roll accumulating 154,000 copies sold and debuting at number one on Billboard. Iggy Azalea's single, "Change Your Life," was additionally certified Gold by the RIAA, despite debuting at number 47 on the Billboard Hot R&B/Hip-Hop Songs chart. Neon Trees' single, "Sleeping with a Friend," reached the number seven position on the Adult Top 40, indicating favorable reception.

The Island Def Jam Music Group's operations in the United Kingdom were further changed, with Mercury UK being absorbed into the new Virgin EMI Records. With the absorption of Mercury UK also involved the end of Def Jam UK, with all of Island, Def Jam, Republic, Virgin, and Motown's artists being distributed under the newly reiterated imprint in the region. It occurred following UMG's acquisition of the recording music division of EMI a year earlier.

=== 2014: Disbandment ===
On April 1, 2014, Lucian Grainge, chairman and CEO of the Universal Music Group, confirmed the formal disbandment of the Island Def Jam Music Group. The group was disbanded in April 2014, and its labels were reorganized under Universal Music Group. The unit ceased to exist after East Coast label faction CEO Barry Weiss' departure. Grainge explained:

"No matter how much we might work to build 'IDJ' as a brand, that brand could never be as powerful as each of IDJ's constituent parts. At UMG, our labels are empowered to be entrepreneurial and take creative risks. By re-establishing Def Jam, Island and Motown as standalone labels within the UMG family, we're positioning them to recapture the uniqueness of their brands and serve artists with the singularity of vision, focus and creativity that was at the core of their original success. Barry is a terrific music executive who led our East Coast labels during a critical time of transition. I can't say enough about his contributions to our labels or to thank him enough. He has positioned Def Jam, Island, Motown and Republic to where they are today — poised for even greater levels of success — and we'd love to keep him in the family. He has stepped down in order to enter into discussions with UMG about a new venture together. Barry is an exceptional music executive, and I'm enormously grateful for all of his invaluable contributions during a time of transition for our East Coast companies."

It was believed that Weiss was dissatisfied with the fact that he would be demoted at Universal Music, with Michele Anthony being promoted to executive vice president at the company's recorded music unit and John Janick replacing Jimmy Iovine as chairman and CEO of Island Def Jam's sister unit, Interscope Geffen A&M. Weiss was also in talks with Grainge to create a new joint venture with UMG.

With Island Def Jam disbanded, operations had been traced solely into all three label units: Def Jam Recordings and Island Records would act as their own labels under Universal Music, with Def Jam remaining a sister label, albeit with more distant ties. Motown Records currently operates under the Capitol Music Group. Mercury Records had folded into Island following the closure, but was reactivated in 2022 by Universal Music and later moved to Republic Records.

In terms of corporate leadership, Steve Bartels was reassigned to CEO of Def Jam until 2018, David Massey remained president and CEO of Island (until 2018), and Ethiopia Habtemariam was named president of Motown before leaving in 2022. As of 2022, despite the shutdown, there remains a Facebook and Instagram joint account, and Universal Music France's sub-unit, called Island Def Jam France retains the unit name management from UMG France to promote both labels' music. IDJ France also promotes and produces releases under sister labels Capitol, Motown, Virgin Music, and Republic Records. Guenael "G.G." Fray has been appointed the deputy director of both IDJ and Polydor Records' French operations since January 2023.

Island Def Jam France concentrates on French-speaking artists, while international Island and Def Jam artists are distributed by Polydor.

=== 2024–present: Republic Corps ===
In 2024, Universal Music sister label Republic Records rebranded Island Def Jam Music Group under Republic Corps, as part of its core label strategy, renaming it Republic Corps. It was a scheme enforced by UMG to combine its labels, Republic, Island, and Def Jam, under the "East Coast" operation. Republic Corps and Universal's New York City label operations are under the supervision of Republic co-founder Monte Lipman.

== Awards and accolades ==
IDJMG was ranked as the top rhythmic label by Mediabase's 2012 airplay analysis, with seven number-one songs played on rhythmic radio stations, including songs from Rihanna, Kanye West, Jay-Z, Ne-Yo, and Justin Bieber.

== Labels ==
=== Island Records ===
- 4th & B'way Records
- Casablanca Records (pre-2000 and Chocolate City Records back catalogue)
- Monarc Entertainment
- Photo Finish Records (now operating under UMG's Virgin Music Label & Artist Services)
- Tuff Gong

=== Def Jam Recordings ===
- Disturbing tha Peace

=== Mercury Records ===
- EmArcy Records
- Limelight Records (catalogue now under control of Verve Records)
- Total Experience Records (1982-83 catalogue)
- Espoir records

=== Motown Records ===
- Motown Gospel

=== Other labels, divisions, or affiliate ===
- ARTium Records

=== Former or defunct ===
- American Recordings (now a division of UMG sister label Republic Records)
- Chemistry Records
- Def Con II
- Def Jamaica
- Def Jam Japan
- Def Jam UK
- Def Jam South
- Def Soul
  - Def Soul Classics
- Capricorn Records (second incarnation)
- GOOD Music
- Intrepid Records
- Island Black Music
- Island Urban Music
- Lost Highway Records (currently a part of the Universal Music Group Nashville division)
- Margaritaville Records
- Mercury Classics (renamed Mercury KX in 2016)
- Mercury International (United Kingdom and Australian operations folded; Mercury France and Tokyo still active)
- Mercury Nashville (currently a part of the Universal Music Group Nashville division)
- Murder Inc. Records
- Radio Killa Records
- Roadrunner Records (currently a division of Warner Music's 300 Elektra Entertainment)
- Roc-A-Fella Records
- Roc-La-Familia
- The Rocket Record Company
- Rush Associated Labels
- Russell Simmons Music Group
- Smash Records
- So So Def Recordings (distribution deal)
- Tag Records (partnership with TAG Body Spray)
- Teen Island
- Vertigo Records (currently a part of the Mercury Records subset of Republic Records)
- Wing Records

== Notable artists before dissolution ==
- Adrienne Bailon
- Ashanti
- August Alsina
- Beanie Sigel (Island Def Jam/Def Jam/Roc-A-Fella)
- Big Sean
- Bob Marley
- Cameo
- Cam'ron (Island Def Jam/Diplomats/Roc-A-Fella)
- Christina Milian
- The Diplomats (Island Def Jam/Diplomats/Roc-A-Fella)
- DMX (Island Def Jam/Def Jam/Ruff Ryders)
- Dru Hill
- Elton John
- Eric B
- Fall Out Boy
- Frank Ocean
- Hikaru Utada
- Iggy Azalea
- Insane Clown Posse
- Janet Jackson
- Ja Rule (Island Def Jam/Def Jam/Murder Inc.)
- Jay-Z
- Jennifer Lopez
- Jessie James
- Johnny Cash
- Juelz Santana (Island Def Jam/Def Jam//Roc-A-Fella)
- Justin Bieber
- Kanye West
- Katy Perry
- The Killers
- Kerli
- Lionel Richie
- LL Cool J
- Lloyd (Island Def Jam/Murder Inc.)
- Logic
- Ludacris (Island Def Jam/Def Jam South/Disturbing Tha Peace)
- Mariah Carey
- Method Man
- Memphis Bleek (Island Def Jam/Def Jam/Roc-A-Fella)
- The Mighty Mighty Bosstones
- My Darkest Days
- Madison Beer
- Ne-Yo
- Neon Trees
- Nickelback
- Patti LaBelle
- Primer 55
- Rakim
- Redman
- Rihanna
- Saliva
- Shania Twain
- Young Jeezy (Island Def Jam/Def Jam/Corporate Thugz)
