= I Can Feel You Forgetting Me =

Studio album by Neon Trees
- Released: July 24, 2020
- Genre: New wave; synth-pop
- Length: 33:39
- Label: Thrill Forever
- Producer: Dave Bassett; Micah Gordon; Mike Green; Cameron Hale; Joe Janiak; Nico Stadi

Neon Trees chronology
Pop Psychology (2014)	I Can Feel You Forgetting Me (2020)	Sink Your Teeth (2024)

Singles from I Can Feel You Forgetting Me
- 1. "Used to Like" Released: November 13, 2019; 2. "New Best Friend" Released: May 20, 2020; 3. "Mess Me Up" Released: July 10, 2020; 4. "Nights" Released: July 22, 2020

I Can Feel You Forgetting Me is the fourth studio album by American rock band, Neon Trees. It was released on July 24, 2020. This marks the group's first album release since 2014. This is also their only album to not be released on CD. This is also their first album to have the explicit content label on the cover.

== Background ==
The band released the lead single, "Used to Like" on November 13, 2019. The song peaked at number four on the US Alternative Airplay chart and number 17 on the US Rock Songs chart. The second single, "New Best Friend" was released on May 20, 2020. The song peaked at number 33 on the US Alternative Airplay chart. On July 10, 2020, the band released the third single called "Mess Me Up". The fourth and final single, "Nights", was released on July 22, 2020.

Singer Tyler Glenn stated that they started making the album in 2018. The band wrote around 40 songs for the album then narrowed it down to ten songs. Glenn also stated that the album "sounds like one full night of reflection, alone at the bar, walking past the places you’d go with them, texting them when you shouldn’t, and ultimately embracing the idea that no one else can complete you."

== Critical reception ==
Luke Wells of Soundigest called the album a departure from the band's "poppy tone" that made them famous in the early 2010s. He wrote that the production is glossy and that it has 1980s vibes. He wrote that the track, "Nights", "lays out the recurring theme of extensive reflection and struggles faced in transitioning your life out of a long-term relationship". He called "Everything Is Killing Me", "the strongest song on the album" because it is about the struggles from the use of substances that are faced during a breakup.

== Track listing ==
I Can Feel You Forgetting Me track listing
No.	Title	Writer(s)	Producer(s)	Length
1.	"Nights"	Tyler Glenn; Mike Green; Niko Hartikainen	Green; Nico Stadi	3:36
2.	"Used to Like"	Glenn; Green; Hartikainen	Green; Stadi	3:18
3.	"Holy Ghost"	Glenn; Dave Bassett	Bassett	3:13
4.	"Skeleton Boy"	Glenn; Micah Gordon	Gordon	2:55
5.	"Mess Me Up"	Glenn; Cameron Hale; Gordon	Hale; Gordon	3:16
6.	"Living Single"	Glenn; Green; Hartikainen	Green; Stadi	3:18
7.	"Everything Is Killing Me"	Glenn; Green; Hartikainen	Green; Stadi	3:12
8.	"Going Through Something"	Glenn; Hale; Gordon	Hale; Gordon	4:01
9.	"When the Night Is Over"	Glenn; Green; Hartikainen	Green; Stadi	3:10
10.	"New Best Friend"	Glenn; Joe Janiak	Janiak	3:19
Total length:				33:39

== Personnel ==
- Mike Green – producer (tracks 1, 2, 6, 7, 9), writer (tracks 1, 2, 6, 7, 9)
- Nico Stadi – producer (tracks 1, 2, 6, 7, 9)
- Niko Hartikainen – writer (tracks 1, 2, 6, 7, 9)
- Tyler Glenn – writer
- Chris Gehringer – masterer (track 2)
- Neal Avron – mixer (track 2)
- Dave Bassett – producer (track 3), writer (track 3)
- Micah Gordon – producer (tracks 4, 5, 8), writer (tracks 4, 5, 8)
- Cameron Hale – producer (tracks 5, 8), writer (tracks 5, 8)
- Joe Janiak – producer (track 10), writer (track 10)

== Charts ==
Chart performance for I Can Feel You Forgetting Me
Chart (2020)	Peak position
US Top Current Album Sales (Billboard)	56

== Release history ==
Release history for I Can Feel You Forgetting Me
Region	Date	Format	Label	Ref.
Various	July 24, 2020	Digital download; streaming	Thrill Forever	
Various	August 6, 2020	Vinyl	Thrill Forever	
