= Fire & Ice (Kaskade album) =

Studio album by Kaskade
- Released: October 25, 2011
- Genres: House; club; dance-pop; chill-out; downtempo; lounge
- Length: 88:34
- Label: Ultra Records
- Producers: Ryan Raddon, Finn Bjarnson, John Hancock, Steve Mitts, Neon Trees, Skrillex, Marcus Bently, Dada Life, Inpetto

Kaskade chronology
Dynasty (2010)	Fire & Ice (2011)	Atmosphere (2013)

Singles from Fire & Ice
- 1. "Eyes" Released: August 23, 2011; 2. "Turn It Down" Released: September 27, 2011; 3. "Room for Happiness" Released: February 7, 2012; 4. "Lick It" Released: April 17, 2012; 5. "Lessons in Love" Released: August 2012; 6. "Llove" Released: September 18, 2012

Fire & Ice is the seventh studio album by American DJ and producer Kaskade. It was released on October 25, 2011, in the United States through Ultra Records.

== Reception ==
Professional ratings
Review scores
Source	Rating
AllMusic	3.5/5 stars
Billboard	83/100
PopMatters	5/10

The album debuted at No. 17 on the Billboard Top 200 chart and at No. 1 on the Dance/Electronic Albums chart, becoming Kaskade's first number-one album on the latter. It also charted at No. 6 on the Digital Albums chart and No. 3 on the Independent Albums chart. The album received mixed reviews from mainstream critics.

Fire & Ice earned Kaskade his first Grammy nomination for Best Dance/Electronic Album in the 2013 Grammy Awards. Eventually, his next studio album Atmosphere met with similar success.

== Music videos ==
Most of the album's singles have supporting music videos (with the exceptions of "Lessons in Love" and "Llove").

=== "Eyes" ===
The music video for the song "Eyes" was uploaded to YouTube by the Ultra Records channel on September 13, 2011. The video features Mindy Gledhill singing, scenes of nature and city streets, usage of the mirroring effect and a 3D computer-animated eyeball, but it does not feature Kaskade.

=== "Turn It Down" ===
The music video for the track "Turn It Down" was uploaded to YouTube by Kaskade's VEVO channel on October 27, 2011. It features Rebecca & Fiona among others in scenes of ice-skating and raving. There are also scenes of colorful animated lips glowing in the dark syncing with the lyrics, referencing the single's cover art. Kaskade does not make an appearance in this video either.

=== "Room for Happiness" ===
There are two music videos for "Room for Happiness"; both were uploaded to YouTube by the Ultra Records channel on February 24, 2012.
The first video, subtitled "Fire" (as it is the version from the Fire disc of the album), features both Kaskade and, primarily, Skylar Grey. Kaskade is seen either DJing or watching Skylar Grey in a virtual-reality type room with a bed (alluding to the single's cover art) that he controls. Grey is seen singing in the room while it changes scenery. The scenery changes between a dark forest, a room of fire and a sunny desert (after the room walls break down).
The second video, for Kaskade's ICE Mix of the song, has a few differences. This version is over a minute longer and opens with Grey lying on the bed of the room while in the scenery of a burnt-down forest (not seen in the "Fire" video), and Kaskade opens in a different room instead of a hallway. Other things not seen in the "Fire" video are Grey laying her head on the rim of the bed (also alluding to the single's cover art) and singing to the camera knowing Kaskade is watching. The video for "Kaskade's ICE Mix", although, does not have the scenes of Kaskade DJing, the room of fire or Grey singing in the sunny desert room (because the "walls" break down at the end of the video instead of the middle).

=== "Lick It" ===
The music video for "Lick It" was uploaded to YouTube by the Ultra Records channel on April 18, 2012. This video does not include Kaskade or Skrillex, but instead a woman in a snow-filled area, presumably on a "green screen". As she is walking, and as the song progresses, blood is getting sucked into her head, causing her pain. She keeps her hands over her ears during most of the video due to this. When she asks for help, she is avoided. She tries to chase down a man with headphones to help her, but he flees. Afterwards, it is shown that time is actually in a reversed flow in the place around her (noticeably because the blood actually came from her ears and was left on the snow and the snow from her shoe print goes back in place as she steps on it). After breaking through a window to retrieved headphones, the pain stops as she notices people around her starting to go outside.

== Track listing ==
All songs written, produced and arranged by Ryan Raddon, Finn Bjarnson and John Hancock.

Disc 1: Fire
No.	Title	Writer(s)	Producer(s)	Length
1.	"Eyes" (featuring Mindy Gledhill)			5:15
2.	"Turn It Down" (with Rebecca & Fiona)	Steve Mitts, Rebecca Scheja, Fiona Fitzpatrick	Mitts	5:13
3.	"Lessons in Love" (featuring Neon Trees)	Tyler Glenn, Branden Campbell, Elaine Bradley, Chris Allen	Glenn, Campbell, Bradley, Allen	4:08
4.	"Lick It" (with Skrillex)	Sonny Moore	Moore	3:34
5.	"Llove" (featuring Haley)	Mitts	Mitts	4:39
6.	"Let Me Go" (featuring Marcus Bentley)	Bently	Bently	4:32
7.	"Waste Love" (featuring Quadron)	Coco O		4:35
8.	"ICE" (with Dada Life and Dan Black)	Black, Olle Corneér, Stefan Engblom	Corneér, Engblom	4:12
9.	"How Long" (with Inpetto and Late Night Alumni)	Becky Jean Williams, Dirk Duderstadt, Marco Duderstadt	D. Duderstadt, M. Duderstadt	5:11
10.	"Room for Happiness" (featuring Skylar Grey)	Grey		4:40

Disc 2: Ice
No.	Title	Length
1.	"Eyes" (Kaskade's ICE Mix) (featuring Mindy Gledhill)	3:31
2.	"Turn It Down" (Kaskade's ICE Mix) (with Rebecca & Fiona)	5:22
3.	"Lessons in Love" (Kaskade's ICE Mix)	3:51
4.	"Lick It" (Kaskade's ICE Mix) (with Skrillex)	4:29
5.	"Llove" (Kaskade's ICE Mix) (featuring Haley)	3:51
6.	"Let Me Go" (Kaskade's ICE Mix) (featuring Marcus Bentley)	3:20
7.	"Waste Love" (Kaskade's ICE Mix) (featuring Quadron)	4:03
8.	"ICE" (Kaskade's ICE Mix) (with Dada Life and Dan Black)	4:31
9.	"How Long" (Kaskade's ICE Mix) (with Inpetto and Late Night Alumni)	4:55
10.	"Room for Happiness" (Kaskade's ICE Mix) (featuring Skylar Grey)	4:55

== Credits and personnel ==
=== Sample credits ===
- "Lick It" contains a sample of Le Knight Club's remix of "Number Seven" by Raw Man. The sample credit was not listed in the liner notes.

=== Personnel ===
Credits adapted from AllMusic and Discogs.
Note: "Lessons in Love" is the only Fire disc track that does not share the same credits as its respective Ice disc track.

- Ryan Raddon (Kaskade) – producer, arranger, mixing, mastering, programming (all tracks), additional vocals in "Turn It Down" and "Let Me Go", keyboards, synthesizer
- Finn Bjarnson – producer, arranger, mixing, mastering, programming (all tracks except "Eyes", "Llove" and "Lessons in Love (Kaskade's ICE Mix)"), additional vocals in "Turn It Down" and "Let Me Go", guitar, keyboards, synthesizer, bass, Rhodes
- John Hancock – producer, arranger, programming (all tracks except "Let Me Go", "ICE" and "How Long"), additional vocals in "Let Me Go", guitar, keyboards, piano

=== Additional musicians ===
- Steve Mitts – programming in "Turn It Down" and "Llove", keyboards in "Llove", synthesizer in "Turn It Down"
- Sonny Moore – programming and synthesizer in "Lick It"
- Olle Cornéer – programming and synthesizer in "ICE"
- Stefan Engblom – programming and synthesizer in "ICE"
- Dirk Duderstadt – programming and keyboards in "How Long"
- Marco Duderstadt – programming and keyboards in "How Long"
- Branden Campbell – bass in "Lessons in Love"
- Elaine Bradley – drums in "Lessons in Love"
- Chris Allen – guitar in "Lessons in Love"
- Tyler Glenn – vocals in "Lessons in Love"
- Marcus Bentley – lead vocals, programming and Rhodes in "Let Me Go"
- Cameron Runyon – additional vocals in "Let Me Go"
- Coco – vocals in "Waste Love"
- Haley Gibby – vocals in "Llove"
- Rob Honey – bass in "Lick It"
- Todd Sorenson – drums in "Lick It"
- Rich Dixon – guitar in "Lick It"
- Brian Booth – saxophone in "Lick It"
- Lou Campbell – trombone in "Lick It"
- Reed LeChemenont – trumpet in "Lick It"
- Rebecca Moench – violin in "Lick It"
- Aaron Ashton – violin in "Lick It" and "Room for Happiness"
- Nicole Pinnell – cello in "Room for Happiness"

=== Managerial and design ===
- Chuck Anderson – artwork, design
- Joel Zimmerman – booking
- Edward Shapiro – legal advisor
- Stephanie LaFera – management
- Mark Owens – photography

=== Technical ===
- Mike Roskelley – mastering, mixing
- Scott Wiley – engineering in "Lessons in Love"

== Chart performance ==
Chart (2011)	Peak position
Japanese Albums (Oricon)	290
US Billboard 200	17
US Dance/Electronic Albums	1
US US Digital	6

== Release history ==
Region	Date	Label	Format
Australia	October 22, 2011	Onelove	Digital download
United States	October 25, 2011	Ultra Records	Digital download
United States	November 8, 2011	Ultra Records	CD
United States	April 3, 2012	Ultra Records	4×LP
