= Everybody Talks =

Single by Neon Trees

from the album Picture Show
- Released: December 20, 2011
- Recorded: 2011
- Genre: Pop rock; power pop
- Length: 2:59
- Label: Mercury, Def Jam
- Songwriters: Tyler Glenn, Tim Pagnotta
- Producer: Justin Meldal-Johnsen

Neon Trees singles chronology
"Your Surrender" (2011)	"Everybody Talks" (2011)	"Lessons in Love (All Day, All Night)" (2012)

Music videos
- "Everybody Talks" on YouTube; "Everybody Talks" (Animated version) on YouTube

"Everybody Talks" is the lead single from the second studio album, Picture Show, by American rock band Neon Trees. It was released on December 20, 2011, in the United States as a digital download on iTunes. It soon became a sleeper hit. The song made it to No. 6 on the Billboard Hot 100, making it their highest-charting single to date as well as their first Top 10 hit. The song was produced by Justin Meldal-Johnsen, engineered by Greg Collins, mixed by Billy Bush, and mastered by Joe LaPorta.

As of October 2012, the song has sold over 2 million digital downloads. It also hit No. 7 on the Alternative Songs chart, their first Top 10 hit after "Animal". It also hit No. 1 on the Adult Pop Songs, their first song to do so. In late July 2025, the song hit 1 billion streams on Spotify. This is the band's first-ever song to join the Spotify Billions Club.

"Everybody Talks" was inspired by early 1960s pop music; Tyler Glenn said that "We fell in love with a lot of like Roy Orbison and the Motown music that my dad listens to." Glenn later revealed via Twitter, during National Coming Out Day in 2020, that he had written the song while closeted about an ex-girlfriend who had spread rumors that he was gay.

== Reception ==
The song has received generally positive reviews from critics. PopCrush gave it 4 out of 5 stars, stating that "people can relate to 'Everybody Talks'." About.com said it was "a song that will work with a very wide audience".

== Music video ==
An animated music video to accompany the release of "Everybody Talks" was first released on YouTube on January 14, 2012, at a total length of three minutes and forty-two seconds.

The live-action music video for "Everybody Talks" was released on VEVO and YouTube on March 8, 2012. It features the band at a 1950s-esque drive-in watching a movie called Zombie Bikers From Hell. In the film, band members are playing music in a cabin when they are attacked by a group of zombies who are leather-clad motorcycle riders. Lead singer Tyler Glenn is the only one to escape, while the other band members are slaughtered by the zombies, offscreen, to the horror of the audience members at the drive-in.

Meanwhile, in the "real life" drive-in, a girl wearing red sunglasses starts seducing various male patrons. Once she and the men are alone in a secluded area, she reveals herself to be a fire-breathing vampire and eats them. In the film, Glenn hitches a ride from a girl in red sunglasses. As they drive off in a white van, Glenn's fate remains unknown. However, Glenn and the girl are present at the drive-in. The girl who drove up in the van at the end of the movie is in the same van the band drove up to the cabin in.

== In popular culture ==
- The song was covered by Jake Puckerman (Jacob Artist) and Kitty Wilde (Becca Tobin) for the 2012 Glee episode, "The Role You Were Born to Play".
- The song appeared in the 2012 movie American Reunion.
- The song was used in a 2012 Buick television commercial promoting the 2012 model of the Verano.
- The song was used in 2012 in the fifth episode of the second season of the American TV series Homeland.
- The song was used in 2012 uncredited in the third episode of the third season of the American TV series Hawaii Five-0.
- The song was used in 2013 in the ninth episode of the second season of the Australian TV series House Husbands.
- In 2014, the song was utilized in television and radio ad campaigns throughout Latin America for services provided by mobile phone operator, Movistar.
- The song appears as a playable track in Guitar Hero Live.
- The song appears as a playable DLC track in Rock Band 4.
- The song appears in the Russian television series Kitchen.

== Track listing ==
US digital download
No.	Title	Length
1.	"Everybody Talks"	2:59

== Charts ==
=== Weekly charts ===
Chart (2011–2013)	Peak position
Australia (ARIA)	10
Canada Hot 100 (Billboard)	35
Canada AC (Billboard)	44
Canada CHR/Top 40 (Billboard)	19
Canada Hot AC (Billboard)	15
Czech Republic Airplay (ČNS IFPI)	18
Czech Republic Singles Digital (ČNS IFPI)	90
Ireland (IRMA)	39
New Zealand (Recorded Music NZ)	37
US Billboard Hot 100	6
US Adult Contemporary (Billboard)	13
US Adult Pop Airplay (Billboard)	1
US Hot Rock & Alternative Songs (Billboard)	11
US Pop Airplay (Billboard)	3

=== Year-end charts ===
Chart (2012)	Position
US Billboard Hot 100	22
US Adult Contemporary (Billboard)	35
US Adult Top 40 (Billboard)	5
US Mainstream Top 40 (Billboard)	26
US Hot Rock Songs (Billboard)	26

Chart (2013)	Position
Australia (ARIA)	70

== Certifications ==
Region	Certification	Certified units/sales
Australia (ARIA)	2× Platinum	140,000^{^}
Brazil (Pro-Música Brasil)	Gold	30,000^{‡}
Denmark (IFPI Danmark)	Gold	45,000^{‡}
Germany (BVMI)	Gold	150,000^{‡}
New Zealand (RMNZ)	3× Platinum	90,000^{‡}
United Kingdom (BPI)	Platinum	600,000^{‡}
United States (RIAA)	7× Platinum	7,000,000^{‡}
^{^} Shipments figures based on certification alone.^{‡} Sales+streaming figures based on certification alone.

== Release history ==
Country	Date	Format	Label
United States	December 20, 2011- December 25, 2012	Digital download	Mercury
United States	April 17, 2012	Mainstream/Top 40	Mercury
