= Habits (album) =

2010 album by Neon Trees

Studio album by Neon Trees
- Released: March 16, 2010
- Genres: Alternative rock; dance-rock; new wave
- Length: 29:03
- Label: Mercury
- Producers: Ian Kirkpatrick, Tim Pagnotta

Neon Trees chronology
Start a Fire (2009)	Habits (2010)	Picture Show (2012)

Singles from Habits
- 1. "Animal" Released: March 16, 2010; 2. "1983" Released: September 28, 2010; 3. "Your Surrender" Released: February 22, 2011

Habits is the debut studio album by American rock band Neon Trees, released on March 16, 2010. The album's lead single, "Animal" was featured in several commercials, including those for Camp Vegas, and has reached number 13 on the Billboard Hot 100 and number one on the Alternative Rock chart. "1983" received a music video; the single was released on September 28, 2010.

== Critical reception ==
Professional ratings
Review scores
Source	Rating
AllMusic	3.5/5 stars
Contact Music	5/5 stars
Drowned in Sound	2/10 stars
idobi	3.5/5 stars
Rolling Stone	2.5/5 stars
Sputnikmusic	3/5 stars

Heather Phares from AllMusic wrote that Habits ran through the same kind of "hyper-literate lyrics and whip-smart hooks" just like the Killers did, but felt that the band lacked the "huge, and occasionally cumbersome, ambitions that Brandon Flowers and company possess", so instead they kept the album "focused and catchy, crafting unrepentantly slick songs with huge choruses, and where everything falls into place at exactly the expected moment". Contact Music's Nima Baniamer described "Animal" as "both brilliantly catchy but also epicly anthemic", and that the record "never seems to slow down", with hits after hits coming. The critic concluded her review by writing: "Rock, electro, indie, pop; there is something for everyone here." idobi Radio described all eight songs in Habits as "mix[ing] up the decades, combining for a fast-paced dance party reminiscent of the Strokes and Depeche Mode" which "provides a serious punch of slick pop rock all the way through, making up for its brevity". Jared Ponton from Sputnikmusic noted that the tracks on the album "bring the hooks hard and fast, destining themselves to be chart winners that might actually last a month on the alternative charts", but warned listeners to not "expect to find any profound and deeply thought-out phrases", with Neon Trees "opt[ing] to obey their so-called stereotype limitations by penning head absorbers, instead of clever lyrics".

In a mixed review, Christian Hoard of Rolling Stone commented that the tracks "wrap sparkling keyboards around angsty melodies and lyrics", but criticised "how hard the band tries" with "huge, pained choruses" which made the album "more Sam's Town than Hot Fuss — and that's not a good thing". BBC's Mike Diver criticised the formulaic composition of the songs set by the "commercially-sound, all bouncy keyboards and sing-along choruses" single "Animal", writing: "So many of these songs follow the same formula – slow starts, gentle builds, big middle sections, crackling climaxes, sudden fades – that they become indistinguishable from each other." He commented that lyrically the record worked fine "in a pop context", but still "misses the target enough to leave the listener remembering shortcomings over anything else". Robert Cooke from Drowned in Sound viewed Habits negatively and described it as a "cheap barrel of MOR indie rock, cloaked in pointless synths and empty sentiments, over-produced into oblivion", with "inane and childlike" hooks and "shallow" lyrics. The critic noted the "snippets of inspiration" in tracks such as "Sins of My Youth" and "In the Next Room", but nevertheless found that it "burps and farts itself into irrelevance in the same way".

== Track listing ==
All tracks are written by Tyler Glenn, except where noted.

No.	Title	Writer(s)	Length
1.	"Sins of My Youth"		3:38
2.	"Love and Affection"		3:03
3.	"Animal"	Glenn, Branden Campbell, Tim Pagnotta	3:32
4.	"Your Surrender"	Glenn, S*A*M, Sluggo	3:40
5.	"1983"	Glenn, Campbell, Pagnotta	3:42
6.	"Girls and Boys in School"		3:31
7.	"In the Next Room"	Glenn, Campbell, Pagnotta	3:49
8.	"Our War"		4:04
Total length:			29:03

ShockHound download bonus track
No.	Title	Length
9.	"Calling My Name"	3:22
Total length:		32:25

iTunes and non-US bonus tracks
No.	Title	Length
9.	"Helpless"	2:53
10.	"Farther Down"	5:16
Total length:		37:12

Australian iTunes bonus tracks
No.	Title	Length
11.	"Animal" (live from Apple Store 2010)	3:55
12.	"Animal" (music video)	3:22
Total length:		36:20

Japanese edition bonus track
No.	Title	Length
11.	"Animal" (DJs from Mars remix)	6:24

== Charts ==
Chart performance for Habits
Chart (2010–2011)	Peak position
Australian Albums (ARIA)	39
German Albums (Offizielle Top 100)	87
Scottish Albums (Official Charts)	58
UK Albums (Official Charts)	59
US Billboard 200	113
US Heatseekers Albums (Billboard)	1
US Top Alternative Albums (Billboard)	15
US Top Rock Albums (Billboard)	28

== Release history ==
Release history for Habits
Country	Release date
United States	March 16, 2010
Australia	February 18, 2011
United Kingdom	February 18, 2011
