= Paul Coy Allen =

- Origin: Paramount, California, U.S.
- Occupations: Director, producer, writer
- Years active: 2000;present
- Labels: production: Ten 2 One Entertainment

Paul Coy Allen is a filmmaker, television director television producer, and music video director.

== Early life ==
Born in Chicago, Illinois, Paul Coy Allen grew up an avid movie fan.

== Career ==
Allen began his career in 1998 at Tollin/Robbins Productions. His first job in the industry was on Nickelodeon's Kenan & Kel. He has worked for several television networks, including NBC, Comedy Central, HBO, Nickelodeon, and MTV.

In January 2007, Allen directed a 19-minute video montage for the Grammy-winning producer's stage performance during Justin Timberlake's FutureSex/LoveSound tour. The production has been acknowledged and summarized in various press and media columns including the March 2007 issue of GQ. Later that year, MTV's Total Request Live featured Timbaland's "Give It to Me" music video, directed by Allen. The song went on to top music charts in Ireland, New Zealand and Russia, and retained #1 spots in the U.S., United Kingdom and Canada. "Give It To Me" was named one of the "Top 10 hottest music videos for the summer of 2007" by MTV.

In Spring 2008, Allen directed two back to back music videos for Russian artist Emin Agalarov. The first video "Make The World", was shot in Palm Springs, California at the Morongo Casino. The second video "Stick Together", was shot in New Jersey and featured Agalarov's wife, Layla, daughter of Ilham Aliyev.

Allen formed Ten 2 One Entertainment with partners, Marcus Spence, and Phil Thornton based in Los Angeles, California.

In November 2009 Allen directed the music video for the first single off Timbaland's Shock Value II album, "Morning After Dark" featuring Soshy & Nelly Furtado. The concept was inspired by the film Twilight and the HBO series True Blood.

In December 2009, Allen went on to direct the music video for "Say Something" feat. Drake, and at the top of 2010 "If We Ever Meet Again" feat. Katy Perry both from Timbaland's Shock Value II album.

Allen became Executive Producer of the TV One network's R&B Divas starring Faith Evans, Nicci Gilbert, Syleena Johnson, Keke Wyatt, and Monifah. The series is being produced by Think Factory Media

Directed episode #19 #PeezyB of Nickelodeon's Sam & Cat starring Ariana Grande and Jennette McCurdy.

In 2019, he directed the music video of Westlife band's single "Dynamite".
