= Picture Show (album) =

Studio album by Neon Trees
- Released: April 17, 2012
- Genres: Pop rock; new wave; synth-pop; alternative rock
- Length: 46:30
- Label: Mercury
- Producer: Justin Meldal-Johnsen

Neon Trees chronology
Habits (2010)	Picture Show (2012)	Pop Psychology (2014)

Deluxe Edition

Singles from Picture Show
- 1. "Everybody Talks" Released: December 20, 2011; 2. "Lessons in Love (All Day, All Night)" Released: September 4, 2012; 3. "Weekend" Released: February 11, 2013

Picture Show is the second studio album by American rock band Neon Trees. The lead single, "Everybody Talks", was released on December 20, 2011, and the album was released on April 17, 2012. The music video for "Everybody Talks" was released on March 8, 2012.

On March 15, 2012, Neon Trees stated in an interview that Picture Show would have 11 tracks and 4 bonus tracks. On March 19, the cover art for Picture Show was released, and on March 27, the cover art for the deluxe edition was revealed on their livestream appearance, along with confirmation of a vinyl version that will available for the deluxe edition.

The album was produced by Justin Meldal-Johnsen, mixed by Billy Bush and engineered by Carlos de la Garza, Billy Bush and Greg Collins. It was mastered by Joe LaPorta.

"Everybody Talks" was used in the Homeland episode "Q&A". The episode aired on October 28, 2012.

"Moving in the Dark" was used in the NCIS episode "Namesake". The episode aired on October 30, 2012.

== Promotion ==
The band released their lead single, "Everybody Talks" in December 2011 and a video followed in early March 2012. The single peaked at number 6 on the Billboard Hot 100, and within the top 20 of 7 other major charts on Billboard.

The band also went on tour with AWOLNATION across the country, and has toured college campuses/festivals alone.

== Reception ==
Professional ratings
Aggregate scores
Source	Rating
Metacritic	63/100
Review scores
Source	Rating
AbsolutePunk	80%
AllMusic	3.5/5 stars
Alternative Press	3/5 stars
Billboard	4/5 stars
Entertainment Weekly	C+
idobi Radio	3.5/5 stars
Rolling Stone	3/5 stars

The album debuted at number 77 in Canada, and number 17 on the United States Billboard 200. Picture Show received generally mixed to positive reviews. At Metacritic, which assigns a normalized rating out of 100 to reviews from mainstream critics, the album received an average score of 63, based on 7 reviews, which indicates "generally favorable reviews". Billboard gave the album a mixed review, saying that Neon Trees were successful in keeping their new album similar to its predecessor, Habits, but their experimenting did not pay off (with songs like, "Trust" that last over 6 minutes). Similarly, Rolling Stone gave the album 3 stars out of 5, also saying that, "Four of its last five tracks exceed five minutes. Neon Trees clearly hope there's life beyond bubblegum". Entertainment Weekly gave the album a C+ grade.

== Track listing ==
All tracks are written by Tyler Glenn, except where noted.

No.	Title	Length
1.	"Moving in the Dark" (Glenn, Tim Pagnotta)	3:02
2.	"Teenage Sounds"	4:22
3.	"Everybody Talks" (Glenn, Pagnotta)	2:57
4.	"Mad Love"	3:10
5.	"Weekend" (Glenn, Pagnotta, Branden Campbell, Christopher Allen, Elaine Bradley)	4:35
6.	"Lessons in Love (All Day, All Night)" (Glenn, Campbell, Allen, Bradley, Ryan Raddon, Finn Bjarnson, John Hancock) (featuring Kaskade)	3:43
7.	"Trust"	6:05
8.	"Close to You"	5:05
9.	"Hooray for Hollywood" (Glenn, Sam Hollander, Dave Katz)	3:13
10.	"Still Young"	5:04
11.	"I Am the D.J." (includes hidden outro; Glenn, Hollander, Katz)	5:14
Total length:		46:30

Deluxe edition
No.	Title	Length
12.	"Show" (Glenn, Campbell, Allen, Bradley)	3:24
13.	"Tell Me You Love Me"	3:58
14.	"Take Me for a Ride" (Glenn, Campbell, Allen, Bradley)	5:38
Total length:		59:30

Physical-only deluxe edition bonus track
No.	Title	Length
15.	"Don't You Want Me" (Philip Oakey, Jo Callis, Philip Adrian Wright)	5:38
Total length:		65:08

iTunes deluxe edition bonus track
No.	Title	Length
16.	"Drop Your Weapon" (2007 demo; Glenn, Campbell, Allen, Bradley)	2:34
Total length:		67:42

== Personnel ==
Neon Trees

- Tyler Glenn – lead vocals, background vocals, keyboards, synthesizers, programming
- Branden Campbell – bass, background vocals
- Christopher Allen – guitars, background vocals
- Elaine Bradley – drums, percussion, background vocals, lead vocals on "Mad Love"

Additional musicians

- Justin Meldal Johnsen – guitars, keyboards, background vocals, programming, percussion
- Carlos de la Garza – percussion
- Kaskade – additional vocals & production on "Lessons In Love (All Day, All Night)"

Horn section

- David Ralicke – tenor saxophone, alto saxophone
- Jordan Katz – trumpet
- Steve Baxter – trombone

== Charts ==
Chart performance for Picture Show
Chart (2012)	Peak position
Canadian Albums (Nielsen SoundScan)	77
US Billboard 200	17
US Top Alternative Albums (Billboard)	5
US Top Rock Albums (Billboard)	9

== Certifications ==
Certifications for Picture Show
Region	Certification	Certified units/sales
New Zealand (RMNZ)	Gold	7,500^{‡}
^{‡} Sales+streaming figures based on certification alone.

== Release history ==
Release history for Picture Show
Country	Release date
United States	April 17, 2012
Australia	April 20, 2012
