= Animal (Neon Trees song) =

2010 debut single by Neon Trees

Single by Neon Trees

from the album Habits
- B-side: "Calling My Name"
- Released: March 16, 2010
- Recorded: 2009
- Genre: Pop-punk; dance-rock; indie rock
- Length: 3:32
- Label: Mercury
- Songwriters: Chris Allen; Branden Campbell; Elaine Bradley; Tyler Glenn; Tim Pagnotta
- Producer: Tim Pagnotta

Neon Trees singles chronology
| "Animal" (2010) | "1983" (2010) |

"Animal" is the debut single by American rock band Neon Trees, released on March 16, 2010 from their debut studio album, Habits.

== Chart performance ==
The song reached number 13 on the US Billboard Hot 100 and number 29 in Canada. It also reached number one on the Billboard Alternative Songs chart after 32 weeks, making "Animal" their first number-one song on a Billboard chart. This also broke the record for the longest-length of time for a song to get to the top of that list after entering. In September 2023, for the chart's 35th anniversary (by which time it had been renamed to Alternative Airplay), Billboard ranked the song at number 69 on its list of the 100 most successful songs in the chart's history. The song reached number two on the Billboard Rock Songs chart. On May 22, 2011, the song won Top Alternative Song at the 2011 Billboard Music Awards. It was certified double platinum by the Recording Industry Association of America in December 2011. "Animal" was the first song to be number one on the Alternative Songs chart and to be in the top 20 of the Billboard Hot 100 since Linkin Park's "New Divide" in June 2009.

== Music video ==
Two different music videos were made for the single, released in January and March 2010 respectively. In the first one, directed by Maxim Bohichik, the band breaks into an art gallery after putting all the gallery patrons into sleep with gas and they destroy the entire gallery. Then the guests have their faces painted into latex animal masks, and then they wake up to the band’s performance. This version was inspired and paid homage to Tim Burton's Batman when Joker and his goons vandalize a museum. In the second version, called "Viral Version", the direction is entrusted to BBGun, and sees the band playing the song in a prairie and inside a car.

== In popular culture ==
The song received increased coverage after it was played on Jimmy Kimmel Live!, The Tonight Show with Jay Leno, Adam Hills in Gordon Street Tonight, Lopez Tonight, Conan, and Live with Regis & Kelly by the band. It was also featured on the TV shows Melrose Place and Secrets of Aspen. The TV show Glee's Dalton Academy Warblers performed a duet version in the episode "Sexy". It was sung by characters Blaine Anderson, played by Darren Criss, and Kurt Hummel, played by Chris Colfer. It peaked at number 62 on the Billboard Hot 100.

The song has also been covered live by the Wanted, Train, Bridgit Mendler, Taylor Swift, Panic! at the Disco and Secondhand Serenade. The song was released as downloadable content for Rock Band in August 2010.

The song was also used in the Applebee's "All You Can Eat Boneless Wings More Wings, More Flavor" commercial.

The song appears in the soundtrack of the 2012 video game Forza Horizon, on the in-game radio station "Horizon Rocks".

== Charts ==
=== Weekly charts ===
| Chart (2010–2012) | Peak position |
|---|---|
| Australia (ARIA) | 25 |
| Austria (Ö3 Austria Top 40) | 40 |
| Belgium (Ultratop 50 Flanders) | 37 |
| Belgium (Ultratip Bubbling Under Wallonia) | 8 |
| Canada Hot 100 (Billboard) | 29 |
| Canada CHR/Top 40 (Billboard) | 17 |
| Canada Hot AC (Billboard) | 14 |
| Canada Rock (Billboard) | 21 |
| Denmark (Tracklisten) | 35 |
| Germany (GfK) | 38 |
| Hungary (Rádiós Top 40) | 12 |
| Netherlands (Dutch Top 40) | 9 |
| Netherlands (Single Top 100) | 46 |
| New Zealand (Recorded Music NZ) | 30 |
| Scottish Singles Sales (Official Charts) | 30 |
| Sweden (Sverigetopplistan) | 55 |
| Swiss Airplay (Schweizer Hitparade) | 35 |
| UK Singles (Official Charts) | 40 |
| US Billboard Hot 100 | 13 |
| US Adult Contemporary (Billboard) | 15 |
| US Adult Pop Airplay (Billboard) | 2 |
| US Dance Club Songs (Billboard) | 42 |
| US Hot Rock & Alternative Songs (Billboard) | 2 |
| US Pop Airplay (Billboard) | 7 |

=== Year-end charts ===
| Chart (2010) | Position |
|---|---|
| US Billboard Hot 100 | 61 |
| US Adult Top 40 (Billboard) | 22 |
| US Hot Rock Songs (Billboard) | 12 |

| Chart (2011) | Position |
|---|---|
| Netherlands (Dutch Top 40) | 15 |
| US Billboard Hot 100 | 97 |
| US Adult Contemporary (Billboard) | 33 |
| US Adult Top 40 (Billboard) | 24 |
| US Hot Rock Songs (Billboard) | 17 |

=== Decade-end charts ===
| Chart (2010–2019) | Position |
|---|---|
| US Hot Rock Songs (Billboard) | 40 |

== Certifications ==
| Region | Certification | Certified units/sales |
|---|---|---|
| Australia (ARIA) | Platinum | 70,000^{^} |
| New Zealand (RMNZ) | 2× Platinum | 60,000^{‡} |
| United Kingdom (BPI) | Gold | 400,000^{‡} |
| United States (RIAA) | 2× Platinum | 2,000,000^{*} |
^{*} Sales figures based on certification alone.^{^} Shipments figures based on certification alone.^{‡} Sales+streaming figures based on certification alone.

== Release history ==
| Country | Release date |
|---|---|
| United States | March 16, 2010 |
| United Kingdom | January 10, 2011 |
