= Lessons in Love (All Day, All Night) =

2012 single by Kaskade and Neon Trees

Single by Neon Trees featuring Kaskade

from the album Picture Show
- Released: September 4, 2012
- Recorded: 2011
- Genre: Pop rock
- Length: 3:43
- Label: Mercury
- Songwriters: Tyler Glenn; Branden Campbell; Elaine Bradley; Chris Allen; Ryan Raddon; Finn Bjarnson; John Hancock
- Producers: Justin Meldal-Johnsen; Kaskade; Chris Salzgeber; Randi Wilens

Neon Trees singles chronology
"Everybody Talks" (2011)	"Lessons in Love (All Day, All Night)" (2012)	"Weekend" (2013)

Kaskade singles chronology
"Lick It" (2012)	"Lessons in Love (All Day, All Night)" (2012)	"Llove" (2012)

Music video
- "Lessons In Love (All Day, All Night)" on YouTube

"Lessons in Love (All Day, All Night)" is a song by American rock band Neon Trees from the second studio album, Picture Show, featuring American DJ and record producer Kaskade. Written by Tyler Glenn, Branden Campbell, Elaine Bradley, Chris Allen, Ryan Raddon, Finn Bjarnson, and John Hancock, the song was produced by Justin Meldal-Johnsen, Kaskade, Chris Salzgeber, and Randi Wilens. "Lessons in Love (All Day, All Night)" was announced as the album's second single and released on September 4, 2012.

== Kaskade version ==
"Lessons in Love"

Song by Kaskade featuring Neon Trees

from the album Fire & Ice
- Released: August 2012
- Genre: House
- Length: 4:08 (Original Mix); 3:51 (Kaskade's ICE Mix)
- Label: Ultra
- Songwriters: Ryan Raddon; Finn Bjarnson; John Hancock; Tyler Glenn; Branden Campbell; Elaine Bradley; Chris Allen
- Producers: Kaskade; Finn Bjarnson; John Hancock; Neon Trees

Kaskade's version of the song, simply entitled "Lessons in Love", features Neon Trees and it was released on his seventh studio album, Fire & Ice. This version is a more house-inspired remake of "Lessons in Love (All Day, All Night)", and was released a year earlier. "Lessons in Love" debuted and reached number 94 on the Billboard Hot 100.

In the second disc of Fire & Ice, there is a secondary "ICE" version of the song, "Lessons in Love (Kaskade's ICE Mix)". This version does not feature Neon Trees and is the only "ICE" track in the album that removes vocals. Its compositional elements are similar to that of disco.

The Headhunterz remix became an official single in the U.S. via Ultra Music. It was released on iTunes on December 11, 2012 and on Beatport on December 26, 2012. Headhunterz has released a music video for the remix.

== Music video ==
The music video for "Lessons in Love (All Day, All Night)" was published to YouTube on October 16, 2012, through the Neon Trees Vevo channel. It has currently obtained over 1,000,000 views. The lyric video was released 8 days prior to the music video's release. The behind-the-scenes video explains how the music video is somewhat like a sequel to the main video for "Everybody Talks".

The video begins after where "Everybody Talks" ended, with Neon Trees frontman Tyler Glenn and a girl with pink sunglasses outside an unknown school. Tyler decides to get out of the van and enter the building. He runs into a strange man, likely a teacher, who yells at him before he runs away. Meanwhile, it appears that Tyler is the teacher for a class he is in, and he doesn't realize that the same girl with the pink sunglasses is inside the class. He teaches the class about self-esteem and respect. Near the end of the video, after a disco ball appears, everyone is turned into zombies (except for the girl with the sunglasses, who laughed). Tyler escapes the classroom and goes down to the main factory room where he was attacked, only to be waking up in the van where he started at with the girl. Throughout the video, the band is seen playing downstairs in the main room where Tyler was last seen being chased by the zombies. In the closing scene, immediately after Tyler wakes up and before the girl drives off with him, his eyes are glowing while the screen fades colors. This is likely a reference to Michael Jackson's Thriller due to the fact that this video was released near Halloween.

== Live performances ==
Before the end of 2012, Neon Trees has performed "Lessons in Love (All Day, All Night)" in Dick Clark's New Year's Rockin' Eve. It was performed in a medley with their previous hit songs, "Animal" and "Everybody Talks".

== Track listing ==
Remixes

1. "Lessons In Love (All Day, All Night)" (featuring Kaskade) – 3:43
2. "Lessons In Love (All Day, All Night)" (David Tort Remix) – 6:19
3. "Lessons In Love (All Day, All Night)" (Chevy One Remix) – 4:16
4. "Lessons In Love (All Day, All Night)" (Kemal Golden Remix) – 3:33
5. "Lessons In Love (All Day, All Night)" (Michel Remix) – 3:53

== Charts ==
=== Neon Trees version ===
Chart (2012–13)	Peak Position
US Hot Rock & Alternative Songs (Billboard)	30
US Rock & Alternative Airplay (Billboard)	41
US Adult Pop Airplay (Billboard)	19
US Alternative Airplay (Billboard)	31
US Pop Airplay (Billboard)	40

=== Kaskade version ===
Chart (2012)	Peak Position
US Billboard Hot 100	94
US Dance/Mix Show Airplay (Billboard)	20

==== Headhunterz Remix ====
Chart (2012–13)	Peak Position
Netherlands (Dutch Top 40)	22
Netherlands (Single Top 100)	27

===== Year-end charts =====
Chart (2013)	Position
Netherlands (Dutch Top 40)	128

== Release history ==
Release dates and formats for "Lessons in Love (All Day, All Night)"
Region	Date	Format	Label(s)	Ref.
United States	November 6, 2012	Mainstream airplay	Mercury	
