= Tyler Glenn =

American musician (born 1983)

- Born: Tyler Aaron Glenn; November 28, 1983 (age 42)
- Origin: Temecula, California, U.S.
- Genres: Pop rock; new wave; synth-pop; indie rock; alternative rock
- Occupations: Singer; songwriter; musician; record producer
- Instruments: Vocals; keyboards; guitar
- Labels: Mercury; Island
- Member of: Neon Trees

Tyler Aaron Glenn (born November 28, 1983) is an American singer, songwriter, musician, and record producer. He is known as the lead vocalist and keyboardist of the American rock band Neon Trees and as a solo artist.

== Biography ==
As a teenager, Glenn attended Chaparral High School in Temecula, California. He is a former member of the Church of Jesus Christ of Latter-day Saints (LDS Church). After high school, he served a Latter-day Saint mission in Nebraska.

Neon Trees' origins lay in Southern California in 2004 after Glenn's father suggested he play music with guitarist Chris Allen, the son of one of Glenn's father's friends. In 2005, they moved to Provo, Utah and formally founded Neon Trees, adding bassist Branden Campbell and drummer/backing vocalist Elaine Doty (who is now Elaine Bradley) in 2007. The band became well known in the music scene around Provo and Salt Lake City.

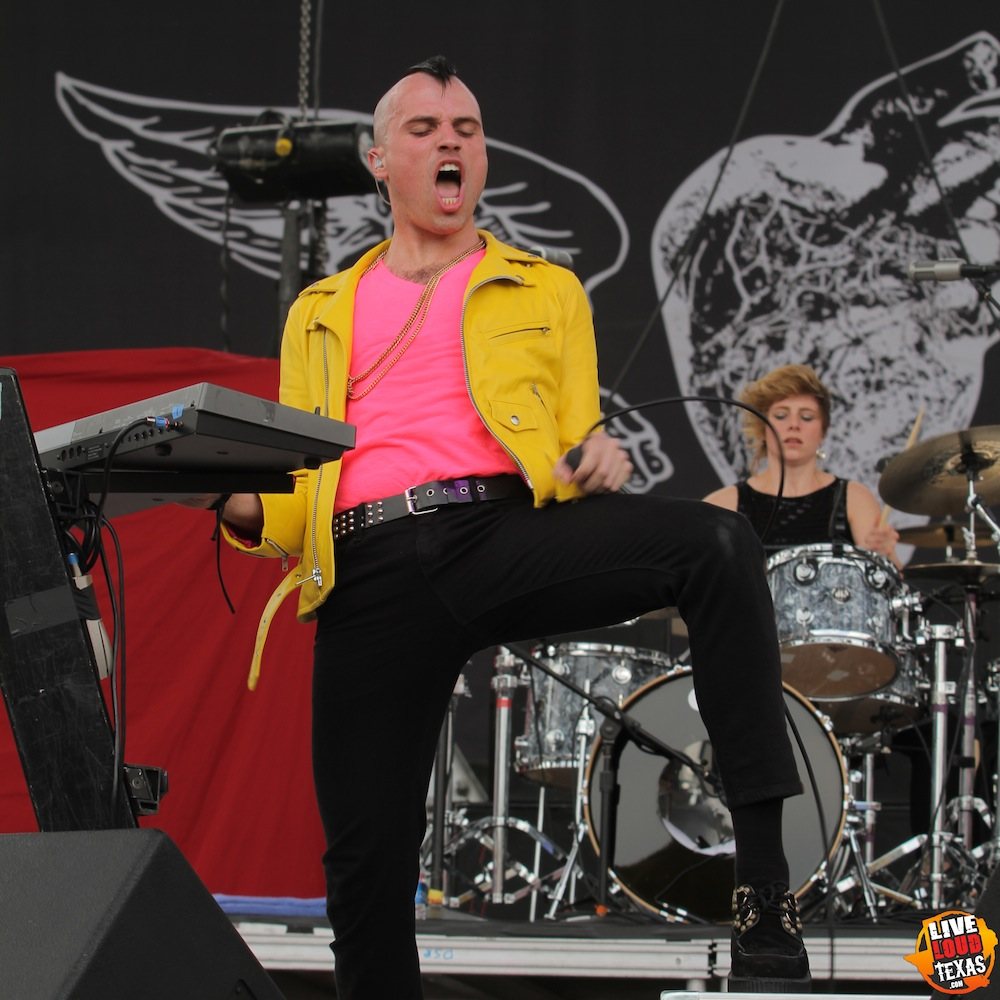
Tyler Glenn singing at Edgefest in Frisco, Texas, 2011.

In 2007, Ronnie Vannucci Jr. (drummer for The Killers), who knew Campbell from a previous band, saw Neon Trees playing at a small venue in Las Vegas and was impressed. As such, in 2008, The Killers invited the band to open for them during their North American tour.

Neon Trees released their first full-length album, Habits, in 2010. One song from that album, "Animal", which Glenn co-wrote, hit number one on the Billboard Alternative Songs chart. A second song co-written by Glenn, "Everybody Talks" from their 2011 album Picture Show, was also a top 10 hit in 2012.

In 2014, Glenn was featured as lead vocalist on "Born to Run," a song on Afrojack's debut studio album, Forget the World.

In 2015, Glenn joined the holiday music supergroup Band of Merrymakers for their album Welcome to Our Christmas Party.

On April 28, 2016, Glenn released his debut single as a solo artist, the electro pop single "Trash." The video for the song was premiered on Rolling Stone the next day. In the video, Glenn is seen drinking from a bottle of alcohol, spitting on an altered image of Joseph Smith, making the LDS church's temple tokens with his hands, and painting a red 'X' on his face. The video immediately generated controversy among Mormons, many of whom found it offensive.

Glenn released a solo album entitled "Excommunication" on October 21, 2016. Glenn said on the LGBTQ&A podcast that the lyrics, "I tried to kill myself and I'm not the only one" on the song, "G.D.M.M.L. GRLS", speaks to how anti-gay policies enacted by the LDS Church in 2015 affected himself and other queer people.

On April 11, 2018, Glenn announced on his Twitter that he would be making his Broadway debut playing Charlie Price, in Kinky Boots on May 6, 2018 which had a limited run through July 15, 2018.

== Personal life ==
In the April 10, 2014, issue of Rolling Stone, Glenn revealed he was gay and discussed keeping his sexuality a secret throughout his life. Glenn said he had known he was gay since he was a young child. "I had my crushes on guys throughout high school, but it was never an overwhelming thing until my twenties," he admits. "Then I'd be dating girls and in love with my straight friend and it was the worst feeling in the world," he said to Rolling Stone.

Regarding the Mormon faith he grew up with, Glenn stated in a 2012 interview: "The way I was raised and being a questioner, and getting a lot of my curiosities out early with drugs and alcohol, I think it's helped me maintain a more even keel where I'm not out of control." It had been widely reported that Glenn and the other members of Neon Trees do not drink alcohol or use illicit drugs. The LDS Church has had a longstanding policy against same-sex marriage. In November 2015, the LDS Church announced children of same-sex married couples could not be baptized until those children are 18 years of age. This policy has since been changed, allowing children of same sex couples to join the church. The 2015 announcement shocked Glenn. He no longer self-identifies as Mormon and later resigned his membership in the church. His 2016 solo album, Excommunication, is about his experience with the LDS Church and his frustration with their policies.

== Songwriting credits ==
Year	Artist	Song	Co-written with	U.S. Hot 100	U.S. Pop Songs	U.S. Rock Songs	Canadian Hot 100	Australian Singles	U.K. Singles
2009	Neon Trees	"Animal"	Tim Pagnotta, Chris Allen, Branden Campbell, Elaine Bradley	13	7	2	29	25	40
2010	Neon Trees	"1983"		–	–	28	–	76	–
2010	Neon Trees	"Your Surrender"	S*A*M and Sluggo	–	38	50	–	–	–
2011	Neon Trees	"Everybody Talks"	Tim Pagnotta	6	3	11	35	10	164
2012	Kaskade ft. Neon Trees	"Lessons in Love"	Ryan Raddon, John B. Hancock, Finn Bogi Bjarnson, Chris Allen, Branden Campbell, Elaine Bradley	–	40	26	–	–	–
2014	Neon Trees	"Sleeping with a Friend"	Tim Pagnotta	51	20	8	69	–	–
2014	Neon Trees	"I Love You (But I Hate Your Friends)"		–	–	–	–	–	–
2014	Neon Trees	"First Things First"		–	–	–	–	–	–
2014	Neon Trees	"Text Me in the Morning"		–	–	–	–	–	–
2015	Neon Trees	"Songs I Can't Listen To"		–	–	48	–	–	–
2016	Poppy	"American Kids"	Poppy, Titanic Sinclair, Sir Nolan, Tim Pagnotta	–	–	–	–	–	–

== Discography ==
=== Solo artist ===
- Excommunication (2016)

=== Singles ===
Title	Year	Album
"Somebody To Tell Me"	2020	Songs from "Love, Victor" (Original Soundtrack)

=== Featured artist ===
Title	Year	Other artist(s)	Album
"Born To Run"	2014	Afrojack	Forget The World
"Ender"	2014	Cory Layton	Ender
