= Elaine Bradley =

American drummer

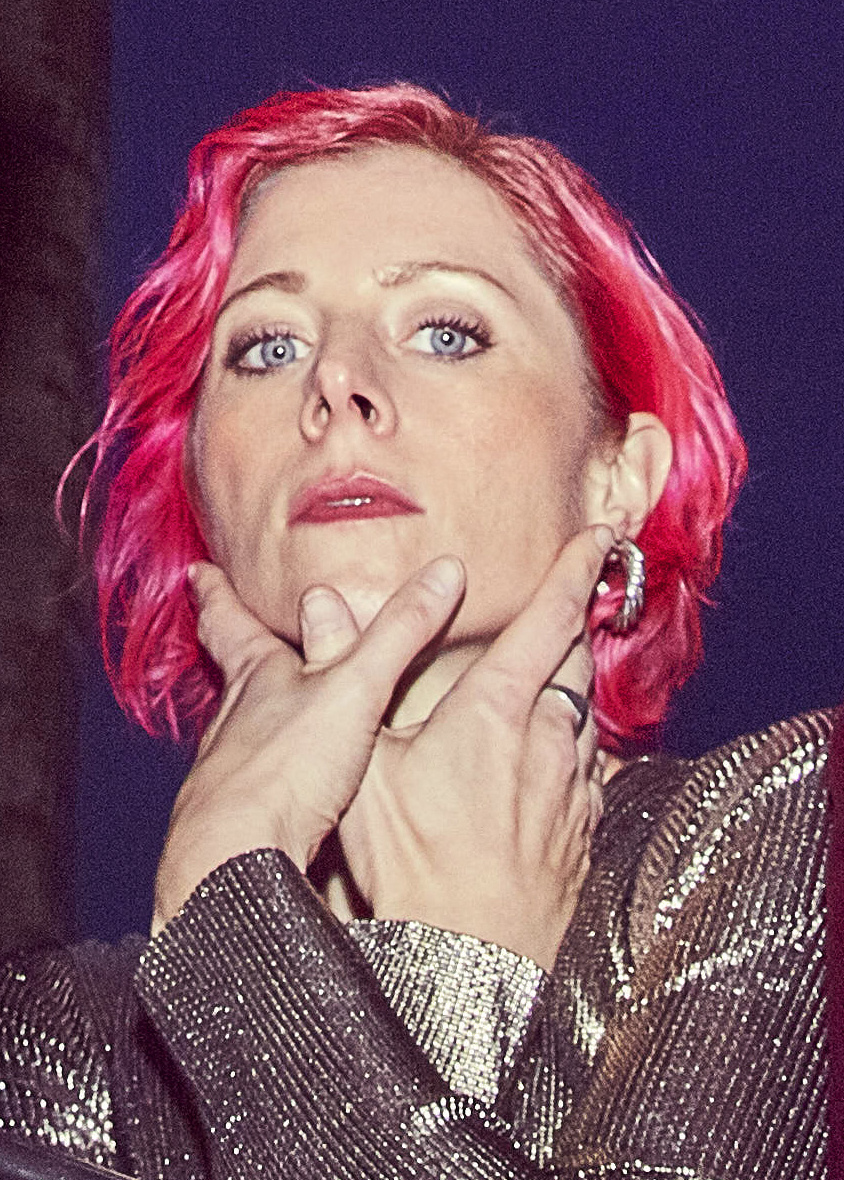
- Bradley in 2020

Background information
- Genres: Pop rock; new wave; synth-pop; indie rock; alternative rock
- Occupations: Musician; songwriter
- Instruments: Drums; percussion; vocals; guitar
- Years active: 1994–present
- Labels: Island; Mercury

Elaine Bradley is an American musician and songwriter. She is the drummer for the American rock band Neon Trees since 2007 and the host of BYUtv's unscripted series Grace Notes since 2020.

== Early life ==
Elaine Bradley was the youngest of seven children. She is a member of The Church of Jesus Christ of Latter-day Saints and volunteered full-time as a missionary in Frankfurt, Germany for eighteen months. She later earned a B.S. in Public Health and a minor in German from Brigham Young University at the top of her class.

== Career ==
She began her musical career with the Chicago emo band Nymb which was formed in 1994. She was one of the founding members and her role was that of vocalist and drummer during the first three years of the band but later, in 1997, she switched to the role of rhythm guitarist after the departure of their original rhythm guitarist. She remained as vocalist and guitarist until the band broke up on August 3rd, 2001. At the time, before the break up, she began working on a solo project called Big Thick Skin which lasted until 2002. In 2004, Elaine formed the band Noble Bodies (was Another Statistic) with Bryce Taylor, who she met on her missionary in Germany. They started making music, and stopped around the time Elaine joined Neon Trees. They reunited officially in 2017, and have released two EPs since. Neon Trees formed in 2005 and Elaine Bradley joined in 2007. Neon Trees gained nationwide exposure in 2008 when their premier single "Animal" topped the Billboard Alternative Songs chart and reached #13 on the Billboard Hot 100, later winning a Billboard Music Award for Top Alternative Song (2011). They have since released four albums, earned two RIAA double-platinum singles, and toured extensively with other groups including Thirty Seconds to Mars, Angels & Airwaves, My Chemical Romance, Duran Duran, The Offspring, and Maroon 5. In 2015, she, Bryce Taylor, and Eric Robertson (high school friend of Bryce Taylor) formed a band called [[Kissed Out]]. Kissed Out released their debut EP "Sex Matters" in 2022 which features their most popular song, "Minus Yours". In 2016, Elaine, Robbie Connolly (Fictionist), Scott Shepard (Book on Tape Worm), and Eric Robertson (New Shack, Kissed Out) got together to create three songs over the course of three days in Provo, Utah and were featured on Provo Music Magazine.

Bradley has filled in as a drummer for The 8G Band for two weeks on Late Night with Seth Meyers in 2016 and 2017.

== Equipment ==
Bradley plays Gretsch USA Custom drums in Neon Trees and Gretsch Renown in Noble Bodies. She uses a Gretsch chrome over brass Brooklyn snare and Zildjian cymbals. Her drum heads are Evans. She uses Vic Firth 5A drumsticks. She plays two floor toms in Neon Trees and one in Noble Bodies.

== Personal life ==
Elaine married Sebastian Bradley, a dual German/American citizen, in January 2010 in the Draper Utah Temple. They have four children, two of which are adopted. She and her family are featured in a video campaign for The Church of Jesus Christ of Latter-day Saints. On October 11, 2025, she posted an announcement on Instagram stating that she had come out as Lesbian and is married to Becky Swasey.

== Filmography ==
=== Television ===
Year	Title	Role	Notes
2012	Audio-Files	Neon Trees	Episode 10
2012	Late Show with David Letterman	Neon Trees	Season 20, Episode 1
2016-2017	Late Night with Seth Meyers	Guest Musician with The 8G Band	Season 4, Episodes 9-12; Season 5, Episodes 4-7
2020-present	Grace Notes	Host / Associate Producer	Seasons 1-4, All Episodes
