= Neon Trees =

American rock band

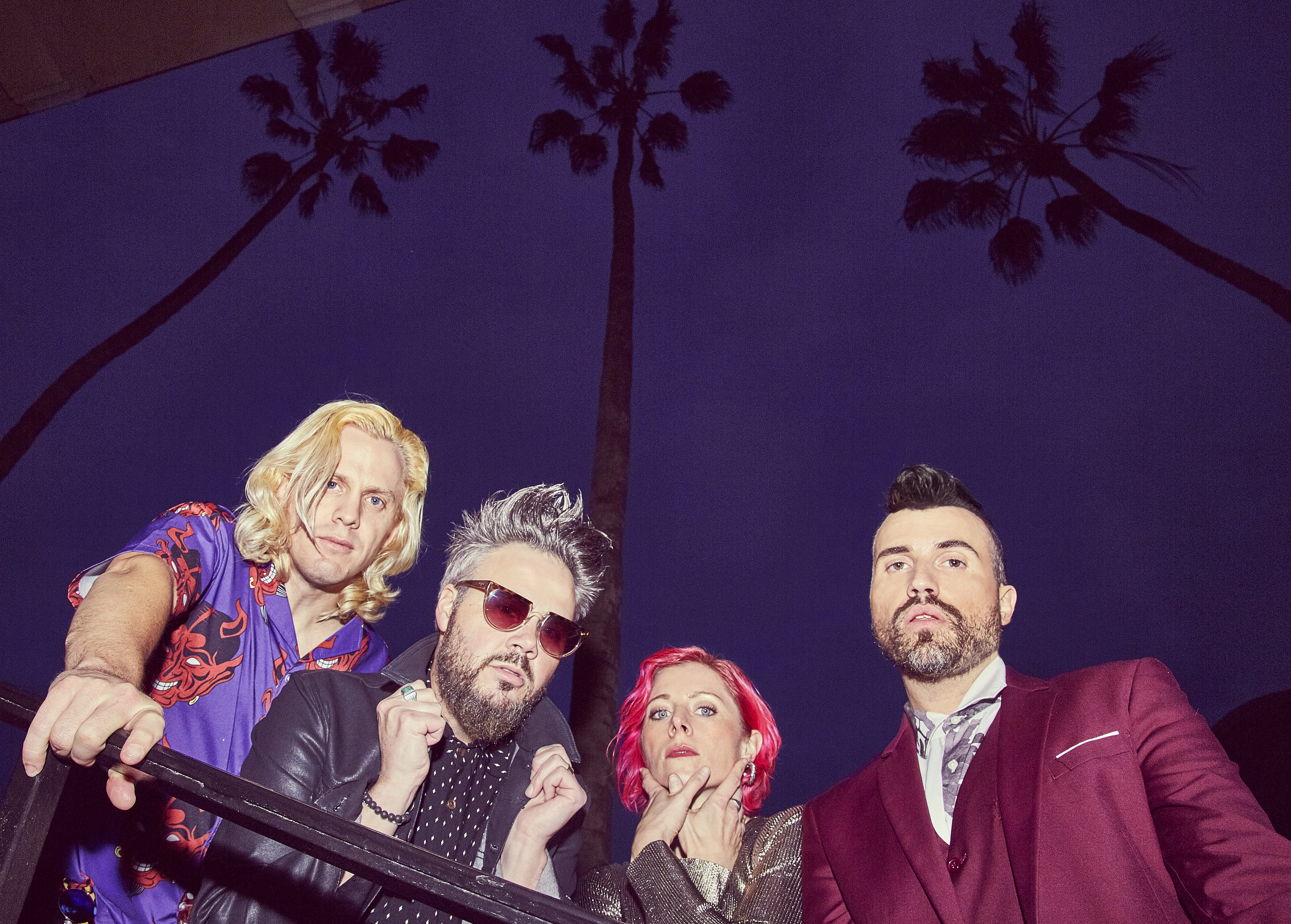
- Neon Trees in 2020. From left to right: Chris Allen, Branden Campbell, Elaine Bradley, and Tyler Glenn

Background information
- Origin: Provo, Utah, U.S.
- Genres: Pop rock; new wave; synth-pop; indie rock; alternative rock
- Years active: 2005–present
- Labels: Mercury; Island; Thrill Forever; Downtown; Geffen; Round Hill
- Members: Chris Allen; Tyler Glenn; Elaine Bradley; Branden Campbell
- Past members: Mike Liechty; Jason Gibbons; Nathan Evans
- Website: neontrees.com

Neon Trees are an American rock band founded in Provo, Utah. The band received nationwide exposure in late 2008 when they opened several North American tour dates for the band the Killers. Not long after, the band was signed by Mercury Records. Their first single, "Animal", climbed to No. 13 on the Billboard Hot 100 and No. 1 on the Alternative Songs chart.

Since their formation, Neon Trees has released five studio albums: Habits (2010), Picture Show (2012), Pop Psychology (2014), I Can Feel You Forgetting Me (2020), and Sink Your Teeth (2024). The band has also released eight EPs (two exclusive to iTunes) and fourteen singles.

== History ==
=== Early years (2005–2010) ===
Formed initially by childhood friends Tyler Glenn (vocals, keyboards) and Chris Allen (guitar, vocals) who both grew up in Murrieta, California, the band made its first home in Provo after Glenn and Allen moved there from Southern California, eventually adding Branden Campbell (bass guitar, vocals) and Elaine Bradley (drums, percussion, vocals) to the lineup. David Charles plays with the band as touring guitarist.

They first started playing under the name Neon Trees in late 2005 with five original members, Tyler Glenn and Chris Allen from California, and three veterans of the Utah music scene, bass player Mike Liechty, drummer Jason Gibbons and keyboardist Nathan Evans. The band's name originates from the lighted trees on the In-N-Out Burger signs, which inspired Tyler Glenn. In a strange coincidence, it was later learned that Branden Campbell's father, Steve Campbell, installed the exact Neon Trees in the In-N-Out that inspired Glenn while working for a sign company out of Las Vegas.

They released an EP, Becoming Different People, in 2006 during the time of their first tour through California. The EP featured promising songs like "Phones", "Sister Stereo", "Up Against the Glass". They also recorded other unreleased tracks during the "Treehouse Sessions" in 2006.

The band's lineup soon narrowed down to four members with Branden Campbell and Elaine Bradley joining the group on bass and drums, respectively. Touring musician Bruce Rubenson on keyboards and drums joined in. Shortly thereafter, The Killers' drummer, Ronnie Vannucci Jr., went to watch the band play at a small club in Las Vegas as he had been in a Ska band called "Attaboy Skip" with Neon Trees bassist Branden Campbell prior to joining The Killers. Ronnie was impressed, and as a result they were chosen to open for The Killers for a string of dates on their 2008 North American tour. Vannucci later helped the band sign to major label Mercury Records, which was announced in late 2008. Additionally, the group was voted Band of the Year in 2009 by City Weekly, a popular Salt Lake City publication.

=== 2010–11: Habits and commercial breakthrough ===
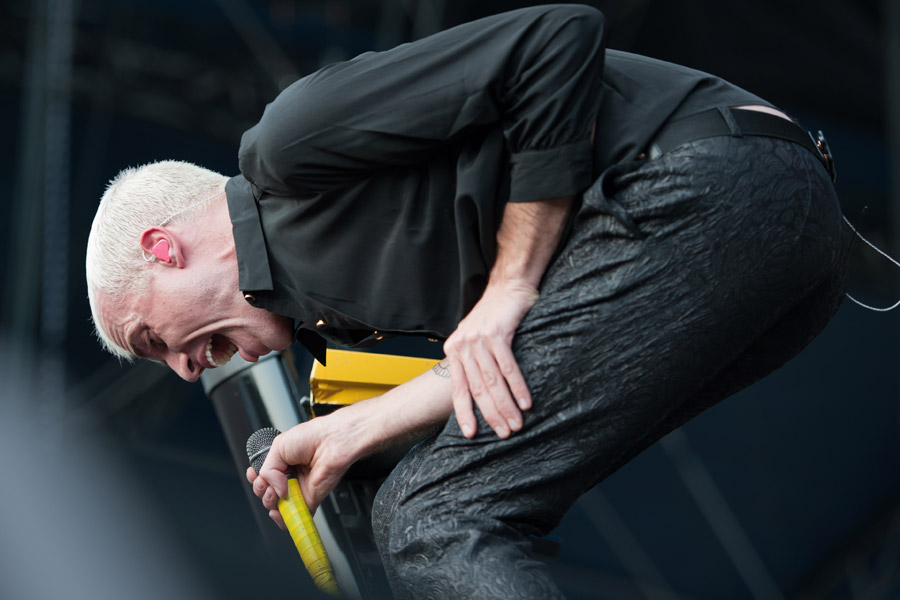
Neon Trees at Music Midtown 2012

Although they had several prior independent releases, the band released its debut album on Mercury/Island Def Jam, Habits, on March 16, 2010. "Animal" was chosen as the lead single and was shortly thereafter featured as the Free Single of the Week on iTunes in March 2010. They performed the song on Jimmy Kimmel Live! on March 23, 2010, The Tonight Show with Jay Leno on May 14, 2010, Lopez Tonight on October 18, 2010, Live! with Regis & Kelly on November 4, 2010, and TBS' Conan on November 24, 2010. They performed a second single 1983 on Late Night with Jimmy Fallon on January 13, 2011 and another stint on The Tonight Show with Jay Leno on Jan 18, 2011. They performed third single "Your Surrender" on Late Show with David Letterman on May 5, 2011 and a third appearance on The Tonight Show with Jay Leno on Jun 10, 2011. Mark Hoppus of Blink-182 selected "Animal" as his Spin magazine Pick of the Week. The song has also been featured on a commercial for Las Vegas. The group has also released a digital EP of four remixes of the song, one of which by Tyler Glenn.

In 2010, the band covered Justin Bieber's song "Baby" as well as Ben E. King's "Stand By Me". Throughout early 2010 the band, along with Mutemath and Street Drum Corps, opened for the Thirty Seconds to Mars tour Into the Wild. Subsequently, they headlined the Bang the Gong Tour with Paper Tongues, MeTalkPretty, and Civil Twilight in mid-2010, performed a set to 7,000 at Lollapalooza, and went on tour with Thirty Seconds to Mars in the last half of the year.

=== 2011–13: Picture Show ===
On December 7, 2011, an article published by Rolling Stone's website streamed the band's new song "Everybody Talks". On February 10, 2012, a video was posted on their official YouTube page, titled Neon Trees – Picture Show Teaser One / The New Album April 17, advertising their new album is to be released on April 17, 2012. In March 2012, Neon Trees and their single "Everybody Talks" were featured in a commercial for the 2012 Buick Verano. The single was covered in episode five of season four of Glee.

Neon Trees' second studio album Picture Show was released on April 17, 2012. On August 29, 2012, Neon Trees performed "Everybody Talks" on the America's Got Talent live results show. In early fall 2012, the band toured with The Offspring and Dead Sara. In 2013 they joined Maroon 5 in their world tour alongside Owl City. In November/December 2013 they were a support act for Taylor Swift's three concerts in New Zealand and four concerts in Australia. The band was featured on NBC's coverage of the 2012 Macy's Thanksgiving Day Parade. They performed an abbreviated version of their single "Everybody Talks". The second single from the album is the track "Lessons in Love (All Day, All Night)" with the collaboration of American record producer and D.J. Kaskade.

=== 2014–2017: Pop Psychology ===
Neon Trees' third studio album, Pop Psychology, was released on April 22, 2014. The first single from Pop Psychology, titled "Sleeping with a Friend", was released for digital download. The band performed the single on The Tonight Show with Jay Leno on January 22, 2014.

"Sleeping with a Friend" was solicited to U.S. Contemporary hit radio by both Mercury and Island Records on February 25, 2014. Neon Trees later released four more singles following "Sleeping with a Friend". The singles are titled "I Love You (But I Hate Your Friends)", "Voices In the Halls", and "First Things First". "First Things First" is the end credit song for the 2016 Netflix Original series Dirk Gently's Holistic Detective Agency.

In 2015, the group announced the "An Intimate Night With Neon Trees" Tour. The tour ran from June 6, 2015, to July 26, 2015, finishing in Boston, Massachusetts, at the House Of Blues Boston. Opening acts included Alex Winston, Yes You Are, Coin, and Fictionist.

On May 5, 2015, the band released a non-album single entitled "Songs I Can't Listen To" and an accompanying music video on June 3, 2015, featuring Dustin Lance Black.

On August 4, 2017, the band premiered a new single "Feel Good".

=== 2019–2023: I Can Feel You Forgetting Me ===
Neon Trees released "Used to Like", the lead single from their fourth album, on November 13, 2019. The second single, "New Best Friend" was released on May 20, 2020. On July 10, 2020, the band released the third single called "Mess Me Up". The fourth and final single, "Nights", was released on July 22, 2020. The album, I Can Feel You Forgetting Me, was released on July 24, 2020. In December 2021, they released a new single and video, "Holiday Rock".

=== 2023–present: Sink Your Teeth ===
Sink Your Teeth, the fifth studio album by Neon Trees, was released on September 20, 2024. There are 12 songs on the album. On June 30, 2023, the first and lead single of the album "Favorite Daze" was released. The second single, "Losing My Head", was released on September 15, 2023. Three more singles were released in early 2024 before the album; "Bad Dreams" (May 31), "El Diablo" (July 19), and "Cruel Intentions" (August 28)

== Musical style ==
Neon Trees' musical style has been described as pop rock, new wave, synth-pop, indie rock, alternative rock, pop, and electropop. When describing the band's sound, Heather Phares of AllMusic wrote "Neon Trees blend new wave, dance, and indie into smart, catchy pop." Sputnikmusic described the band's debut studio album Habits as a "refreshing blast of timeless rock energy and spirit that wouldn't sound out of place at any point from '60s garage-rock to 2010 dance rock."

== Band members ==
Current members

- Chris Allen – lead and rhythm guitar, backing vocals (2005–present)
- Tyler Glenn – lead vocals (2005–present); keyboards, piano, synthesizer, occasional rhythm guitar (2006–present)
- Elaine Bradley – drums, percussion, backing vocals, occasional lead vocals and rhythm guitar (2007–present)
- Branden Campbell – bass guitar, backing vocals (2007–present)

Former members

- Mike Liechty – bass guitar (2005–2006)
- Jason Gibbons – drums, percussion (2005–2006)
- Nathan Evans – keyboards, piano, synthesizer (2005–2006)
- Bruce Rubenson – drums, percussion, keyboards, piano, synthesizer (2006–present)

Touring musicians

- David Charles – rhythm guitar, backing vocals (2005–present)
- Denney Fuller – bass guitar, backing vocals (2025–present)

== Discography ==
- Habits (2010)
- Picture Show (2012)
- Pop Psychology (2014)
- I Can Feel You Forgetting Me (2020)
- Sink Your Teeth (2024)

== Awards and nominations ==
APRA Music Awards

Year	Nominee / work	Award	Result
2012	"Animal"	International Work of the Year	Nominated

BMI Pop Awards

Year	Nominee / work	Award	Result
2012	"Animal"	Award-Winning Songs	Won
2015	"Sleeping with a Friend"	Award-Winning Songs	Won

Billboard Music Awards

Year	Nominee / work	Award	Result
2011	"Animal"	Top Alternative Song	Won
2011	"Animal"	Top Rock Song	Nominated
2012	Neon Trees	Top Adult Pop Songs Artist	Nominated
2012	"Everybody Talks"	Top Adult Pop Song	Nominated

International Dance Music Awards

Year	Nominee / work	Award	Result
2011	"Animal"	Best Alternative/Rock Dance Track	Nominated
2013	"Lessons in Love (All Day, All Night) (ft. Kaskade)	Best Alternative/Rock Dance Track	Nominated
2015	"Sleeping with a Friend"	Best Alternative/Rock Dance Track	Nominated

MTV Europe Music Awards

Year	Nominee / work	Award	Result
2011	Neon Trees	Best Push Act	Nominated

World Music Awards

Year	Nominee / work	Award	Result
2012	Themselves	World's Best Group	Nominated
