= Victorious 22 =

American fashion company

Victorious 22 (V22LA) is a Los Angeles based fashion line in denim, leather jackets, pants, purses, and accessories. It was started in 2010 by Frank Rodriguez and his wife Angela.

== History and overview ==
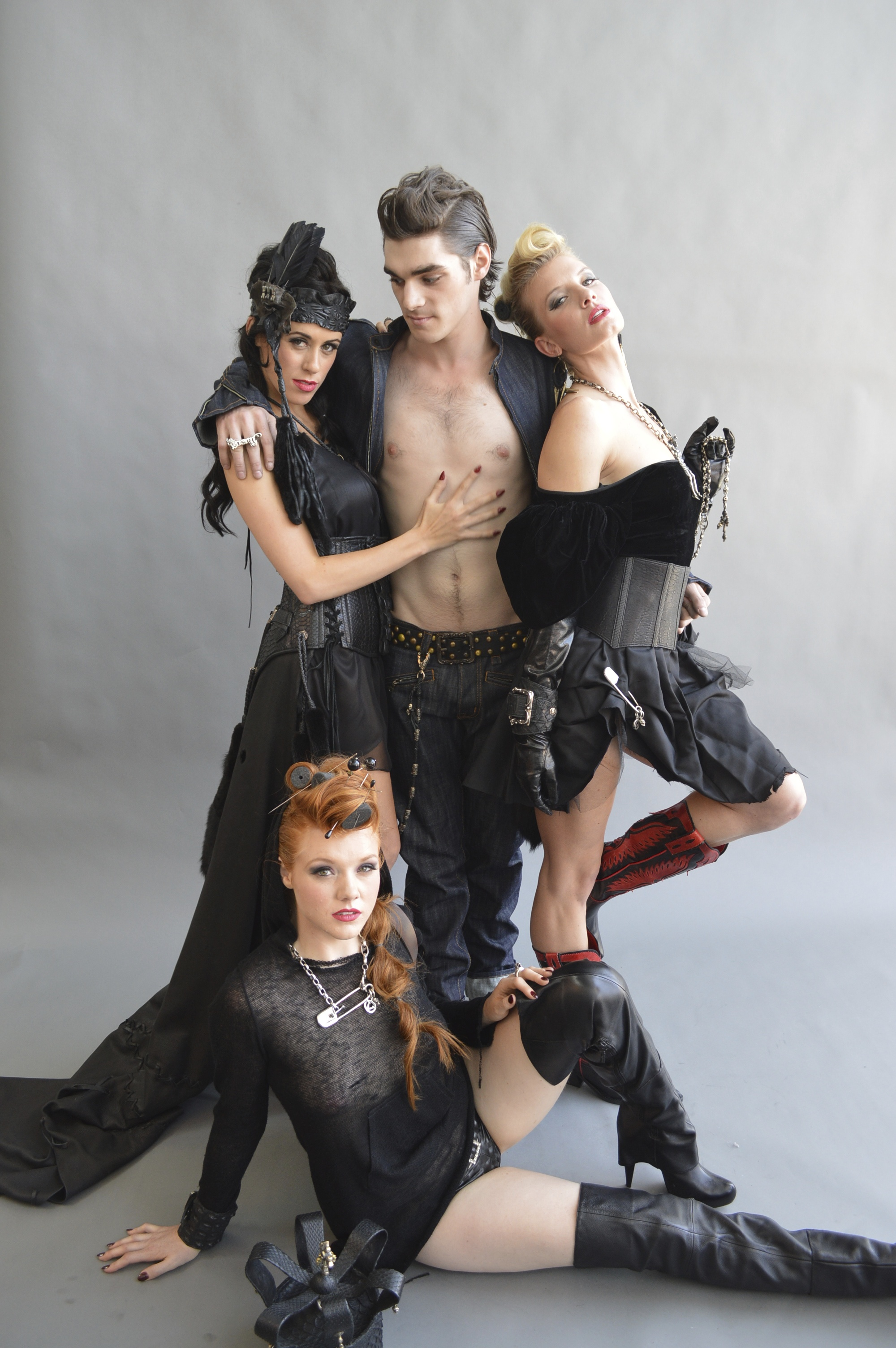
Rj Mitte modeling V22 clothing line

Frank Rodriguez got his start as a designer in the 1980s, designing leather jackets and selling them to stores on Melrose Avenue in Los Angeles. It was around this time that Angela Smith was making hand-sewn bags and bone jewelry, which she also sold in stores on Melrose Avenue and other boutique shops throughout Los Angeles.

Being a lifelong rider and builder of bikes and cars, Rodriguez gained notoriety for his luxe custom bikes as owner and operator of Excalibur Choppers.

After leaving the world of custom bike building, Rodriguez and Smith started V22LA out of a small Hollywood apartment with a collection for men, using high quality denim, selvedge denim, and hand-picked leather. The line expanded into jewelry, objets d’art, and handmade items for the home. The couture women's line came along in 2012, which included bags, motorcycle jackets and jewelry in the vein of punk rock, bohemian and rock 'n roll style.

=== Expansion ===
V22LA began in a small North Hollywood apartment and later expanded to a 7000- square feet showroom and compound. The company plans to bring all manufacturing to the other floors of the building which it now occupies in the fashion district of Downtown Los Angeles, so that all production will be in-house. The company decided to keep operations within the US, and turned down offers to manufacture elsewhere. It ambitions to export high end apparel to overseas markets.

A storefront in Tokyo, Japan was opened in 2011. The company plans to expand its business to China marketplace by the end of 2015.

== Reception ==
The clothing line has been featured in numerous publications and art magazines, of those include:

- Dark Beauty,
- Rolling Stone,
- Astonish,
- Inked (magazine),
- This is Rock Spain,
- Easyriders,
- Biker,
- Etro Japan,
- Relapse,
- Sorbet (disambiguation),
- Corona Beer advertisement.

Also the apparel line has gained the attention of rock stars and musicians, including: Steve Vai, Dylan McDermott, Sylvester Stallone, Orlando Bloom, Steve Lukather of Toto, Robert Trujillo of Metallica, Usher, Chris Brown, Future, Nicole Murphy, Columbus Short, and RJ Mitte.

V22LA signed a deal to create apparel for the TV series Sons of Anarchy

V22LA works with the Claire's Place Foundation, a Cystic fibrosis organization, and hosted the 2014 Boot Campaign Boot Bash.
