= Sharbat =

Sharbat may refer to:

- Sharbat (drink), a Middle Eastern variety of cordial
- Sharbat Ali Changezi, Pakistani fighter pilot
- Sharbat Gula, the subject of the Afghan Girl cover photograph on the front cover of National Geographic magazine's June 1985 issue
- Sharbat Khan, a detainee at Guantanamo Bay

== See also ==
- Sherbet (disambiguation)
- Sherbert (disambiguation)
- Sorbet (disambiguation)
