= Sherbet =

Sherbet may refer to:

== Food and drink ==
- Sherbet (frozen dessert), a North American creamy sorbet
- Sherbet (powder), an effervescent drink or a fizzy powder sweet, outside North America
- Sharbat (drink), a sweet Middle Eastern infusion or cordial
- A slang term in the UK and Australia for an alcoholic drink, especially beer; see Sherbet (powder) § Slang

== Music ==
- Sherbet (band), an Australian rock band of the 1970s and early 1980s
  - Sherbet (Sherbet album), a 1978 album by Sherbet
- Sherbet (EP), a 2012 by the Japanese girl group Buono!

== See also ==
- Sharbat (disambiguation)
- Sherbert (disambiguation)
- Sorbet (disambiguation)
