= Sherbert =

Sherbert may refer to

- Sherbert v. Verner, a United States Supreme Court case involving the Free Exercise Clause of the First Amendment to the Constitution
- Sherbert (Pillow Pal), a Pillow Pal bear made by Ty, Inc
- Sherbet (powder)
- Sherbet (frozen dessert)

== See also ==
- Sharbat (disambiguation)
- Sherbet (disambiguation)
