= Sorbet (disambiguation) =

Sorbet is a frozen dessert of Iranian origin

Sorbet may also refer to:

- Sorbet (Hannibal), an episode of the TV series Hannibal
- Sorbets, Gers, commune in Occitania, France
- Sorbets, Landes, commune Nouvelle-Aquitaine, France
- Sorbet (South Africa), a South African beauty salon chain

== See also ==
- Sorbetes, an ice cream from the Philippines
- Sherbet (disambiguation)
- Sharbat (disambiguation)
