= MTV Woodies =

- Awarded for: Best emerging music of previous year
- Country: United States
- First award: November 5, 2004
- Final award: March 16, 2017
- Website: http://www.mtv.com/woodies

Television/radio coverage
- Network: MTV

The MTV Woodies (formerly known as the MTVU Woodie Awards) was an annual music show presented by MTVU with awards voted on by fans.

== Ceremonies ==
| # | Date aired | Host(s) |
|---|---|---|
| 1st | Friday, November 5, 2004 | Gardner Loulan & Maria Sansone |
| 2nd | Wednesday, November 2, 2005 | |
| 3rd | Wednesday, October 25, 2006 | |
| 4th | Thursday, November 8, 2007 | |
| 5th | Wednesday, November 12, 2008 | |
| 6th | Wednesday, November 18, 2009 | |
| 7th | Wednesday, March 16, 2011 | Donald Glover |
| 8th | Sunday, March 18, 2012 | |
| 9th | Sunday, March 17, 2013 | Tegan and Sara & Machine Gun Kelly |
| 10th | Thursday, March 13, 2014 | |
| 11th | Friday, March 20, 2015 | Jack Antonoff |
| 12th | Wednesday, March 16, 2016 | ASAP Rocky |
| 13th | Thursday, March 16, 2017 | Rick Ross |

== Category ==
=== Woodie of the Year ===
- 2004: Modest Mouse - "Float On"
  - Anthony Hamilton - "Comin' from Where I'm From"
  - Death Cab for Cutie - "The New Year"
  - Jet - "Are You Gonna Be My Girl"
  - Yeah Yeah Yeahs - "Maps"
- 2005: My Chemical Romance
  - Arcade Fire
  - Common
  - Fall Out Boy
  - Gorillaz
- 2006: Angels & Airwaves
  - Atmosphere
  - Gym Class Heroes
  - Panic! at the Disco
  - The Academy Is...
- 2007: Gym Class Heroes
  - Amy Winehouse
  - Common
  - Lily Allen
  - The Shins
- 2008: Paramore
  - Lil Wayne
  - MGMT
  - Santigold
  - Tokyo Police Club
- 2009: Kings of Leon
  - Asher Roth
  - Drake
  - MGMT
  - Silversun Pickups
- 2011: Wiz Khalifa - "Black and Yellow"
  - Arcade Fire - "The Suburbs"
  - The Black Keys - "Tighten Up"
  - B.o.B & Hayley Williams - "Airplanes"
  - LCD Soundsystem - "Drunk Girls"
- 2012: Mac Miller
  - The Black Keys
  - Foster the People
  - Frank Ocean
  - J. Cole
  - Skrillex
- 2013: Machine Gun Kelly
  - ASAP Rocky
  - Edward Sharpe and the Magnetic Zeros
  - Fun
  - Grimes
  - Kendrick Lamar
  - Walk the Moon
- 2014: Drake
  - Disclosure
  - Imagine Dragons
  - Lorde
  - Pharrell Williams
  - Zedd
- 2015: Porter Robinson
  - Charli XCX
  - FKA Twigs
  - J. Cole
  - Run the Jewels
  - Sam Smith
- 2017: The Chainsmokers
  - Big Sean
  - Chance the Rapper
  - Childish Gambino
  - Solange Knowles
  - Twenty One Pilots

=== Breaking Woodie ===
- 2004: The Killers - "Somebody Told Me"
  - Atmosphere - "Trying to Find a Balance"
  - Butterfly Boucher "I Can't Make Me"
  - Robert Randolph and the Family Band - "I Need More Love"
  - Secret Machines - "Nowhere Again"
- 2005: Motion City Soundtrack
  - Matisyahu
  - Paul Wall
  - The Bravery
  - The Decemberists
- 2006: Plain White T's
  - Arctic Monkeys
  - Chamillionaire
  - Imogen Heap
  - Lupe Fiasco
- 2007: Boys Like Girls
  - Peter Bjorn and John
  - Rich Boy
  - Silversun Pickups
  - Tokyo Police Club
- 2008: Afterhour
  - All Time Low
  - Lykke Li
  - Tyga
  - We the Kings
- 2009: Never Shout Never
  - Grizzly Bear
  - Wale
  - La Roux
  - Friendly Fires
  - Passion Pit
- 2011: Two Door Cinema Club
  - Dev
  - Local Natives
  - Sleigh Bells
  - Wavves
- 2012: Machine Gun Kelly
  - ASAP Rocky
  - Azealia Banks
  - Charli XCX
  - Childish Gambino
  - Cloud Nothings
  - Cults
  - Electric Guest
  - Fake Problems
  - Fun
  - Future
  - Iggy Azalea
  - Kendrick Lamar
  - Meek Mill
  - Lana Del Rey
  - Porter Robinson
  - Sleeper Agent
  - Travis Mills
  - Tune-Yards
  - Walk the Moon
  - Wallpaper
  - The Weeknd
- 2013: Earl Sweatshirt
  - alt-J
  - Dillon Francis
  - Gold Fields
  - The Lumineers
  - Twenty One Pilots
  - Zedd
- 2014: The 1975
  - Arctic Monkeys
  - Jhené Aiko
  - Martin Garrix
  - Tristan Wilds
  - Sam Smith

=== Left Field Woodie ===
- 2004: N.E.R.D - "Maybe"
  - The Dresden Dolls - "Girl Anachronism"
  - Kenna - "Freetime"
  - Kinky - "Presidente"
  - The Streets - "Fit but You Know It"
- 2005: MewithoutYou
  - Arcade Fire
  - Matisyahu
  - M.I.A.
  - Saul Williams
- 2006: Gnarls Barkley
  - Gogol Bordello
  - Imogen Heap
  - Lady Sovereign
  - Wolfmother
- 2007: Madvillain
  - CSS
  - Klaxons
  - Rodrigo y Gabriela
  - The Knife
- 2008: Chromeo
  - The Cool Kids
  - No Age
  - She & Him
  - Yelle
- 2009: Tech N9ne
  - Amanda Black
  - Janelle Monáe
  - Major Lazer
  - Jay Reatard
- 2011: Kanye West
  - Das Racist
  - Die Antwoord
  - Lil B
  - Yelawolf

=== Good Woodie ===
- 2004: Sum 41
  - Beastie Boys
  - Coldplay
  - Death Cab for Cutie
  - Sean Combs
- 2005: U2
  - Coldplay
  - Common
  - David Banner
  - Kanye West
- 2006: Serj Tankian
  - Juvenile
  - Ludacris
  - Pearl Jam
  - Rise Against
- 2007: Guster
  - Alicia Keys
  - Linkin Park
  - The Red Jumpsuit Apparatus
  - Thom Yorke
- 2008: Jack's Mannequin
  - Eddie Vedder
  - Emmanuel Jal
  - Mary J. Blige
  - Ludacris
- 2009: Jamie Tworkowski
  - John Legend
  - Wyclef Jean
  - Kenna
  - Alicia Keys

=== Soundtrack of My Life Woodie ===
- 2004: Coheed and Cambria - In Keeping Secrets of Silent Earth: 3
  - Akon - Trouble
  - Franz Ferdinand - Franz Ferdinand
  - Jadakiss - Kiss tha Game Goodbye
  - The Postal Service - Give Up

=== The Sophmore [sic] Jump Woodie ===
- 2004: Taking Back Sunday - "A Decade Under the Influence"
  - Black Rebel Motorcycle Club - "Stop"
  - Nappy Roots - "Sick and Tired"
  - Something Corporate - "Space"
  - Sugarcult - "Memory"

=== The Silent but Deadly Woodie ===
- 2004: Modest Mouse - "Float On"
  - Kenna - "Freetime"
  - Mogwai - "Hunted by a Freak"
  - Reggie and the Full Effect - "Congratulations Smack and Katy"
  - Steriogram - "Walkie Talkie Man"

=== Road Woodie ===
- 2004: Coheed and Cambria
  - Jack Johnson
  - O.A.R.
  - Phish
  - The Roots
- 2006: Taking Back Sunday
  - Cartel
  - The Fray
  - Hellogoodbye
  - Nightmare of You

=== Streaming Woodie ===
- 2004: Fall Out Boy - "Grand Theft Autumn/Where Is Your Boy"
  - Coheed and Cambria - "A Favor House Atlantic"
  - Copeland - "Walking Downtown"
  - Madvillain - "All Caps"
  - O.A.R. - "Hey Girl"
- 2005: The Afters - "Beautiful Love"
  - Aberfeldy - "Love is an Arrow"
  - Alicia Keys - "Karma"
  - Death Cab for Cutie - "Title and Registration"
  - Eisley - "Telescope Eyes"
  - Gorillaz & De La Soul - "Feel Good Inc."
  - Hawthorne Heights - "Ohio Is for Lovers"
  - K'naan - "Soobax"
  - Matisyahu - "King Without a Crown"
  - Mike Jones, Paul Wall & Slim Thug - "Still Tippin'"
  - Modest Mouse - "Ocean Breathes Salty"
  - My Chemical Romance - "I'm Not Okay (I Promise)"
  - Straylight Run - "Existentialism on Prom Night"
  - Taking Back Sunday - "A Decade Under the Influence"
  - The Alchemist, Prodigy, Nina Sky & Illa Ghee - "Hold You Down"
  - The Postal Service - "Against All Odds (Take a Look at Me Now)"
  - The Unicorns - "Jellybones"
  - Usher & Alicia Keys - "My Boo"
- 2006 - O.A.R. - "Love and Memories"
  - The All-American Rejects - "Move Along"
  - Arctic Monkeys - "I Bet You Look Good on the Dancefloor"
  - Armor for Sleep - "The Truth About Heaven"
  - Atmosphere - "Say Hey There"
  - Cage & Daryl Palumbo - "Shoot Frank"
  - Death Cab for Cutie - "Crooked Teeth"
  - Gym Class Heroes & Patrick Stump - "Cupid's Chokehold"
  - Hellogoodbye - "Shimmy Shimmy Quarter Turn"
  - Imogen Heap - "Hide and Seek"
  - Matisyahu - "Youth"
  - Motion City Soundtrack - "Hold Me Down"
  - Nightmare of You - "I Want to Be Buried in Your Backyard"
  - Panic! at the Disco - "I Write Sins Not Tragedies"
  - Plain White T's - "Hey There Delilah"
  - Red Hot Chili Peppers - "Dani California"
  - Taking Back Sunday - "MakeDamnSure"
  - The Academy Is... - "Checkmarks"
  - The Academy Is... - "Slow Down"
  - The Fray - "Over My Head (Cable Car)"

=== Welcome Back Woodie ===
- 2004: Incubus
  - Beastie Boys
  - Dave Matthews Band
  - The Roots
  - Slum Village

=== Best Video Woodie ===
- 2005: Gorillaz - "Feel Good Inc." (Best Video Woodie - Animated)
  - Aberfeldy - "Love is an Arrow"
  - Aesop Rock - "Fast Cars"
  - Arcade Fire - "Neighborhood 3 (Power Out)"
  - Nine Inch Nails - "Only"
- 2005: Death Cab for Cutie - "Title and Registration" (Best Video Woodie - Live Action)
  - Jack Johnson - "Sitting, Waiting, Wishing"
  - My Chemical Romance - "Helena"
  - Nas & Olu Dara - "Bridging the Gap"
  - Nine Inch Nails - "Only"
- 2006: Gorillaz - "El Mañana" (Best Video Woodie - Animated)
  - Against Me! - "From Her Lips to God's Ears (The Energizer)"
  - Gnarls Barkley - "Crazy"
  - Mark Ronson & Alex Greenwald - "Just"
  - Psapp - "Hi"
- 2006: Thirty Seconds to Mars - "The Kill" (Best Video Woodie - Live Action)
  - Feist - "Mushaboom"
  - Jenny Lewis And The Watson Twins - "Rise Up with Fists!!"
  - Jurassic 5 & Dave Matthews - "Work It Out"
  - The Raconteurs - "Steady, As She Goes"
- 2007: Say Anything - "Wow, I Can Get Sexual Too"
  - Justice - "D.A.N.C.E."
  - Motion City Soundtrack - "Broken Heart"
  - RJD2 - "Work It Out"
  - TV on the Radio - "Province"
- 2008: Motion City Soundtrack - "It Had to Be You"
  - Adele - "Chasing Pavements"
  - Erykah Badu - "Honey"
  - Gnarls Barkley - "Who's Gonna Save My Soul"
  - Vampire Weekend - "Mansard Roof"
- 2009: Matt and Kim - "Lessons Learned"
  - The Dead Weather - "Treat Me Like Your Mother"
  - Death Cab for Cutie - "Grapevine Fires"
  - Anjulie - "Boom"
  - Yeah Yeah Yeahs - "Heads Will Roll"
  - Kid Cudi - "Day 'n' Nite"
- 2011: Chiddy Bang - "Opposite of Adults"
  - The Black Keys - "Tighten Up"
  - Duck Sauce - "Barbra Streisand"
  - Gorillaz, Bobby Womack & Mos Def - "Stylo"
  - Vampire Weekend - "Giving Up the Gun"
- 2012: Best Coast - "Our Deal"
  - Battles - "My Machines"
  - Duck Sauce - "Big Bad Wolf"
  - Gotye & Kimbra - "Somebody That I Used to Know"
  - M83 - "Midnight City"
  - Major Lazer & The Partysquad - "Original Don"
- 2013: Danny Brown - "Grown Up"
  - Best Coast - "The Only Place"
  - Chairlift - "Met Before"
  - Josh Tillman - "Hollywood Forever Cemetery Sings"
  - Major Lazer & Amber Coffman - "Get Free"
  - Of Monsters and Men - "Little Talks"
  - Skrillex & Sirah - "Bangarang"
- 2014: Chance the Rapper, Saba & BJ the Chicago Kid - "Everybody's Something"
  - Arcade Fire - "Afterlife"
  - Disclosure - "Grab Her!"
  - Passion Pit - "Carried Away"
  - Iggy Azalea - "Bounce"
- 2015: Childish Gambino - "Sober"
  - Bad Suns - "Salt"
  - Beyoncé - "7/11
  - FKA Twigs - "Pendulum"
  - Flying Lotus & Kendrick Lamar - "Never Catch Me"
  - Vic Mensa - "Down on My Luck"

=== International Woodie ===
- 2005: Muse
  - Akon
  - Arcade Fire
  - Bloc Party
  - Keane
- 2006: The Subways
  - Arctic Monkeys
  - Cham
  - Corinne Bailey Rae
  - Sia

=== Alumni Woodie ===
- 2005: Green Day
  - Beck
  - Coldplay
  - Common
  - Mos Def
- 2006: AFI
  - Fiona Apple
  - Ghostface Killah
  - Muse
  - Red Hot Chili Peppers
- 2007: Spoon
  - Bright Eyes
  - Modest Mouse
  - Talib Kweli
  - The Shins

=== Performing Woodie ===
- 2007: Muse
  - The Academy Is...
  - Daft Punk
  - Lil Wayne
  - The Rapture
- 2008: Atmosphere
  - Kanye West
  - N.E.R.D
  - Simian Mobile Disco
  - The Ting Tings
- 2009: Green Day
  - 3OH!3
  - Animal Collective
  - Phoenix
  - P.O.S
- 2011: Matt and Kim
  - Girl Talk
  - Mumford & Sons
  - The National
  - Robyn
- 2012: Mac Miller
  - Alabama Shakes
  - The Black Keys
  - Jay-Z & Kanye West
  - Skrillex
  - Swedish House Mafia
- 2014: Ed Sheeran
  - Arcade Fire
  - Jay-Z
  - The National
  - Tyler, The Creator
  - The xx

=== Best Music On Campus Woodie ===
- 2007: Stella by Starlight
- 2008: The Bride Wore Black
- 2009: Hotel of the Laughing Tree

=== College Radio Woodie ===
- 2009: KUPS (University of Puget Sound)
- 2011: WVUM (University of Miami)
- 2012: WASU-FM (Appalachian State University)
- 2013: KSUA (University of Alaska)
- 2014: WESS (East Stroudsburg University)
- 2015: WPTS-FM (University of Pittsburgh)

=== EDM Effect Woodie ===
- 2012: Calvin Harris - "We Found Love"
  - Avicii - "Good Feeling"
  - Benny Benassi - "Beautiful People"
  - Flux Pavilion - "Who Gon Stop Me"
  - Laidback Luke & Steve Aoki - "Turbulence"
  - Martin Solveig & Kele Okereke - "Ready 2 Go"

=== Fomo Woodie ===
- 2013: The Weeknd
  - Death Grips
  - Fiona Apple
  - Flux Pavilion
  - Frank Ocean
  - Jack White
  - Swedish House Mafia

=== Tag Team Woodie ===
- 2013: Kimbra, Mark Foster & A-Trak - "Warrior"
  - A-Trak & Dillon Francis - "Money Makin'"
  - Kanye West, Big Sean, Pusha T & 2 Chainz - "Mercy"
  - Meek Mill & Drake - "Amen"
  - Morgan Page & Tegan and Sara - "Body Work"
  - Steve Aoki, Angger Dimas & Iggy Azalea - "Beat Down"
  - Swedish House Mafia VS Knife Party - "Antidote"

=== Branching Out Woodie ===
- 2013: Macklemore & Ryan Lewis
  - Amanda Palmer
  - Avicii
  - Dan Deacon
  - deadmau5
  - Jack White
  - The xx

=== Chevrolet Sonic Collage Artist Woodie ===
- 2013: The Lonely Biscuits
  - Kiah Victoria
  - Little Sur
  - The Madison Letter

=== Cover Woodie ===
- 2014: Bastille - "We Can't Stop" (Miley Cyrus)
  - The 1975
  - Arctic Monkeys
  - Low
  - Sam Smith
  - Vampire Weekend
- 2015: Taylor Swift - "Riptide" (Vance Joy)
  - Charli XCX - "Shake It Off" (Taylor Swift)
  - Ed Sheeran, Sia & Grouplove - "Drunk in Love" (Beyoncé)
  - Kiesza - "Take Me to Church" (Hozier)
  - Lorde - "Don't Tell 'Em" (Jeremih)
  - Sam Smith - "How Will I Know" (Whitney Houston)
- 2017: Ed Sheeran - "Touch" (Little Mix)
  - Chance the Rapper - "Ultralight Beam" (Kanye West)
  - Elle King - "Jealous" (Nick Jonas) / "Can't Feel My Face" (The Weeknd)
  - James Bay - "Hymn for the Weekend" (Coldplay)
  - MØ - "Love on the Brain" (Rihanna)
  - Panic! at the Disco - "Starboy" (The Weeknd)

=== Did it My Way Woodie ===
- 2014: Beyoncé
  - Arcade Fire
  - Bob Dylan
  - Childish Gambino
  - Kanye West

=== Best Collaboration Woodie ===
- 2014: ASAP Rocky, Skrillex & Birdy Nam Nam - "Wild for the Night"
  - Avicii & Aloe Blacc - "Wake Me Up"
  - Daft Punk & Pharrell Williams - "Get Lucky"
  - Imagine Dragons & Kendrick Lamar - "Radioactive (Remix)"
  - James Blake & Chance the Rapper - "Life Round Here"
  - Just Blaze, Baauer & Jay-Z - "Higher"

=== Artist to Watch ===
- 2015: Years & Years
  - James Bay
  - Kygo
  - MisterWives
  - Rae Sremmurd
  - Raury

=== Co-Sign Woodie ===
- 2015: Hoodie Allen & Ed Sheeran - "All About It"
  - Alesso & Tove Lo - "Heroes (We Could Be)"
  - Eminem, Royce da 5'9", Big Sean, Danny Brown, Dej Loaf & Trick-Trick - "Detroit vs. Everybody"
  - Fences & Macklemore & Ryan Lewis - "Arrows"
  - iLoveMakonnen & Drake - "Tuesday"
  - Jack Ü & Kiesza - "Take Ü There"

=== Next Level Performance Woodie ===
- 2015: Childish Gambino
  - Big Data
  - Drake & Lil Wayne
  - Sia
  - Skrillex

=== Social Climber Woodie ===
- 2015: Jack & Jack
  - DeStorm Power
  - Kenzie Nimmo
  - Lia Marie Johnson
  - Rajiv Dhall

=== Woodie to Watch ===
- 2017: Khalid
  - Anne-Marie
  - DRAM
  - Dua Lipa
  - Gallant
  - Lil Uzi Vert
  - Lil Yachty
  - Marshmello
  - Rag'n'Bone Man
  - Russ

=== Songwriter of the Year ===
- 2017: PartyNextDoor
  - Bibi Bourelly
  - Jack Antonoff
  - Starrah
  - Swae Lee
  - Wynter Gordon
