= MTVU =

American cable television channel

- Country: United States
- Broadcast area: Digital cable

Programming
- Language: English
- Picture format: 480i (SDTV) (optimized for 16:9 widescreen televisions in stretch mode)

Ownership
- Owner: Skydance Global Cable Media (Skydance)
- Parent: MTV Entertainment Group
- Sister channels: List: MTV; MTV2; MTV Classic; MTV Live; MTV Tres

History
- Launched: February 2002; 24 years ago (as an on-campus channel); January 20, 2004; 22 years ago (as a digital cable channel)
- Replaced: VH1 Uno
- Closed: 2018 (as a on-campus channel)
- Replaced by: CheddarU (replacement only on college campuses)

Links
- Website: MTV.com

Availability

Streaming media
- FuboTV: Internet Protocol television (IPTV)

MTVU (formerly stylized as MtvU and mtvU) is an American digital cable television channel. MTVU programming initially served 750 college and university campuses across the United States, as part of internally originated cable systems that were a part of on-campus housing or college closed-circuit television systems. In 2008, it expanded to home cable networks. Music videos played on the channel primarily consist of indie rock, pop-punk and hip-hop along with limited original programming. MTVU also launched a short-lived campus guide and social media network called Campusdailyguide.com in 2008.

In 2018, the MTV Networks on Campus group was sold by Viacom to Cheddar to launch CheddarU, but the digital cable channel remains available to the public through digital cable.

In recent years, MTVU's carriage has declined with the growth of streaming alternatives including its parent company's Paramount+, and has generally been depreciated by Skydance in current retransmission consent negotiations with cable and streaming providers.

== History ==
MTV Networks' proposal for a channel targeting college students, tentatively called MTV University, was announced in February 2002. According to The New York Times, the channel was intended to compete with Burly Bear Network, which was available to 450 campuses and had been attracting nearly a million viewers a week, along with recently launched channels College Television Network (CTN) and Zilo.

In September 2002, with CTN having financial problems and National Lampoon's acquisition of Burly Bear, MTV Networks acquired CTN for $15 million. In 2004, CTN was rebranded as MTVU.

MTVU also formerly owned the review website Rate My Professors and acquired content management software platform for college newspapers College Publisher Network (later College Media Network) parent company Youth Media & Marketing Network (Y2M) in 2006, before selling it in 2010 to Access Network, who sold it to Uloop in 2014.

In February 2008, MTV Networks discontinued VH1 Uno, a sparsely viewed Spanish language music video channel, and replaced it with MTVU, expanding the channel into traditional cable distribution.

In May 2018, Cheddar acquired Viacom's MTV Networks on Campus; outlets associated with that service were converted to carry CheddarU, a secondary feed which streamed content from the flagship financial-news streaming service and segments from Cheddar Big News to nine million students on more than 600 campuses; universities which previously screened MTV Networks on Campus continued to receive CheddarU at no cost in exchange for access to the campus. However, the cable version of MTVU was not affected by the change and continued under an automated form. CheddarU was part of the ChedNet division of Cheddar, a division that focused on having the service available to public screens such as gyms, bars, airports, hotel and other public venues.

In 2018, Spectrum removed MTVU from their current-day packages. Only subscribers with older packages or institutional customers such as hospitals and college campuses maintain access to the network, and very little new content has been produced with the network's depreciation, including transitions and interstital content

== Programming ==
According to its promotional materials from 2004 to 2018, MTVU broadcast exclusive content dedicated to aspects of college life, including music, news, and on-campus events. The channel was the first MTV network to stream all of its content online. On-campus events included the Campus Invasion tour, featuring up-and-coming bands; the GAME0Rz Ball tour, which featured new video games on campus; and Tailgate Tour, which provided MTVU with a presence at campus tailgates. MTVU shows included Dean's List, the MTVU Awards, and MTVU Spring Break.

MTVU has also played a mix of music videos with an emphasis on emerging artists and short interestistial segments focusing on college life. Previously at each hour, MTVU broadcast news updates from ABC News and formerly CBS News before the Viacom/CBS split in 2006, including international news and college-related news. MTV News also aired stories twice an hour on subjects such as music downloading, and musical artists under promotion by MTVU.

Additionally, MTVU aired several original programs produced by and featuring college students. The Freshmen featured three rotating student panelists discussing new music videos and was hosted by Kim Stolz; Stand-In featured celebrities and intellectuals teaching college classrooms for a day, including Nobel Laureates Elie Wiesel and Shimon Peres; Madonna; John McCain; Marilyn Manson; and Jhumpa Lahiri. It also operated a social networking site titled "Meet or Delete", along with Hewlett-Packard.

== Awards ==
=== MTVU Woodie Awards ===
From 2004 to 2017, MTVU broadcast its own annual awards show, the MTV Woodies, which recognized "the music voted best by college students." 2005 winners include Death Cab for Cutie, Motion City Soundtrack, and The Afters; 2006 winners include Thirty Seconds to Mars, Plain White T's, mewithoutYou, The Subways and Gnarls Barkley. The 2006 ceremony was also notable for the altercation of Elijah Wood and Scott from the music blog Stereogum with Jared Leto. The 2008 awards featured a fan-voted category for local college bands called the Best Music On Campus award, where The Bride Wore Black won the award and Chasing Arrows was the runner-up. Winners at the 2008 Woodie Awards included Paramore and There for Tomorrow. Winners at the 2009 Woodie Awards included Green Day, Kings of Leon, Matt and Kim, Never Shout Never, Tech N9ne and Hotel of the Laughing Tree. Winners at the 2014 Woodie Awards included Beyoncé, Drake, Ed Sheeran, and Skrillex. Fall Out Boy became the first inductees at "Hall of Wood" at the 2015 Woodie Awards. They had won the Streaming Woodie award for "Grand Theft Autumn" at the first ceremony in 2004.

=== Awards for students ===
The online game Darfur is Dying was developed as part of an MTVU contest, and other Sudan conflict coverage won MTVU two Emmys, including the 2006 Governors Award. Its Half of Us initiative won a Peabody Award in 2007, "for its extensive research and dedication to fighting depression and creating quick routes to convenient solutions." MTVU also provided grants for student activists, donating $1,000 a week to various student groups. MTVU formerly co-sponsored the ecomagination Challenge with GE, which aimed to empower college students to solve environmental problems on campuses. MTVU also sponsored the Film Your Issue competition, a competition designed to encourage college-age filmmakers to make short political pieces, and aired the winners.

Other opportunities that MTVU provided for college students include Digital Incubator grants, which awarded students who were pioneering the future of broadband content, and the Student Filmmaker Award, which provided the winner with the chance to receive a development deal with MTVU and receive the award at the MTV Movie Awards. Along with these competitions, MTVU made efforts to use student work through its programming.

=== Winners ===
Woodie of the Year

- 2004: Modest Mouse – "Float On"
- 2005: My Chemical Romance
- 2006: Angels & Airwaves
- 2007: Gym Class Heroes
- 2008: Paramore
- 2009: Kings of Leon
- 2011: Wiz Khalifa – "Black and Yellow"
- 2012: Mac Miller
- 2013: Machine Gun Kelly
- 2014: Drake
- 2015: Porter Robinson
- 2017: The Chainsmokers

Breaking Woodie

- 2004: The Killers – "Somebody Told Me"
- 2005: Motion City Soundtrack
- 2006: Plain White T's
- 2007: Boys Like Girls
- 2008: Afterhour
- 2009: Never Shout Never
- 2011: Two Door Cinema Club
- 2012: Machine Gun Kelly
- 2013: Earl Sweatshirt
- 2014: The 1975

Left Field Woodie

- 2004: N.E.R.D. – "Maybe"
- 2005: MewithoutYou
- 2006: Gnarls Barkley
- 2007: Madvillain
- 2008: Chromeo
- 2009: Tech N9ne
- 2011: Kanye West

Good Woodie

- 2004: Sum 41
- 2005: U2
- 2006: Serj Tankian
- 2007: Guster
- 2008: Jack's Mannequin
- 2009: Jamie Tworkowski

Road Woodie

- 2004: Coheed and Cambria
- 2005: Fall Out Boy
- 2006: Taking Back Sunday

Streaming Woodie

- 2004: Fall Out Boy – "Grand Theft Autumn/Where Is Your Boy"
- 2005: The Afters – "Beautiful Love"
- 2006 - O.A.R. – "Love and Memories"

Welcome Back Woodie

- 2004: Incubus

Soundtrack of My Life Woodie

- 2004: Coheed and Cambria - In Keeping Secrets of Silent Earth: 3

The Sophomore Jump Woodie

- 2004: Taking Back Sunday – "A Decade Under the Influence"

The Silent But Deadly Woodie

- 2004: Modest Mouse – "Float On"

Best Video Woodie

- 2005: Gorillaz – "Feel Good Inc." (Best Video Woodie - Animation)
- 2005: Death Cab for Cutie – "Title and Registration" (Best Video Woodie - Live Action)
- 2006: Gorillaz – "El Mañana" (Best Video Woodie - Animation)
- 2006: Thirty Seconds to Mars – "The Kill" (Best Video Woodie - Live Action)
- 2007: Say Anything – "Wow, I Can Get Sexual Too"
- 2008: Motion City Soundtrack – "It Had to Be You"
- 2009: Matt and Kim – "Lessons Learned"
- 2011: Chiddy Bang – "Opposite of Adults"
- 2012: Best Coast – "Our Deal"
- 2013: Danny Brown – "Grown Up"
- 2014: Chance the Rapper, Saba and BJ the Chicago Kid – "Everybody's Something"
- 2015: Childish Gambino – "Sober"

International Woodie

- 2005: Muse
- 2006: The Subways

Alumni Woodie

- 2005: Green Day
- 2006: AFI
- 2007: Spoon

Performing Woodie

- 2007: Muse
- 2008: Atmosphere
- 2009: Green Day
- 2011: Matt and Kim
- 2012: Mac Miller
- 2014: Ed Sheeran

Best Music On Campus Woodie

- 2008: The Bride Wore Black
- 2009: Hotel of the Laughing Tree

College Radio Woodie

- 2009: KUPS (University of Puget Sound)
- 2010: WICB (Ithaca College)
- 2011: WVUM (University of Miami)
- 2012: WASU-FM (Appalachian State University)
- 2013: KSUA (University of Alaska Fairbanks)
- 2014: WESS (East Stroudsburg University)
- 2015: WPTS-FM (University of Pittsburgh)

EDM Effect Woodie

- 2012: Calvin Harris and Rihanna – "We Found Love"

Fomo Woodie

- 2013: The Weeknd

Tag Team Woodie

- 2013: Kimbra, Mark Foster and A-Trak – "Warrior"

Branching Out Woodie

- 2013: Macklemore & Ryan Lewis

Chevrolet Sonic Collage Artist Woodie

- 2013: The Lonely Biscuits

Cover Woodie

- 2014: Bastille – "We Can't Stop" (Miley Cyrus)
- 2015: Taylor Swift – "Riptide" (Vance Joy)
- 2017: Ed Sheeran – "Touch" (Little Mix)

Did It My Way Woodie

- 2014: Beyoncé

Best Collaboration Woodie

- 2014: ASAP Rocky, Skrillex and Birdy Nam Nam – "Wild for the Night"

Woodie to Watch

- 2015: Years & Years
- 2017: Khalid

Co-Sign Woodie

- 2015: Hoodie Allen and Ed Sheeran – "All About It"

Next Level Performance Woodie

- 2015: Childish Gambino

Social Climber Woodie

- 2015: Jack & Jack

Woodie Songwriter of the Year

- 2017: PartyNextDoor
