= Aer (band) =

American hip hop group

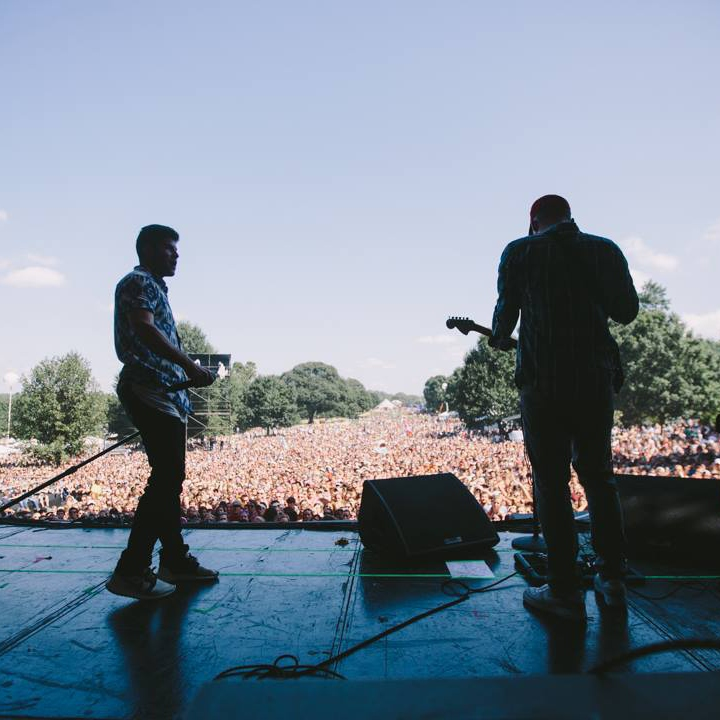
- Aer at Music Midtown 2014

Background information
- Origin: Wayland, MA
- Genres: Hip hop, Alternative, Rap, Reggae, Pop
- Years active: 2010–2016, 2026-Present
- Members: David von Mering; Carter Schultz
- Website: FreshAerMovement.com

Aer is an indie US band consisting of David von Mering and Carter Schultz. The duo hail from Wayland, Massachusetts, a small town in the suburbs west of Boston. They first gained popularity with their debut studio album, The Bright Side in 2012, which reached #85 on the US Billboard 200. Their self-titled second album, Aer (2014), reached #26 a year and a half later. The album One Of A Kind was released on August 14, 2015. On May 25, after a 10-year hiatus, the band announced via Instagram that they had begun work on an unspecified new project.

== Early years ==
=== Mixtapes and What You Need EP (2010–2011) ===
Von Mering, who was born in Portland, Oregon and first grew up in Davis, California met Schultz in elementary school in their hometown of Wayland, Massachusetts. After their first band broke up in their junior year of high school, they created their own brand of music. Their first mixtape, Water On The Moon came out in 2010, followed by their second mixtape, The Reach in May 2011. The duo recorded their first EP, What You Need, later that year.

=== The Bright Side (2012) ===
After graduating from Wayland High School, the two moved to Boston and began to work full-time on their first full-length studio album, The Bright Side, which they released in the summer of 2012. The album reached #85 on the Billboard 200. and was certified Gold. It was followed by their second EP, Strangers in 2013.

== History ==
=== Self-Titled Album (2014) ===
The duo released their self-titled second album on January 21, 2014. The album reached #26 on the Billboard Chart.

=== One of a Kind (2015) ===
Their third full-length album, One of a Kind was released on August 15, 2015, followed by a tour soon after. Among the first stops on the One Of A Kind Tour were the State Theater in Portland, Maine, Best Buy Theater in New York City, and the House of Blues in Boston. The Dutch band Chef'Special and Australian singer Cody Simpson were the openers. They also performed with Slightly Stoopid whose song "Wiseman" they covered. Their song "Floats My Boat" reached over 7 million views on YouTube.

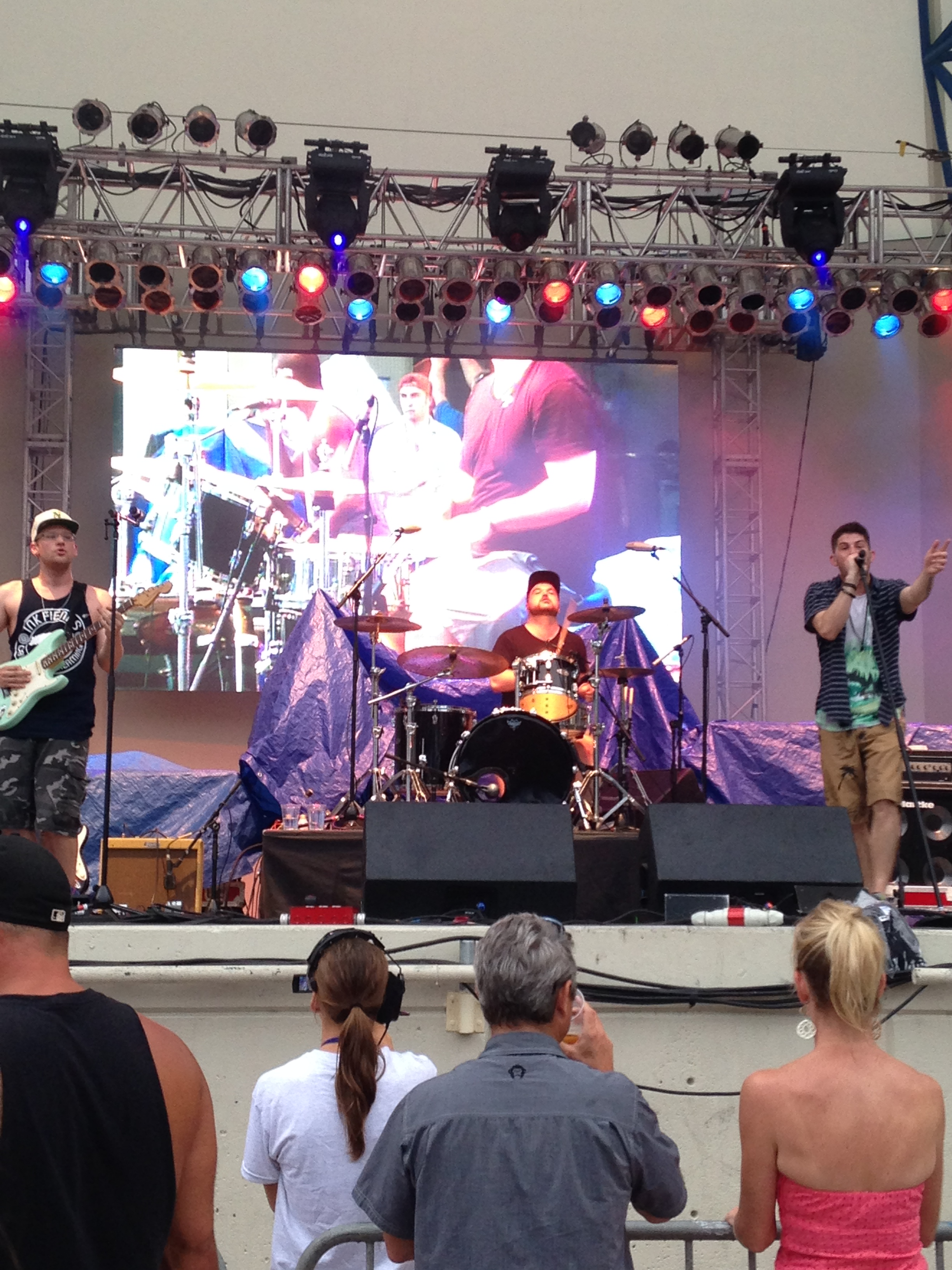
Aer performing at SunFest in West Palm Beach, Florida in 2015

=== The End of Aer (2016) ===
Schultz and Von Mering announced on social media that Aer would no longer be creating new music or performing together, adding that it was a mutual decision with no hard feelings between the two. Both have since started different lives with Schultz and von Mering still working on music but separately. Meanwhile, von Mering also has been seen creating art pieces from his Twitter/X. Schultz moved to Los Angeles as he was living in southern Maine during the COVID-19 pandemic at the time in a journey of self-discovery to pursue a solo career as "Carter Reeves" to find his own voice. During this time, he wrote his first solo EP and shopped it to Ineffable Records.

== Solo projects ==
As of 2020, Carter Reeves (Schultz) has started his own project/band called Surfer Girl. Reeves transitioned from his hip-hop days with Aer to form a laid-back, California-coastal style sound with surf guitar and good vibes. He combines his music with indie-pop, reggae, and surf-rock, as well as hip-hop elements. Surfer Girl has been on tour ever since (Reeves on guitar with a touring drummer and bassist), opening for reggae rock bands throughout the U.S. Surfer Girl's debut full-length studio album, "Sunrise", released on June 10, 2022.

David has produced and written records for numerous other artists, including the certified gold single "Always Been You" by singer Quinn XCII, and "Come Around" by Hoodie Allen and Christian French. He co-wrote the 2020 gold single "West Coast" by DVBBS. In 2021, Von Mering had production and writing credits on "Let It Ride", "Timezones", and "On Time" on the Surfaces album Pacifico. In 2024 he was credited as producer on the Forrest Frank single "Low Key".

== 2026 Announcement ==
On May 25, 2026, the official Aer Instagram account posted that they had been working on new music. They have not released any details about their upcoming work.

== Discography ==
=== Albums ===
List of albums produced, with selected chart positions, showing year released and album name
Title	Year	Peak chart positions				
Title	Year	Billboard 200	U.S. Rap	U.S. Alternative	U.S. Independent	US Rock
The Bright Side	2012	85	10	19	13	31
Aer	2014	26	4	6	3	7
One Of A Kind	2015	—	—	—	—	—
