= EVO Smart Console =

Media PC and video game console

- Also known as: EVO: Phase One
- Developer: Envizions
- Manufacturer: Envizions
- Type: Entertainment PC
- Generation: Seventh generation of video game consoles
- Released: October 20, 2006 (beta); November 20, 2008 (final)
- Discontinued: 2010
- Units sold: "low hundreds"
- Media: DVD, CD
- Operating system: Fedora Linux or Windows
- CPU: 2.9 GHz AMD Athlon (core)
- Memory: 2 GB @ 800 MHz
- Storage: 120 GB hard disk
- Connectivity: Ethernet; 2 × USB 2.0
- Online services: EVO Network
- Backward compatibility: Amiga
- Successor: EVO 2

EVO Smart Console is a line of media PCs and video game consoles marketed in the seventh generation of video game consoles. The system was produced by Envizions, a company based in Anniston, Alabama.

== History ==
On August 10, 2004, the company Envizions was founded. Development of the first EVO console is estimated to have cost roughly 1 million dollars. The beta, called EVO: Phase One, was released on October 20, 2006. The final name of the system was EVO Smart Console, and was released to developers on November 20, 2008, and it cost $250 following a rebate scheme, with an upfront price of $600.

The media debut for the system occurred after the release of developer machines on May 5, 2009. On April 9, 2009, the cumulative number of units sold was 10 at a cost of either $379 for the Linux version or $479 for the Windows version. However, on April 23, 2009 The Guardian reported that the prices for the systems were $279 and $350.

On April 9, 2009, 100 units had been produced.

The EVO 2 is a cancelled game console project first mentioned on an Envizions press release on January 9, 2011, under the name GameBox, it was unveiled on May 25, 2011, with specs, images, and a new name. It was supposed initially to be released in fall 2011, before later being delayed to a 2012 release date. The announcement of a delay also contained the announcement of a limited re-release of the original EVO Smart Console.

On November 28, 2012, Envizions CEO Derrick Samuels announced a new Android console, Oton, from his new startup called 'EnGeniux', effectively ending EVO 2's development. OTON was to be a console capable of some autonomy.

Despite the cancellation of the EVO 2, Envizions developed the EVO 2 DX, a gaming PC running an operating system that is a hybrid of Windows and Android. It has motion capabilities using a standard webcam.

== Specifications ==
=== EVO Smart Console ===
==== Hardware ====
A dual core AMD Athlon 64x2 5600+ (2.90 GHz) central processing unit powers the system, and is accompanied by a ATI HD 3200 graphics processing unit. The system has 2 gigabytes of DDR2 RAM clocked at 800 MHz.

A 120 gigabyte hard disk drive handles local storage, with cloud storage also being supported. Removable digital media was supported with a DVD-ROM Drive, which was compatible with DVD-video, DVD-ROM, DVD-R/RW, DVD+R/RW, CD-ROM, and CD-RW formats. Additionally the system sported one SD card slot. Game media was distributed on SD cards.

Graphics are output on two built in ports, one HDMI port, and one DVI port. Standard-definition or high-definition video could be output. The system sports three audio ports. The system also has two USB 2.0 ports for general IO. The system included two Ethernet ports, allowing it to access the Internet, as well as to allow multiple players from one master hub.

==== Software ====
The system uses the Fedora Linux operating system. A model which cost $100 more ran Microsoft Windows. The system came bundled with three games: SuperTux, Kobo Deluxe, and Kid Destiny. The console also features high definition (HD), Internet access, and was able to run Windows and Amiga-based games. The system relies on proprietary firmware.

A biometric security system supported fingerprint scans, facial, and voice recognition, and biometric linked game saves

The system supported VoIP, Remote desktop software, Internet Television, Streaming content, Akimbo-based video on demand (VOD), and DVR. Most of this was handled by the voice-enabled Media Center Communicator.

==== Latest Revision ====
The latest version had Amiga-based games, and an Akimbo-based video on demand service. It also had a larger, 250 GB hard drive, 1080p resolution, and ran a version of Fedora Linux operating system, Mirrors Evolution. There is open-source software for developers to make games for the system.

=== EVO 2 ===
The EVO 2 uses a Samsung S5PV210 CPU, containing a ARM Cortex-A8 core clocked from containing a 1 GHz up to 1.2 GHz, The system has 512 MB of RAM. An Nvidia Tegra 2 is used as a GPU.

The system uses 2 GB of internal flash storage. Storage is expandable via SD/SDHC memory cards with a SD memory card slot (supports SDHC cards)

Further expansion is possible with 5 USB 2.0 ports

Two different kinds of display output were supported. An "AV Multi Out" port, supported composite video, S-Video (NTSC consoles only). An HDMI out port, supported six-channel PCM linear output through HDMI. Resolutions supported included 1080p, 1080i, 720p, 480p, or 480i, standard 4:3 and 16:9 anamorphic widescreen.

=== EVO 2 DX ===
The system was powered by an undisclosed "quad-core Opteron & Phenom" CPU, working in conjunction with a DirectX 10.1 compatible Integrated ATI Radeon HD 4200. The underlying system made use of an AMD 785G chipset as well as a SB750 chipset.

Internally the system has 4 x SATA II ports capable of 3 Gbit/s with support for RAID 0,1,5,10 through AMD RAIDXpert. For external storage the system has two eSATA ports. Networking is handled by Realtek PCI-Express based Gigabit Ethernet port.

Video output ports include HDMI 1.3, VGA, and DVI-D. Audio is handled by an Integrated ALC662 6-CH HD audio.

Other ports included 1 x 32-bit PCI and 1 x mini-PCI Express,

=== EVO 2 DX Pocket ===
An android powered handheld system.
