= Frat rap =

Subgenre of hip hop

- Stylistic origins: Hip-hop

Regional scenes
- East Coast hip-hop

Frat rap is a subgenre of hip hop music that emerged in the late 2000s. It is sonically easygoing with a straightforward rhyming style and singsong cadence accompanied by a lyrical focal point on coming of age hedonism, which can include campus lifestyle, debaucherous parties, recreational drugs, and women. Frat rap quickly became commercially popular among a predominantly white, college-aged, suburban male audience in the northeastern United States. Asher Roth's 2009 song "I Love College" is considered to have initiated the subgenre. Notable frat rappers such as Mac Miller and Lil Dicky later became successful in mainstream hip hop.

== History ==
The subgenre of frat rap was invented by Asher Roth with the release of his song "I Love College" in 2009. The subgenre grew rapidly and achieved commercial success within hip hop by 2010. In 2010, 18-year-old Mac Miller released two mixtapes K.I.D.S. and Best Day Ever that made him an overnight success and launched him to the forefront of the frat rap phenomenon. In 2011, Aer's debut EP What You Need debuted atop the iTunes Hip-Hop/Rap albums chart, and Mac Miller drawing more than 50,000 fans to Government Center in Boston.

Hoodie Allen's first two albums, People Keep Talking in 2014 and Happy Camper in 2016, landed at number 2 and number 1 on the Billboard rap charts. Lil Dicky's 2015 album Professional Rapper was certified as a gold. By 2015, frat rappers were collaborating with mainstream rap artists such as Snoop Dogg, Rich Homie Quan, and Fetty Wap.

Many of the most successful frat rap artists rejected the title and culture of frat rap and went on to release music that departed from the subject matter and sound of frat rap, being commercially successful in mainstream hip hop. Originally starting out in frat rap, Mac Miller later changed his sound and later became the most successful former frat rapper in mainstream hip hop, with a review of Rolling Stone stating that Miller had shed his frat rap reputation with the release of his album Swimming.

== Description ==
The name frat rap is derived from a shortened form of the word fraternity, which is a university social club.

Frat rappers and their audience were predominantly white, college-aged, suburban males, with the New England region of the United States producing the most frat rappers. The songs had basic rhyming style, a sing-songy cadence, and lyrics about debaucherous parties, doing drugs, and women.

== Notable artists ==
Frat rap was heavily dominated by white rappers, including Roth, Sammy Adams, Hoodie Allen, Chris Webby, OnCue, Cam Meekins, Lil Dicky, Aer, Mike Stud, Mac Miller, and Huey Mack.
