= All-American (disambiguation) =

All-American usually refers to a member of an honorary national sports team.

All-American may also refer to:

- All-American, a fictional character in the Marvel Comics universe
- All American (musical), by Mel Brooks
- All American (EP), a 2012 EP by Hoodie Allen
- All American (album), a 2015 album by Nick Carter
- 82nd Airborne Division, nicknamed All-American, a United States Army unit
- Bally's All American, a video poker game
- Blue Bird All American, a line of school buses built by Blue Bird Corporation
- Mixed-breed dog or All American, usually in the United States
- The Mill City All-Americans, later the Lowell All-Americans, a collegiate summer baseball team now the Old Orchard Beach Raging Tide
