= List of Gankutsuou episodes =

The cover of the first English DVD compilation released by Geneon Entertainment on October 25, 2005.

The episodes of the Japanese anime television series Gankutsuou: The Count of Monte Cristo are directed by Mahiro Maeda and animated and produced by Gonzo. Gankutsuou is based on Alexandre Dumas's French novel, Le Comte de Monte-Cristo and is about the coming-of-age of Albert Morcerf and the revenge of the Count of Monte Cristo.

The series' twenty-four episodes first aired in Japan on TV Asahi between October 6, 2004, and March 30, 2005. (Note: Gankutsuou aired on TV Asahi on Tuesday 26:12, effectively Wednesday at 2:12 a.m. JST.) Media Factory released the series to twelve DVD compilations in Japan between February 25, 2005, and January 25, 2006. On April 10, 2005, Geneon Entertainment received the license for U.S. releases. The U.S. version went straight to six DVD compilations of four episodes each between October 25, 2005, and September 12, 2006. Gankutsuou was also made available over the now defunct Akimbo video-on-demand service, Xbox Live, and via Vuze. On December 27, 2010, the series made its North American debut on the FUNimation Channel. Gankutsuou only has one opening theme and one closing theme, both by Jean-Jacques Burnel. "We Were Lovers" serves as the opening theme for all episodes except episode twenty-three and serves as the closing theme for the season finale, episode twenty-four. "You Won't See Me Coming" was the ending theme for every episode aside from the season finale.

== Episode list ==
| No. | Title | Original release date |
|---|---|---|
| 1 | "At Journey's End, We Meet"; Transliteration: "Tabi no Owari ni Bokura wa Deau" (Japanese: 旅の終わりに僕らは出会う) | October 6, 2004 |
Childhood friends Viscount Albert de Morcerf and Baron Franz d'Epinay, the children of wealthy nobles from Paris, are on vacation and attending an annual Carnival on Luna. Albert is captivated by the Count of Monte Cristo while at an opera performance. While Albert tails the Count, the Count unknowingly drops his pocketwatch, which Albert uses to set up a meeting with the Count. When he tries to return the watch, he and Franz are invited to dinner during the final spectacle of the Carnival. Albert is offered a chance to pardon one of three murderers by choosing one out of three of playing cards, but randomly chooses the boastful murderer, Rocka Buriol, to his surprise and dismay. He tries to lose himself for the night with a girl, but she suddenly pulls a gun on him.
| 2 | "Until the Sun Rises on the Moon"; Transliteration: "Tsuki ni Asahi ga Noboru Made" (Japanese: 月に朝日が昇るまで) | October 13, 2004 |
The girl who Albert was with, Peppo, reveals herself to be a member of Luigi Vampa's gang of thieves and kidnappers. Several aristocrats ask Franz, who is at a ball, where Albert is and warn him that the streets are not safe because of Vampa. When he attempts to return to his hostel, he is met by Rocka Buriol, the murderer who Albert pardoned, who demands fifty million ducats in return for Albert's life. Franz desperately tries to get the money, but is unable to and resorts to begging the Count. Meanwhile, the deadline passes and Vampa's men begin to taunt and torture Albert, but Peppo jumps out to save him. The Count arrives at Vampa's lair along with Franz and they save Albert. When Albert asks how he can repay the Count, the Count replies that Albert can introduce him into Parisian society and tells Albert to keep the pocketwatch. He then tells Albert that Peppo is actually a crossdressing boy, much to his shock and embarrassment.
| 3 | "5/22, Tempest"; Transliteration: "5/22, Arashi" (Japanese: 5/22、嵐) | October 20, 2004 |
Back in Paris, Albert heads out for a picnic with his friends. He travels in the car of his arranged fiancée/second childhood friend Eugénie de Danglars; when the two bicker, Eugénie speeds ahead, causing Franz's car to be driven into a ditch, but Maximilien Morrel, who had been invited and had arrived earlier, single-handedly lifts the car out. They converse and eat, and Morrel becomes infatuated with Valentine de Villefort, Franz's fiancée. When they return to Paris, Albert introduces his male friends to The Count, who is immediately peppered by questions, and is shocked to find Peppo now working as a maid in his family's manson. Robert Beauchamp, Albert's journalist friend, tries to photo and record The Count, but later realizes that nothing has been recorded. After they leave, Albert introduces The Count to his parents.
| 4 | "Mother's Secret"; Transliteration: "Haha no Himitsu" (Japanese: 母の秘密) | October 27, 2004 |
The Count of Monte Cristo stays for dinner with Albert's parents, General Fernand and Mercédès de Morcerf. The Count then converses with General de Morcerf about his military experience. When the Count refuses to eat, Mercédès insists that he eat one of her specialities-(Bouillabaisse), which causes the Count to reminisce about Marseille. Peppo-(who is working as one of the maids in the Morcerf household) taunts Albert into thinking that his mother will fall in love with the Count and he becomes fixated upon his mother's locked drawer after he sees her reminiscing over an old photograph. Albert and his friends later visit the Count's mansion on the Champs-Élysées where they descend into the depths of his house to a city of gold. The Count then gives Albert a sword that was originally given to him by a ships navigator that he once knew.
| 5 | "Do You Love Your Betrothed?"; Transliteration: "Anata wa Konyakusha o Aishiteimasu ka" (Japanese: あなたは婚約者を愛していますか) | November 3, 2004 |
Albert, Franz, Morrel, and Beauchamp visit the Count at his residence, where they meet princess Haydée Tebelin-(who lives with the Count). When Albert and Morrel almost come to blows over the fact that aristocrats marry primarily for wealth and power and almost never for love, it is then that the Count proposes a duel. However, when Albert slips and falls into the pool filled with sharks, the Count dives in to save him.
| 6 | "Her Melancholy, My Melancholy"; Transliteration: "Kanojo no Yūutsu, Boku no Yūutsu" (Japanese: 彼女の憂鬱、僕の憂鬱) | November 10, 2004 |
Albert doubts his feelings for Eugénie, and Eugénie is distressed over both her father's, Baron Jullian Danglars', obsession with finance and her mother's, Madame Victoria de Danglars', affair with Lucien Debray. Meanwhile, the Count visits Baron Danglars to open an account with unlimited credit.
| 7 | "The Secret Flower Garden"; Transliteration: "Himitsu no Hanazono" (Japanese: 秘蜜の花園) | November 17, 2004 |
Princess Haydée, having seen General de Morcerf at the opera, collapses in shock. Morrel seeks Albert's advice on courting Valentine, but things don't go quite as hoped. Madame Danglars, Héloïse Villefort, and her son-(Valentine's younger half-brother) Edouard de Villefort are saved by Ali, one of the Count's servants, when their carriage's horses run amok not far from his residence. The Count later gives Héloïse a weapon disguised as a rubied ring, but their intimate moment is spied upon by Albert. Later, a naked Héloïse starts masturbating to thoughts of The Count before putting on the ring that he had given her.
| 8 | "A Night in Boulogne"; Transliteration: "Burōnyu no Yoru" (Japanese: ブローニュの夜) | November 24, 2004 |
The Count holds a reception for the Morcerfs, Danglars, and Villeforts at his newly acquired estate at Auteuil in Boulogne, where he also introduces the Marquis Andrea Cavalcanti. The Count claims that an evil aura in the mansion emanates from a certain room, and suggests that his guests form search parties to reach it. He eventually reveals his debilitated disease-(that he had contracted while he was in space) to Albert, telling him to keep it a secret from the others, to which he agrees.
| 9 | "I Dreamed a Dark Dream"; Transliteration: "Yami Iro no Yume o Mita" (Japanese: 闇色の夢を見た) | December 1, 2004 |
When Madame Danglars collapses from traumatic shock, Crown Prosecutor Villefort, who is quite familiar with the mansion-(since it used to belong to his father in-law), runs out of patience with the Count. Meanwhile, Albert is poisoned through a water pitcher and then nurtured by the Count-(who had mixed in a special medicine for him), who claims the poison was likely meant for the Villeforts. Back at the Villefort residence, Valentine and her paralyzed grandfather's servant later drink from another pitcher filled with lemonade; the servant dies and Valentine falls unconscious, leaving her in a comatose-like state.
| 10 | "The Letter From Edmond"; Transliteration: "Edomon kara no Tegami" (Japanese: エドモンからの手紙) | December 8, 2004 |
The poisoned Valentine remains unconscious, but despite pleas from Albert and Maximilien Crown Prosecutor Villefort is trying to keep the situation under wraps by treating it as a family matter, and an attempt by Albert to get help from his father fails miserably. Some time later, General de Morcerf, Baron Danglars, Crown Prosecutor Villefort and Gaspard Caderousse arrive at an empty chapel after they had each received a funeral invitation from an unknown Edmond Dantès, but they find the body in the coffin to be a detective who Villefort had hired to investigate the Count, but was eventually found and killed by the Count-(who was disguised as Luigi Vampa) while investigating. With Valentine still in danger, Franz and Maximilien decide to take matters into their own hands and find themselves aided by a most unlikely source.
| 11 | "An Engagement Broken"; Transliteration: "Konyaku, Hadan" (Japanese: 婚約、破談) | December 15, 2004 |
Franz, Morrel, and Raoul de Château-Renaud kidnap Valentine to get her away from the poisoner's clutches, and Morrel takes her to Marseilles. Franz suspects the Count's involvement in the poisonings, but Albert is steadfast. Crown Prosecutor Villefort, however, has already discovered that his wife Héloïse is the culprit. Meanwhile, Baron Danglars decides to break off Eugénie's engagement to Albert.
| 12 | "Encore"; Transliteration: "Ankōru" (Japanese: アンコール) | January 5, 2005 |
Cavalcanti is making moves on Eugénie, while Baron Danglars is trying to stop Albert from attending her concert. With Debray's help, Albert manages to attend, and both he and Eugénie begin to realize their true feelings for each other. After the performance, Crown Prosecutor Villefort attempts to arrest the Count of Monte Cristo.
| 13 | "Haydée"; Transliteration: "Ede" (Japanese: エデ) | January 12, 2005 |
Crown Prosecutor Villefort's plan to arrest the Count of Monte Cristo backfires. Meanwhile, Baron Danglars cuts off financial assistance to General Morcerf. Franz and Debray hack into the Ministry of the Interior's database in order to find out more about the Count. Albert meets Haydée, who informs him on how her father was the ruler of Janina who had requested the aid of Earth when the Earth-Eastern Empire war broke out. However, the Earth reinforcements betrayed Haydée's father, labeling him as a traitor and ultimately murdering him. Once she and family had lost everything, Haydée and her mother-(the former queen of Janina) were sold into slavery; she was later given a dagger by her mother to keep in case she were in any risk of serious danger and to take her own life if necessary. After her mother died sometime later, an orphaned Haydée encountered the Count who eventually adopted her and took her under his wing.
| 14 | "Lost Souls"; Transliteration: "Samayou Kokoro" (Japanese: さまよう心) | January 19, 2005 |
Crown Prosecutor Villefort is arrested for attempting to murder the Count of Monte Cristo. Cavalcanti convinces Baron Danglars to announce his engagement to Eugénie, throwing Albert into depression.
| 15 | "The End of Happiness, The Beginning of Truth"; Transliteration: "Shiawase no Owari, Shinjitsu no Hajimari" (Japanese: 幸せの終わり、真実の始まり) | January 26, 2005 |
Albert goes on a space cruise with the Count of Monte Cristo. Franz, continuing to investigate Gankutsuou, learns about the Chateau d'If from Monsieur Noirtier. Haydée testifies before the National Assembly about General Morcerf's crimes on Janina and his role in her enslavement.
| 16 | "Scandal"; Transliteration: "Sukyandaru" (Japanese: スキャンダル) | February 2, 2005 |
Albert, having returned from space, learns of the brewing scandal around his father General Morcerf and believes Beauchamp to be responsible. However, he soon learns the truth of their heritage from his mother Mercédès.
| 17 | "The Confession"; Transliteration: "Kokuhaku" (Japanese: 告白) | February 9, 2005 |
Albert, having learned from the Count that everything that has happened so far has been planned out of necessity, challenges him to a duel. Albert meets with Franz, who has returned to Paris. Mercédès, having recognized Edmond Dantès in the Count, comes to see him.
| 18 | "The Duel"; Transliteration: "Kettō" (Japanese: 決闘) | February 16, 2005 |
Having drugged Albert's alcohol so that he sleeps in, Franz attends the duel with the Count in his place. Albert only arrives in time to hear Franz's dying words.
| 19 | "Even If I Should Stop Being Me"; Transliteration: "Tatoe, Boku ga Boku de Naku Natta to Shite mo" (Japanese: たとえ、僕が僕でなくなったとしても) | February 23, 2005 |
Albert, upset that Franz had to die because of his parents' old love triangle, decides to leave the Morcerf household residence. However, with his status as an aristocrat revoked, he cannot even exit the town gates without having a permit. Meanwhile, Baron Danglars, facing the prospect of bankruptcy, decides to advance the plans for Eugénie and Cavalcanti's wedding.
| 20 | "Farewell, Eugénie"; Transliteration: "Sayonara, Yūjenī" (Japanese: さよなら、ユージェニー) | March 2, 2005 |
With Peppo's help, Albert crashes Eugénie's wedding, and the police soon arrives to arrest Cavalcanti, who is really Benedetto, a wanted criminal. In the confusion, Albert and Eugénie escape, ending up at the airport where they reveal their true feelings for each other and share a heartfelt kiss before Eugénie leaves for New York.
| 21 | "The True Identity of the Nobleman"; Transliteration: "Kikōshi no Shōtai" (Japanese: 貴公子の正体) | March 9, 2005 |
Baron Danglars, in an attempt to outmaneuver his creditors, skips town with a suitcase handcuffed to him containing five trillion francs. However, the Count appears on the same plane, demanding money from him. At Crown Prosecutor Villefort's trial for poisoning and for attempted murder, Benedetto makes an appearance and reveals the truth of his real heritage.
| 22 | "Counterattack"; Transliteration: "Gyakushū" (Japanese: 逆襲) | March 16, 2005 |
With Crown Prosecutor Villefort-(who is now a permanent resident at a mental asylum following his arrest) mentally insane after Benedetto had drugged him with a poison-filled needle-(as ordered by the Count) and Baron Danglars trapped and naked in outer space in a drifting ship full of gold bars, only General Morcerf remains to be dealt with. While the Count recounts his backstory to Albert, General Morcerf stages a coup d'etat and declares martial law in Paris; causing massive destruction all over the city.
| 23 | "Edmond Dantès"; Transliteration: "Edomon Dantesu" (Japanese: エドモン·ダンテス) | March 23, 2005 |
With Mercédès and Albert shot by Morcerf, nothing stands in the way of his showdown with the Count of Monte Cristo. However the battle is interrupted when Haydée intervenes while trying to stop their fight and confesses her feelings to the Count, saying that she's in love with him; General Morcerf then holds Haydée hostage at gunpoint, and the Count orders the wounded Albert to be held hostage as well. The standoff is broken when Albert pleads with both men; however, with his orders being disobeyed for the first time, the Count, now completely dominated by Gankutsuou, shoots Albert himself, but Baptistin throws himself in front of Albert and is wounded. After a confrontation between Albert and the Count, Gankutsuou's hold over Edmond Dantès is broken as Albert hugs the possessed Count and kisses the side of his cheek, which releases Gankutsuou's spirit out of his body-(leaving him mortal) and he finally passes away after succumbing to his puncture wound from the broken shard of Franz's sword that was still lodged into his heart-(which caused him to bleed to death) and telling everyone to remember him as Edmund Dantes. As Albert, Haydée, and the others flee to safety, Morcerf commits suicide in expiation for the crimes he committed against all those he loved, including Edmond.
| 24 | "At the Shore"; Transliteration: "Nagisa Nite" (Japanese: 渚にて) | March 30, 2005 |
Fernand Mondego and Edmond Dantès/the Count are both dead. Five years later, a peace treaty with the Eastern Empire is finally being signed. Morrel returns to his beloved wife Valentine in Marseilles and plans to rebuild the Morrel trading business. Eugénie is now a world famous concert pianist and is returning to Paris. Haydée, now attended by the Count's former servants Bertuccio, Baptistin, and Ali and living on Janina, is preparing for her coronation. Benedetto and Caderousse are still at large. Peppo is now the top fashion model. A now widowed Mercédès visits the graves of both Fernand and Edmond in Marseilles. Albert, now using the name "Albert Herrera" and having rebuilt his life, also returns to Paris to visit his abandoned family home, where he finds an old letter written by Edmond to Mercédès showing the love he had for Mercédès before his betrayal and imprisonment, realizing that the Count has been with him his entire life. Later, at Franz's grave, Albert reminisces about the past five years and the lessons he has learned. The series ends as Albert rushes to the nearby church where he hears Eugénie playing the song that she had written for him.
