= WVUM =

Radio station at the University of Miami

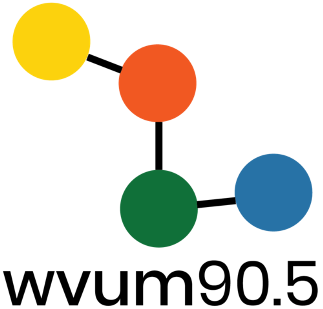
- Coral Gables, Florida; United States
- Broadcast area: Miami metropolitan area
- Frequency: 90.5 MHz
- Branding: The Voice of the University of Miami

Programming
- Format: Electronic, EDM, Alternative

Ownership
- Owner: WVUM, Inc.; (University of Miami)

History
- First air date: 1967
- Call sign meaning: Voice of the University of Miami

Technical information
- Licensing authority: FCC
- Facility ID: 74175
- Class: A
- ERP: 5,900 watts (directional)
- HAAT: 53.0 meters (173.9 ft)
- Transmitter coordinates: 25°43′2.00″N 80°16′48.00″W

Links
- Public license information: Public file; LMS
- Website: wvum.org

WVUM (90.5 FM) is a non-commercial alternative and electronic music college radio station at the University of Miami in Coral Gables, Florida in the United States and broadcasting over-the-air to the Miami metropolitan area and streaming online via Internet radio.

The station is owned by WVUM, Inc., a corporation owned by an advisory board composed of faculty and students at the University of Miami. Air talent and station management are University of Miami students. Most positions are volunteer but some management positions are paid.

WVUM is the flagship station of Miami Hurricanes sports, airing most events live with color commentary by the station's sports staff. In February 2011, WVUM's Sports Department was invited to be the broadcasters on the University of Miami's web stream broadcasts on hurricanesports.com. The station has been a featured presence at local Miami arts festivals, including Art Basel in Miami Beach, Ultra Music Festival, and Miami Music Week.

== Background ==
WVUM is the noncommercial and fully student-run radio station broadcasting out of the University of Miami. The station was founded in 1967 as a pirate radio station hidden in the Eaton Hall dormitory on the university's campus. WVUM has since evolved into a licensed station with music programming (with a slight electronic bent), public affairs and news content and sports programs.

Licensed to Coral Gables, Florida, WVUM serves the University of Miami and the surrounding communities. The station operates with 5.9 Kilowatts directional and covers most of Miami-Dade County and streams live globally at: wvum.org

== History ==
=== 20th century ===
In 1967, a group of engineering students in Mahoney Hall, a University of Miami dormitory, created an unlicensed transmitter and began operating an illegal radio station. Shortly after being discovered by the FCC, it was requested that they discontinue broadcasting. In order to amend relations, the University of Miami decided to register the station. The station was initially licensed by Mahoney Residence Hall Association, Inc., which provided the station with early support.

The first call letters that was requested by the station to the FCC was WVOH (Voice of Hurricanes), later changed to WIBS (IBIS), which was later changed to and approved by the FCC as WVUM, standing for the Voice of the University of Miami.

For the first few years of its existence, University of Miami events and news were WVUM's sole programming.

In February 1968, WVUM received its license to broadcast a 10-watt non-commercial, educational radio station, which was barely enough power to be heard throughout the university campus. The station was located on the second floor of the Whitten University Center.

In 1972, WVUM went stereo, and in 1978, the station completely renovated the studio facilities on the second floor of the Whitten University Center. In Spring 1977, Mahoney Residence Hall Association changed its name to WVUM, Inc, the title it still holds today.

In 1981, the FCC requested all 10-watt stations to increase to at least 100 watts, and WVUM made increased to 365 watts. Over the years, the station's power level has increased from 35w ERP to 365w ERP, to 1.3Kw ERP, and finally to its present 5.9Kw ERP directional, away from a second adjacent channel station on 90.9, in the upper Florida Keys to the south.

For almost all of the 1980s, the station had a rock music format. In the 1990s, the station had a grunge period. In 1993, the station expanded to 1,300 watts.

In 1999, the station moved to a larger space downstairs in the Whitten University Center, which offered two studios and an office, and was renovated for WVUM's use. The space previously was a barber shop that went bankrupt and a bowling alley motor room.

=== 21st century ===
In 2000, the station began broadcasting online at: wvum.org In 2007, Miami New Times recognized it as the Choice Best FM Radio Station. In 2008, in recognition of WVUM's 40th anniversary, IKEA aesthetically renovated the office in the University Center. In 2009, WVUM was recognized as the Miami New Times’ Reader’s Choice as "Best FM Radio Station". In March 2011, WVUM was awarded mtvU's Woodie Award for "Best College Radio Station".

In 2013, the station expanded to 5,900 watts. In Summer 2015, WVUM's office was modernized and its space was increased.

In 2021, WVUM was recognized by Miami New Times as "Best Radio Station". Zoom Out has recognized WVUM as one of the top noncommercial streaming radio stations in the country.

WVUM offers both rotation and specialty shows. Rotation shows feature recent albums selected by the music directors and Music Staff, while specialty shows focus on a specific genre, style, or concept.

The radio station also offers news, public affairs, and sports programming. WVUM is the flagship station for Miami Hurricanes baseball. It also covers women's volleyball, and basketball and men's football and basketball. The news department produces hourly newscasts, featured news, public service announcements, and community outreach programs.

While WVUM has a corporate and advisory board consisting of staff advisors, the station is student-run by the main decision-making entity: the executive board, which consists of 18 students. The WVUM staff focuses on programming, community involvement, and engaging with Miami's art and music scene. The station's unofficial mascot is Manny the Manatee.

Listeners of WVUM tend to be within the age range of 16 to 49-years-old. The station's online stream is well above the average for college radio stations, and receives hits internationally.

WVUM works with many institutions active in Miami music and arts, including Miami Art Museum, Roofless Records, Ultra Music Festival, and others. As of 2024, WVUM's format is largely indie electronic and indie rock.

== Notable alumni ==
- Dave Aizer, television host and writer
- DJ EFN, record executive and deejay
- Joshua Johnson, MSNBC host

== See also ==
- Campus radio
- List of college radio stations in the United States
