= Make It Rain (Foy Vance song) =

2014 song by Foy Vance

Song by Foy Vance
- Songwriter: Foy Vance

"Make It Rain" is a song by Northern Irish musician Foy Vance. It was made famous by Ed Sheeran in 2014 when it was used in the television series Sons of Anarchy. Two additional versions of this song charted in the United States after they were performed on The Voice, one by Matt McAndrew in 2014 and another by Koryn Hawthorne in 2015.

== Ed Sheeran version ==
"Make It Rain"

Single by Ed Sheeran

from the album Sons of Anarchy and x (Wembley Edition)
- Released: 2 December 2014
- Recorded: 2014
- Genre: Blues rock
- Length: 6:44
- Label: Atlantic
- Songwriters: Foy Vance; Ed Sheeran
- Producer: Jake Gosling

Ed Sheeran singles chronology
"All About It" (2014)	"Make It Rain" (2014)	"Bloodstream" (2015)

Ed Sheeran's recording of the song was used in the penultimate episode of season 7 of the television series Sons of Anarchy. Sheeran was a fan of the music for the series and mentioned it in a tweet. When the show's creator (Kurt Sutter) read the tweet, he proposed that Sheeran record a song for one of the episodes. As Sheeran was touring with Foy Vance at the time, and as one of Vance's songs (Make It Rain) started with the lyrics "When the sins of my father / Weigh down in my soul", Sheeran thought it was appropriate for the series. With Vance's approval, Sheeran recorded the song to be used in the episode "Red Rose," broadcast on 2 December 2014.

=== Charts ===
Chart (2014–2015)	Peak position
Australia (ARIA)	26
Canada Hot 100 (Billboard)	27
Czech Republic Airplay (ČNS IFPI)	41
France (SNEP)	103
Ireland (IRMA)	58
New Zealand (Recorded Music NZ)	23
Scotland Singles (OCC)	23
Slovakia Airplay (ČNS IFPI)	47
UK Singles (OCC)	38
US Billboard Hot 100	34

=== Certifications ===
Region	Certification	Certified units/sales
Canada (Music Canada)	Platinum	80,000^{‡}
New Zealand (RMNZ)	Gold	15,000^{‡}
^{‡} Sales+streaming figures based on certification alone.

== Matt McAndrew version ==
=== Charts ===
Chart (2014)	Peak position
US Billboard Hot 100	81

== Koryn Hawthorne version ==
=== Charts ===
Chart (2015)	Peak position
US Billboard Hot 100	84
