= Natalie Warner =

American singer

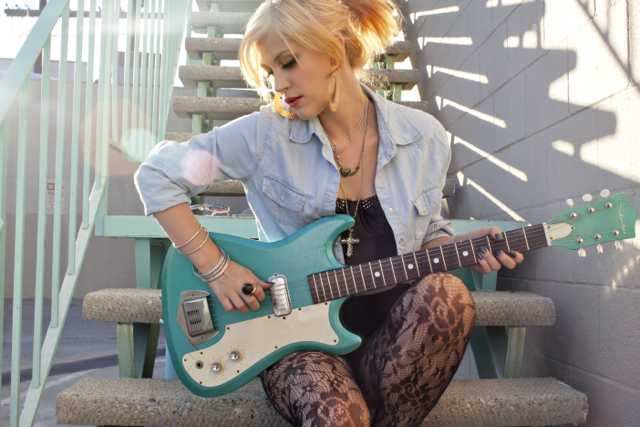

Background information
- Born: Natalie Warner; December 19, 1989 (age 36); Shreveport, Louisiana United States
- Origin: Los Angeles, California; United States
- Genres: Pop, alternative
- Occupations: Singer, songwriter, producer
- Years active: 2006–2012
- Label: Capitol (2006–2007)

Natalie Warner (born December 19, 1989) is an American singer, songwriter, and producer.

== Career ==
In 2006, at the age of 16, Warner was signed to a deal with Capitol Records. During this time she worked with Grammy-winning producer Mike Elizondo. The deal was short-lived, however, as the label decided it would be best for Warner to make a piano-vocal only record, so Warner chose to exit the recording agreement.

She later recorded with Elizondo and engineer Scott McKay Gibson, the result of which was the "Strange Bird EP," released in June 2009. Warner and Gibson co-produced the EP, and played nearly every instrument on it. The album also featured a co-write with Josh Farro, formerly of the band Paramore. The single "I Will Take You Under" achieved success on Clear Channel's iHeartRadio, where it was No. 1 for 3 months atop their "NEW!" Signed Adult chart. The music video for the song was featured as the AOL Music Video of the Day in July 2009. That same year, Warner also received the Abe Olman Scholarship for Excellence in Songwriting from the Songwriters Hall of Fame for "I Will Take You Under". Most recently, the song "I Will Take You Under" has started to receive airplay on BBC Radio 2 in the UK. In March 2012, Natalie appeared on the Hoodie Allen single "No Interruption," singing the vocal "oohs" that feature nearly the duration of the song. On December 21, 2012, Natalie Warner released a music video for the song "Always Your Woman."

In 2013, Warner moved from Los Angeles, California to Washington, D.C. to attend George Washington University, where she earned a B.A. in International Affairs. During this time, she took down most of her music from online streaming services and informally ended her music career.

== Discography ==
Year	Album
2009	"Strange Bird EP"

=== Singles ===
Year	Single
2009	"I Will Take You Under"

=== Music videos ===
Year	Single	Director
2008	"I Will Take You Under"	Kurt Nishimura
2012	"Always Your Woman"	Natalie Warner
