= People Keep Talking =

Studio album by Hoodie Allen
- Released: October 14, 2014
- Recorded: August 2012–2014
- Length: 48:03
- Label: ADA
- Producer: Alex 'AK' Kresovich; Battleroy; Dylan McDougle; !llmind; Jared Evan; Jason Mater; Parrish Warrington; RJ Ferguson; Wade Ridenhour

Hoodie Allen chronology
All American (2012)	People Keep Talking (2014)	Happy Camper (2016)

Singles from People Keep Talking
- 1. "Show Me What You're Made Of" Released: May 7, 2014; 2. "Movie" Released: August 25, 2014; 3. "Dumb for You" Released: September 9, 2014; 4. "All About It" Released: October 13, 2014

People Keep Talking is the debut studio album by American hip-hop recording artist Hoodie Allen. It was announced on August 19 with a pre-order date of August 25 and a release date of October 14, 2014. The album features 14 tracks.

== Release and promotion ==
People Keep Talking was available to stream through iTunes First Play on October 7, 2014. The album was officially released on October 14, 2014, on iTunes, becoming Allen's second album to do so where it reached the number two spot on the albums chart. The album was also released through physical CDs which was his first work to be released that way. One review declared the album release "expertly promoted" and remarked that Hoodie is a "marketing whiz" due to the release of high quality music videos for majority of the songs. Promoting the release, Hoodie performed "All About It" on Good Day Philadelphia.

== Reception ==
A reviewer from Muhlenberg Weekly wrote that People Keep Talking is Hoodie's best work to date and "showed off his fast flow and clever lines".

== Commercial performance ==
The album debuted at number eight on the Billboard 200 chart, with sales of 30,246 copies in the United States.

The fourth single off the album, "All About It" featuring Ed Sheeran, peaked at number 71 on the Billboard Hot 100 chart The song also charted around Europe, peaking in the top ten in Germany and Austria.

== Track listing ==
No.	Title	Writer(s)	Producer(s)	Length
1.	"100 Percent of Something"	Steven Markowitz; Ramon Ibanga, Jr.	!llmind	3:37
2.	"People Keep Talking"	Markowitz; Ibanga; Jared Siegel; Ernest Isley; Marvin Isley; O'Kelly Isley, Jr.; Ronald Isley; Rudolph Isley	!llmind	3:33
3.	"Movie"	Markowitz; Parrish Warrington; RJ Ferguson	RJF; Parrish Warrington; Dylan McDougle^{[b]}	3:59
4.	"Won't Mind" (featuring MAX)	Markowitz; Warrington; Ferguson; Max Schneider	RJF; Parrish Warrington	4:12
5.	"All About It" (featuring Ed Sheeran)	Markowitz; Ed Sheeran; Warrington; Ferguson	RJF; Parrish Warrington	3:25
6.	"Dumb for You"	Markowitz; Warrington; Ferguson	RJF; Parrish Warrington; Dylan McDougle^{[b]}	3:11
7.	"Sirens" (featuring Alex Wiley)	Markowitz; Ferguson; Alex Wiley	RJF	3:57
8.	"Act My Age"	Markowitz; Roy Battle; Jason Mater	Battleroy; Jason Mater^{[a]}	3:12
9.	"Numbers"	Markowitz; Siegel; Dylan McDougle	Jared Evan	3:29
10.	"Get It on the Low"	Markowitz; Warrington; Ferguson	RJF; Parrish Warrington; Dylan McDougle^{[b]}	3:42
11.	"Show Me What You're Made Of"	Markowitz; Warrington; Ferguson	RJF; Parrish Warrington; Dylan McDougle^{[b]}	4:13
12.	"The Real Thing"	Markowitz; Warrington; Ferguson	RJF; Parrish Warrington	2:49
13.	"Overtime"	Markowitz; Siegel	Jared Evan; Dylan McDougle^{[b]}	3:23
14.	"Against Me" (featuring MAX)	Markowitz; Alex Kresovich; Wade Ridenhour	Alex 'AK' Kresovich; Jared Evan; Wade Ridenhour^{[b]}	4:01
Total length:				48:03

Best Buy bonus tracks
No.	Title	Writer(s)	Producer(s)	Length
15.	"Marlie's Song (feat. Jared Evan)"	Markowitz; Siegel	Jared Evan	3:19
16.	"Horoscope (feat. Travis Garland)"	Markowitz; Ferguson	RJF	3:17
Total length:				54:39

Notes

- ^[a] denotes a co-producer.
- ^[b] denotes an additional producer.

Sample credit

- "People Keep Talking" contains an interpolation of "Between the Sheets", written by E. Isley, M. Isley, O.K. Isley, R. Isley, R. Isley, and C. Jasper.

== Personnel ==
Credits for People Keep Talking adapted from AllMusic.

- Miles Arntzer – horn arrangements
- Battle Roy – instrumentation, producer
- Nick Bilardello – art direction
- Jared Evan – producer, vocals, vocals (background)
- RJ Ferguson – producer
- Chris Gehringer – mastering
- Ian Gottshalk – guitar
- Jairus Holt – engineer
- Hoodie Allen – primary artist
- !llmind – producer
- Alex 'AK' Kresovich – producer
- Steven Markowitz – A&R
- Raymond Mason – brass
- Jason Mater – guitar, producer
- Max – featured artist
- Dylan McDougle – additional production, engineer, mixing
- Jay O'Byrne – art direction
- Wade Ridenhour – additional production, piano
- Craig Rosen – A&R
- Angelica Salem – vocals (background)
- Max Schneider – vocals
- Ed Sheeran – featured artist
- Matt Vogel – photography
- Jas Walton – saxophone
- Parrish Warrington – producer
- Dan Weston – mixing
- Alex Wiley – featured artist

== Charts ==
=== Weekly charts ===
Chart (2014–15)	Peak position
Canadian Albums (Billboard)	24
German Albums (Offizielle Top 100)	65
Swiss Albums (Schweizer Hitparade)	68
US Billboard 200	8
US Top R&B/Hip-Hop Albums (Billboard)	2
US Top Rap Albums (Billboard)	2

=== Year-end charts ===
Chart (2014)	Position
US Top R&B/Hip-Hop Albums (Billboard)	74
