= All American (EP) =

EP by Hoodie Allen
- Released: April 10, 2012
- Recorded: 2011–2012
- Genre: Hip hop
- Length: 27:13
- Label: Self-released
- Producer: RJF

Hoodie Allen chronology
All American (2012)	People Keep Talking (2014)

Singles from All American
- 1. "No Interruption" Released: March 29, 2012; 2. "No Faith in Brooklyn" Released: April 10, 2012

All American is the debut EP by American hip hop artist Hoodie Allen. It was released on April 10, 2012, and debuted at number 10 on the US Billboard 200 albums chart. "No Interruption" is the first single off the album.

== Background ==
On March 4, 2012, Hoodie announced via Twitter that his upcoming EP would be titled All American. He decided on this title because he credits his success to America, because he felt the songs showcased his best music to date, and because of a hometown restaurant with the same title. Hoodie spent five months developing the album, building tracks from scratch with his producer, RJF, instead of using sampled beats. Regarding the writing process, Hoodie states that "I would describe it as liberating... It was like, 'Okay, I hear this idea in my head, I hear these original ideas, [and] I'm putting them and piecing them together.'" On March 29, 2012, Hoodie released the first single from All American entitled "No Interruption." The music video was posted to YouTube and was featured on the front page the same day. As of May 1, 2018, it has gained more than 34 million views.

== Release and promotion ==
The night before the album's release, Hoodie announced that he would personally call every fan that buys the album. All American was released on April 10, 2012. Following the rapid success of the EP, Hoodie released the music video for his second single, "No Faith in Brooklyn", which features Jhameel, as a gift to his fans. Over the months of April and May, Hoodie made a 22-stop tour across the US in support of All American, featuring Wax, Jared Evan, and others varying from show to show. On March 23, 2012, Hoodie hinted at an upcoming announcement of a "UK tour for June", and officially announced the four dates on April 19 via Facebook. The "I Work Better in the UK Tour" was his first time performing overseas.

== Commercial performance ==
In the United States, All American debuted at No. 10 on the Billboard 200, with 28,000 copies sold in its first week.

== Track listing ==
No.	Title	Writer(s)	Producer(s)	Length
1.	"Lucky Man"	Steven Markowitz; Teddy Rosenthal	Roxpin	2:45
2.	"No Interruption"	Markowitz; RJ Ferguson; Carlos St John; Grant Michaels; Amir Salem; Natalie Warner	Ferguson; WNDRBRD	3:35
3.	"Eighteen Cool"	Markowitz; Jason Weiss	Jay Vice	3:28
4.	"Top of the World"	Markowitz; Rosenthal; Ferguson	Roxpin; Ferguson	3:32
5.	"No Faith in Brooklyn" (featuring Jhameel)	Markowitz; Ferguson	Ferguson	3:21
6.	"Small Town"	Markowitz		3:34
7.	"High Again"	Markowitz; Ferguson	Ferguson	3:30
8.	"Ain't Gotta Work"	Markowitz; Ferguson	Ferguson	3:28
Total length:				27:13

== Personnel ==
- Hoodie Allen – composer, vocals
- RJF – composer, producer
- Grant "WNDRBRD" Michaels – composer, producer
- Teddy "Roxpin" Rosenthal – composer, producer
- Jay Vice – composer, producer
- Carlos St John – composer
- Amir Salem – composer
- Natalie Warner – composer, vocals
- DJ Fresh Direct – engineer, mixing tracks 1, 2, 4, 7
- Mike Roberts – mixing tracks 3, 5, 6, 8
- Chris Gehringer – mastering
- Will Quinnell – mastering assistant
- Frans Mernick – engineer
- Pran Bandi – engineer
- Chris Leon – engineer
- Dennis Drummond – guitar
- Spencer Stewart – bass
- Ben Alleman – piano, organ, synthesizer
- Nick Toyne – backing vocals
- Jhameel – vocals

== Charts ==
=== Weekly charts ===
Chart (2012)	Peak position
Canadian Albums (Billboard)	18
UK Albums (OCC)	64
US Billboard 200	10
US Top R&B/Hip-Hop Albums (Billboard)	3

=== Year-end charts ===
Chart (2012)	Position
US Top R&B/Hip-Hop Albums (Billboard)	86
