= ¡Sorpresa! =

American Spanish-language children's TV channel

- Country: United States
- Broadcast area: National; Worldwide
- Headquarters: West Palm Beach, Florida

Ownership
- Owner: Olympusat

History
- Launched: March 15, 2003

Links
- Website: www.olympusat.com/networks/sorpresa

Availability

Streaming media
- VEMOX: Internet Protocol television

¡Sorpresa! ("Surprise!" in Spanish) is an American Spanish-language children's television channel.

The channel is currently available for the United States and Puerto Rico on Charter Spectrum, Claro Puerto Rico, Cox Communications, Frontier Communications, Grande Communications, Liberty Puerto Rico, RCN, Suddenlink, and member systems of the National Cable TV Cooperative. ¡Sorpresa! is also available through third-party mobile TV and broadband platforms, including VEMOX, Brightcove and MobiTV. The channel was also formerly available through Akimbo.

== History ==
In August 2009, Olympusat Inc. bought the channel ¡Sorpresa! from its previous owner, Firestone/Juniper Content Corp.

On March 1, 2019, Verizon Fios removed the channel from its lineup.
