= Long Island School for the Gifted =

- (LISG)

Location
- 815 Convent Road; Syosset, New York; USA; 40.82290°N 73.48354°W

Information
- Type: Private School
- Established: 1980
- Founder: Carol Yilmaz
- Head of school: Patricia Geyer
- Grades: Pre-K-9
- Enrollment: ~130 (2020-21)
- Colors: Green and White
- Mascot: Lion
- Accreditation: New York State Association of Independent Schools
- Website: Long Island School for the Gifted

Long Island School for the Gifted (LISG) is a private school (pre-kindergarten to 9th grade) for gifted children located in Syosset, New York in Nassau County.

== School history ==
Long Island School for the Gifted was founded in 1980 by Carol Yilmaz. Her mission was to bring more advanced education to students who felt like they were not being challenged enough in school. Along with other members known as the "founding mommies", LISG was a reality. It did not reside at 165 Pidgeon Hill Road until the start of the 1984 school year and now resides in a new location for 2025 - 815 Convent Road Syosset, NY 11791, occupying the former location of the Catholic all girls high school Our Lady of Mercy Academy. Since then, LISG has become one of the most advanced schools on Long Island, where alumni have gone to Ivy League colleges and have won numerous awards..

== Student acceptance and life ==
In order to be accepted into LISG, students must take an IQ test and have a score of over 130. LISG admits students of any race, sex, and ethnicity. Students at LISG will learn at least one to three grades above grade level in their respected subjects. They offer regents for students and the PSAT is taken by 7th graders for enrollment in the Center for Talented Youth Talent Search. Student class sizes are around 12-16 people forming an easier class chemistry with the teachers and students. There are currently 46 staff members, teachers, and administrators.

== School setup ==
LISG students are divided into three levels:

- Lower School: Pre-Kindergarten through 3rd Grade
- Middle School: 4th Grade through 6th Grade
- Upper School: 7th Grade through 9th Grade

At the new campus in Syosset (formerly home to Our Lady of Mercy Academy), LISG takes up five floors including; various classrooms, office spaces, library and media center, makerspace, gymnasium, auditorium, two cafeterias, and a dance studio/orchestral program room. The grounds include a large spacious area which includes a playground, gazebo, and gaga pit.

== Enrollment ==
The total number of students is approximately 167 as of the 2025/2026 school year.

== Staff ==
There are currently 46 staff members, teachers, and administrators. Patricia Geyer is the current Head of School after Roberta Tropper's retirement at the end of the 2015–2016 school year.

== Notable alumni ==
- Hoodie Allen (rapper)
- Shawn Bayern (law professor and computer scientist)
- Lester Mackey (computer scientist and MacArthur Fellow)
- John Schulman (American artificial intelligence researcher and co-founder of OpenAI)
