= CheddarU =

American closed-circuit television channel

- Country: United States
- Broadcast area: Closed-circuit on American college campuses
- Headquarters: New York City, New York

Programming
- Language: English
- Picture format: 16:9 480i SDTV

Ownership
- Owner: Viacom Media Networks (2002–2018); Cheddar (2018–2024)
- Sister channels: Cheddar

History
- Launched: February 2002; 24 years ago (as College Television Network)
- Replaced: MTVU (college cable television; MTVU remains available as a digital cable network)
- Closed: c. 2024
- Former names: College Television Network (2002–2004); MTVU (2004–2018)

Links
- Website: cheddar.com/cheddaru

CheddarU was an American closed-circuit television network available on U.S. college campuses owned by Cheddar, as part of internally originated cable systems that were a part of on-campus housing or college closed-circuit television systems. In 2018, Cheddar acquired MTV Networks on Campus, a former division of Viacom (now Paramount Skydance), to launch the channel. Cheddar also acquired RateMyProfessors.com, which was part of the MTVU division from 2007, in October 2018.

== History ==
MTV Networks' proposal for a channel targeting college students, tentatively called MTV University, was announced in February 2002. According to The New York Times, the channel was intended to compete with Burly Bear Network, which was available to 450 campuses and had been attracting nearly a million viewers a week, along with recently launched channels College Television Network (CTN) and Zilo.

In September 2002, with CTN having financial problems and National Lampoon's acquisition of Burly Bear, MTV Networks acquired CTN for $15 million. In 2004, CTN was rebranded as MTVU.

In February 2008, MTV Networks discontinued VH1 Uno, a sparsely viewed Spanish language music video channel, and replaced it with MTVU, expanding the channel into traditional cable distribution.

In May 2018, Cheddar acquired Viacom's MTV Networks on Campus; outlets associated with that service were converted to carry CheddarU, a secondary feed which streamed content from the flagship financial-news streaming service and interstitials from Cheddar Big News to nine million students on more than 600 campuses; universities which previously screened MTV Networks on Campus continued to receive CheddarU at no cost in exchange for access to the campus. MTVU continues to be available to linear television platforms. Universities that qualified could receive the CheddarU service for free. CheddarU was part of the ChedNet division of Cheddar, a division that focused to have the service available to public screens such as gyms, club bars, airports, hotels and other public venues. CheddarU launched in over 650 campuses on July 26, 2018, and became available to all campuses by August 1, 2018. In February 2024, it was announced that CheddarU's college network screens were acquired by Trooh Media, and the channel quietly shut down around this time.
