= WPTS-FM =

Coordinates: 40.4442°N 79.9531°W

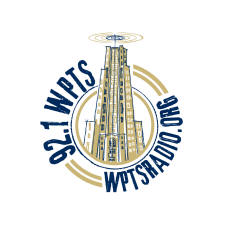
- Pittsburgh, Pennsylvania; United States
- Broadcast area: University of Pittsburgh campus
- Frequency: 92.1 MHz

Programming
- Format: College radio

Ownership
- Owner: University of Pittsburgh

History
- First air date: August 26, 1984
- Call sign meaning: Pittsburgh

Technical information
- Facility ID: 68946
- Class: D
- ERP: 16 watts
- HAAT: 141 metres (463 ft)
- Repeater: 96.9 WRRK-HD4 (Braddock)

Links
- Webcast: Listen live
- Website: wpts.pitt.edu

WPTS-FM (92.1 MHz) is a non-commercial radio station owned by the University of Pittsburgh, and offers a mix of student-run programming, ranging from music programming to news and sports coverage. The station operates with an ERP of 16 watts, and is licensed to Pittsburgh. Its transmitter is located on the top of the university's Cathedral of Learning in Pittsburgh.

== History ==
WPTS-FM originally evolved from WPGH, an AM carrier current station that broadcast to the Pitt Student Union and dormitories. WPGH was started in the fall of 1957 by 12 students, including Adrian Cronauer, whose experiences in Vietnam were made famous by Robin Williams in the movie Good Morning, Vietnam. Since then, WPGH is now the call letters of the Fox TV station in Pittsburgh. The push to get an FM station began in the fall of 1977 when Pitt requested a space on the commercial FM broadcast band. Because the Federal Communications Commission was concerned that the move of WPTS to FM might set an unfavorable precedent for other non-commercial stations seeking to make a similar move, Pitt had to reassure the FCC that WPTS-FM was a unique case. As a result, WPTS-FM was granted a class D license with a radiating power of 10 Watts in the fall of 1984, the last 10-Watt station to be licensed by the FCC. The station was originally on 98.5 until 1994, when it moved to the current frequency.

After a reduction in power to two watts in May 2005 at the request of the FCC, WPTS acquired a new directional antenna in the summer of 2006 to reduce interference with WKPL, a commercial station to the northwest.

In 2009, 2012, 2013, and 2015 WPTS was nominated as one of the five to ten finalists for the mtvU Woodie Award for best college radio station in the United States. WPTS was awarded the Woodie Award in 2015.

In 2018, WPTS placed 2nd in the College Broadcasters, Inc. National Student Production Award for "Best Station Imaging". CBI would award WPTS the first place position for "Best Podcast" in 2020 for the station's Impeachment Podcast, based on the 2019 impeachment proceedings of President Donald J. Trump.

== Promotions ==
WPTS-FM has conducted a variety of promotions. The "Moustache Challenge" was a group collaborative effort created by a number of WPTS-FM station staff in 2006 with the idea to see who might grow the most impressive moustache over the month of November. The idea is based on Jay Della Valle's The Glorious Mustache Challenge and the competition was open to anyone at the University of Pittsburgh. The promotion won the 2007 College Broadcasters, Inc. National Student Production Award for "Best Station Promotion". This contest followed the 2005 "Egg Hunt" contest, which won the 2006 College Broadcasters, Inc. National Student Production Award for "Best Station Promotion".

As part of its promotional efforts, WPTS-FM typically hosts a national touring band in both the fall and spring. Past bands that have played at WPTS-FM include Nirvana, Matt & Kim, Mates of State, Man Man, Cloud Nothings, No Age, Of Montreal, Jens Lekman, Girl Talk, Why?, Real Estate, Woods, Waxahatchee, Someone Still Loves You Boris Yeltsin, and many others.
