= The Soundtrack Channel =

Film and television music cable and satellite channel

- Country: United States
- Broadcast area: United States, Asia-Pacific, Europe
- Headquarters: Santa Monica, California

History
- Launched: March 2002

The Soundtrack Channel (STC) was a 24-hour cable and satellite channel which featured various film and television music. The channel featured music videos and other related programming. STC exclusively featured music videos from movie and television soundtracks, including original movie videos that were produced specifically for the channel. Soundtrack Channel also featured entertainment news, behind-the-scenes specials of the movie-making process and celebrity interviews.

== Operating channels ==
- STC Asia - ^{(JCSAT 3A)}
- STC USA - The lead channel ^{(Echostar 9 (Galaxy 23).)}

- ^{* Satellite details not available.}

- ^{Source: Lyngsat Satellite Site (www.lyngsat.com)}

== Press release ==
- RRSat Chosen by Soundtrack Channel to Launch Services to Asia on Telstar 10 Satellite
