= Christian French (singer) =

American singer-songwriter

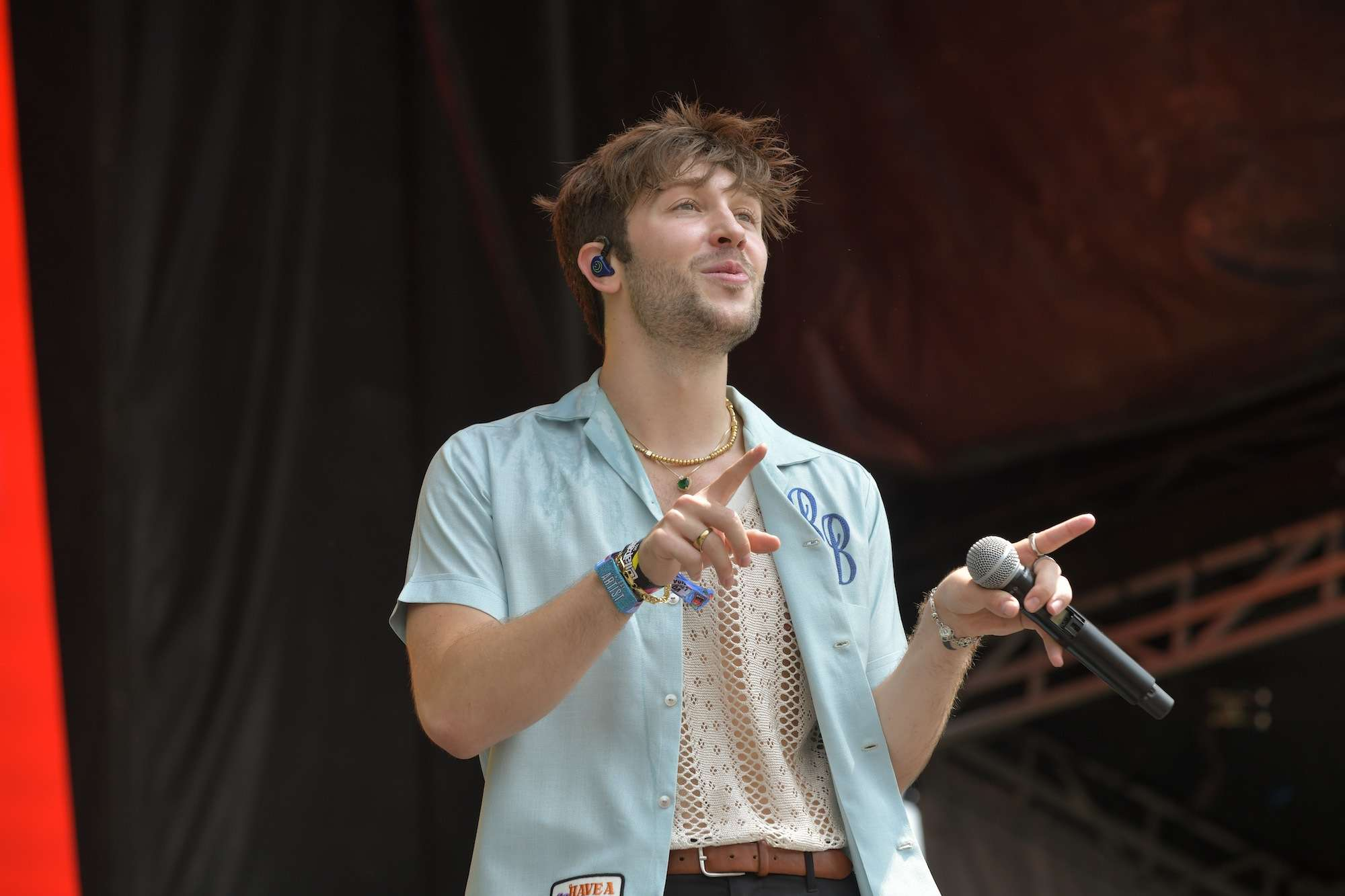
- French performing at Lollapalooza 2021

Background information
- Born: March 17, 1997 (age 29); Fishers, Indiana, U.S.
- Genres: Pop; Indie
- Occupation: Singer-songwriter
- Years active: 2017–present
- Labels: Disruptor; RCA
- Website: christian-french.com

Christian French (born March 17, 1997) is an American pop singer-songwriter based in Los Angeles. He grew up in Fishers, Indiana and learned to play piano by watching YouTube tutorials and in high school started posting song covers on SoundCloud.

== Biography ==
While a pre-med student at Indiana University, he started writing original music. After dropping out of college, he moved to Los Angeles and put out a few singles with producer Triegy, including their first track, "Fall for You", which charted on Spotify's U.S. Viral 50. He followed that with "By Myself", also a collaboration with Triegy, that earned over 50 million Spotify listens.

In 2018, he worked with Grammy-nominated producer Dru Decaro, and released his debut EP, natural colors and the single "Sweet Home". That same year he left college to tour with Chelsea Cutler on her Sleeping with Roses Tour. In 2019, French was a guest on Hoodie Allen's single "Come Around" and toured with Quinn XCII on the From Tour With Love spring tour.

That same year, Christian signed to Disruptor Records/Sony Music and released the 6-track EP bright side of the moon, ruminating on mental health and tales of romance. The single "Head First", produced by Andrew Luce, amassed more than 32 million Spotify spins and 2 million YouTube views. The accompanying video premiered on Billboard on June 18, 2020.

On January 17, 2020, the video for his track "time of our lives" premiered on Ones to Watch. In March 2020, Time magazine named his single, "crowded room", one of its Best New Songs of the Week and it appeared on Spotify's New Music Friday playlist. He followed that up with the single, "i think too much", which was released on April 16, 2020. Two more singles, "make or break up" and "paper thin", released leading up to his third EP, good things take time on September 18, 2020.

French would take a nine-month hiatus before releasing his next single, "Avalanche". Just four days later, he would play at Lollapalooza 2021, his largest show to date. He would then announce "The Avalanche Tour", his first ever headlining tour which would take place throughout the fall of 2021. His following singles, "OH WELL" and "golden years" would release in late 2021 and early 2022 respectively.

French released multiple singles throughout the remainder of 2022, including "butterfly fields", "evergreen", and "karma". His rendition of The Anxiety's "Meet Me At Our Spot" was popular on TikTok throughout 2022, and he released it on streaming platforms in late 2022. Throughout the release of these singles, French headlines his second tour, "The Golden Years Tour".

In 2023, French continued to release more singles, such as "thank god", "lonely", "bring u down", and the Tana Mongeau-aimed "trigger warning". He also announced his third headlining tour, "The Space Between Tour". This tour was named after his EP The Space Between, which released on September 1, 2023.

== Personal life ==
Growing up, French was an avid hockey player. French played for local Indianapolis travel teams for much of his youth. During the 2013–2014 season, French was the captain of the Indiana Jr. Ice U16 AAA team that featured Logan Brown who was selected in the 2016 NHL entry draft 11th overall by the Ottawa Senators. In his three years at Indiana University, French would play for the Indiana University hockey team each year.

== Discography ==
EPs
Title	Details
Natural Colors	Released: December 20, 2018; Label: Disruptor Records/RCA Records; Formats: Digital Download, Streaming
bright side of the moon	Released: August 9, 2019; Label: Disruptor Records/RCA Records; Formats: Digital Download, Streaming
head first (remixes)	Released: July 3, 2020; Label: Disruptor Records/RCA Records; Formats: Digital Download, Streaming
good things take time	Released: September 18, 2020; Label: Disruptor Records/RCA Records; Formats: Digital Download, Streaming
The Space Between	Released: September 1, 2023; Label: Disruptor Records/RCA Records; Formats: Digital Download, Streaming

Singles
Title	Details
"Fall for You" (with Triegy)	Released: October 24, 2016; Label: Disruptor Records/RCA Records; Formats: Digital Download, Streaming
"Dying Alive" (with Triegy)	Released: January 6, 2017; Label: Disruptor Records/RCA Records; Formats: Digital Download, Streaming
"By Myself" (with Triegy)	Released: May 2016, 2017; Label: Disruptor Records/RCA Records; Formats: Digital Download, Streaming
"Done from the Start" (with Triegy)	Released: August 31, 2017; Label: Disruptor Records/RCA Records; Formats: Digital Download, Streaming
"love ride"	Released: November 16, 2017; Label: Disruptor Records/RCA Records; Formats: Digital Download, Streaming
"Superstars"	Released: June 1, 2018; Label: Disruptor Records/RCA Records; Formats: Digital Download, Streaming
"Sweet Home"	Released: August 1, 2018; Label: Disruptor Records/RCA Records; Formats: Digital Download, Streaming
"Hearts of Gold" (with MILES)	Released: October 24, 2018; Label: Disruptor Records/RCA Records; Formats: Digital Download, Streaming
"heavy snow"	Released: March 15, 2019; Label: Disruptor Records/RCA Records; Formats: Digital Download, Streaming
"breaking all the rules"	Released: April 19, 2019; Label: Disruptor Records/RCA Records; Formats: Digital Download, Streaming
"head first"	Released: May 17, 2019; Label: Disruptor Records/RCA Records; Formats: Digital Download, Streaming
"Come Around" (with Hoodie Allen)	Released: June 21, 2019; Label: Disruptor Records/RCA Records; Formats: Digital Download, Streaming
"hungover sunday"	Released: July 12, 2019; Label: Disruptor Records/RCA Records; Formats: Digital Download, Streaming
"time of our lives"	Released: January 17, 2020; Label: Disruptor Records/RCA Records; Formats: Digital Download, Streaming
"crowded room"	Released: March 6, 2020; Label: Disruptor Records/RCA Records; Formats: Digital Download, Streaming
"i think too much"	Released: April 17, 2020; Label: Disruptor Records/RCA Records; Formats: Digital Download, Streaming
"make or break up"	Released: July 10, 2020; Label: Disruptor Records/RCA Records; Formats: Digital Download, Streaming
"paper thin"	Released: August 7, 2020; Label: Disruptor Records/RCA Records; Formats: Digital Download, Streaming
"avalanche"	Released: June 25, 2021; Label: Disruptor Records/RCA Records; Formats: Digital Download, Streaming
"OH WELL"	Released: November 12, 2021; Label: Disruptor Records/RCA Records; Formats: Digital Download, Streaming
"golden years"	Released: May 26, 2022; Label: Disruptor Records/RCA Records; Formats: Digital Download, Streaming
"butterfly fields"	Released: August 4, 2022; Label: Disruptor Records/RCA Records; Formats: Digital Download, Streaming
"evergreen"	Released: September 22, 2022; Label: Disruptor Records/RCA Records; Formats: Digital Download, Streaming
"karma"	Released: October 27, 2022; Label: Disruptor Records/RCA Records; Formats: Digital Download, Streaming
"Meet Me At Our Spot"	Released: November 17, 2022; Label: Disruptor Records/RCA Records; Formats: Digital Download, Streaming
"thank god"	Released: February 16, 2023; Label: Disruptor Records/RCA Records; Formats: Digital Download, Streaming
"lonely"	Released: March 23, 2023; Label: Disruptor Records/RCA Records; Formats: Digital Download, Streaming
"bring u down"	Released: June 1, 2023; Label: Disruptor Records/RCA Records; Formats: Digital Download, Streaming
"trigger warning"	Released: July 27, 2023; Label: Disruptor Records/RCA Records; Formats: Digital Download, Streaming

=== Remixes ===
- "head first (HALP remix)" - 2020
- "head first (Pink Slip x inverness remix)" - 2020
- "head first (Young Bombs remix)" - 2020
