= WASU-FM =

- Boone, North Carolina; United States
- Frequency: 90.5 MHz
- Branding: WASU-FM The App

Programming
- Format: Alternative rock
- Affiliations: Appalachian State University

Ownership
- Owner: Appalachian State University

History
- First air date: 1972
- Call sign meaning: Appalachian State University

Technical information
- Licensing authority: FCC
- Facility ID: 2467
- Class: A
- ERP: 220 watts
- HAAT: 29.7 meters
- Transmitter coordinates: 36°13′59.00″N 81°41′55.00″W

Links
- Public license information: Public file; LMS
- Webcast: Listen live
- Website: wasuradio.com

WASU-FM (90.5 FM) is a college radio station broadcasting an alternative rock format. The station is owned by Appalachian State University in Boone, North Carolina, the station's city of license. Their transmitter sits atop Rich Mountain in Watauga county.

The station plays college rock and does a weekly news segment called App 1800 covering local issues. WASU is the winner of mtvU's "College Radio Woodie Award" for 2012, the "Shoulda Coulda Woodie Award" for 2011, and was a 2008 Finalist in the New York Festivals Radio Broadcasting Awards.

== History ==
1972: Signed on with the first song being Beginnings by Chicago.

1978: Moves to Wey Hall.

2013: WASU begins broadcasting from the new George G. Beasley Media Complex with the song "I Will Wait" by Mumford & Sons. The last song played from Wey Hall is "Start Me Up" by The Rolling Stones.

== Specialty shows ==
WASU has a variety of specialty shows that happen after 6pm. These shows allow for genres and shows that students produce to get on-air.

== Sports ==
WASU operates a sports department that offers interested students opportunities to gain experience in the field of sports broadcasting.

Members of the sports team host an hour-long sports talk show called SportsWrAPP that airs live on Tuesdays and Thursdays during the school year.

Students also have opportunities to broadcast sporting events for App State Athletics. Broadcast roles for games include play-by-play commentator, color commentator, sideline reporter (football and basketball only) and board operator/studio host. All home football, men's basketball and select baseball games are broadcast over-the-air on 90.5 FM in Boone, as well as the online live stream on WASU's website. Other sporting events, such as women's basketball, women's volleyball and select baseball games not aired on the station are instead broadcast over audio only streams on Twitch or YouTube.

The department also has a partnership with Lees-McRae College in nearby Banner Elk, North Carolina. This partnership gives students the opportunity to commentate home sporting events for Lees-McRae Athletics on the Conference Carolinas Digital Network streaming platform.

== Notable alumni ==
Stephen Dubner - Author, journalist and podcast host

== See also ==
- Campus radio
- List of college radio stations in the United States
