= Roofless Records =

American independent record label

Roofless Records is an independent record label, producer and publisher based in Miami, FL. Roofless Records focuses predominantly on experimental music by Florida artists. All music is released as limited-edition vinyl records or cassette tapes. In an interview with the Miami New Times, Roofless Records co-founder Matt Preira says, "We deal in the business of objects and moments." Roofless Records is a finalist in the 2011 Knight Arts Challenge Miami grant competition, funded by the John S. and James L. Knight Foundation to support emerging artists and arts organizations.

== History ==
Roofless Records was founded in 2007 by Dana Bassett and Matt Preira. Bassett and Preira met and began the project as undergraduate students at the New College of Florida in Sarasota, FL. On naming the label, Preira explains, “It rolls off the tongue, and I appreciated the cognitive dissonance inspired by a house with a roof that says ‘Roofless’ under it. I also appreciated the resonance with Magritte's This Is Not A Pipe painting, plus Eazy-E ran Ruthless Records (pronounced Roofless).”

== Material Releases ==
=== Record Releases ===
1. The Fas'ners / The Wurst – Live @ Sarasota Succulent Society CS
2. Skeleton Warrior / Pharaoh Faucett – Skeleton Warrior / Pharaoh Faucett (Split 7")
3. Various artists – Over/Bored (Compilation LP)
4. Skeleton Warrior / Preaux Breaux Geauxld – Skeleton Warrior / Preaux Breaux Geauxld (Split 7")
5. MLU / The New Flesh – MLU / The New Flesh (Split LP)
6. The President – LeBron Delux CD-R
7. The President – EXPERIENCE SOBRIETY Delux CD-R (44 page booklet)
8. Slashpine – Slashpine (7")

=== Cassette Releases ===
1. Curious Hair – HAIR DOES HUMBERT
2. Flux Forces – wetdream

=== Publications ===
1. Lazaro Rodriguez – I Swear

== Series Events and Collaborations ==
- Anti-Art Becomes At – Art Babble (with Rat Bastard)
- Cinema Sounds (with Borscht Film Festival)
- Sweatstock (with Sweat Records)
- Strange Days (with Sweat Records)
- Miami Micro-Show (with the End/SPRING BREAK)

== Affiliated Venues (Miami, FL) ==
- Bas Fischer Invitational
- Churchills Pub
- La Cueva
- The Guest Lab
- Harvey's By The Bay / The American Legion
- Little River Yacht Club
- O Cinema
- Sweat Records
