= Hotel of the Laughing Tree =

American indie rock band

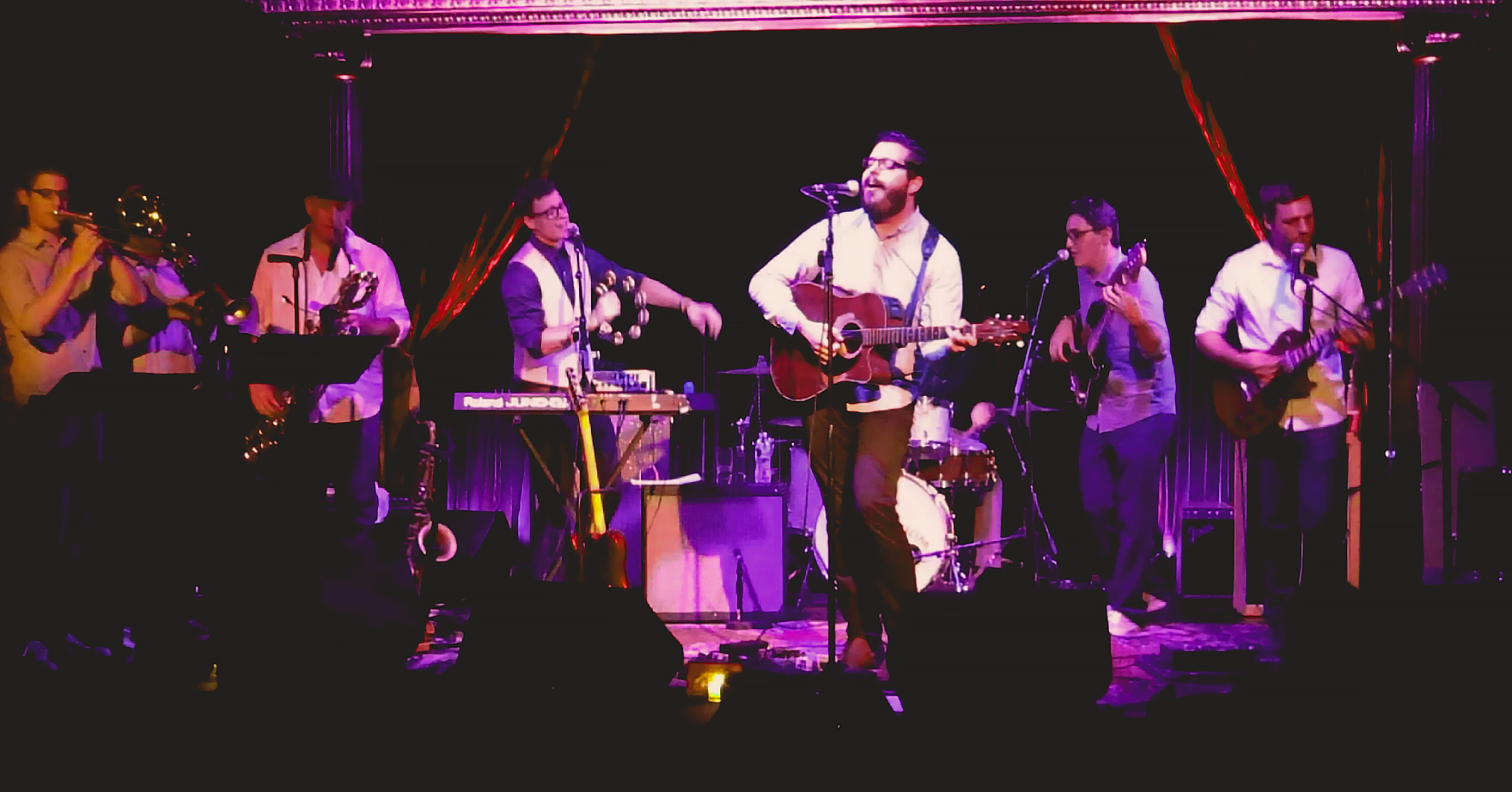

Background information
- Origin: Long Island, New York
- Genres: Indie
- Years active: 2009–present
- Spinoffs: Cloud Caverns, AJ Estrada
- Members: AJ Estrada, Brandon Peterson, Jonathon Streker, Neil Scalesse

Hotel of the Laughing Tree is an indie rock band that was formed in 2009 on Long Island. The band presently consists of AJ Estrada, Brandon Peterson, Neil Scalesse and Jonathon Streker, and now reside in their respective states of New York, Tennessee and Massachusetts, working digitally to create new records.

== Biography ==
After the dissolution of the progressive rock band Rendezvous with the Kidnappers, multi-instrumentalist and songwriter AJ Estrada began to put together a new project with a distinctive Indie/Pop sound. Hotel's members developed into the original lineup of Estrada on guitar and lead vocals, Brandon Peterson on lead guitar and harmony vocals, Anthony Arma on bass, and a combination of Neil Scalesse and Mike Nixdorf on drums and other percussion instruments. They would later be joined by keyboardist Mike Solomon in 2010.

Hotel released their debut EP "Old Dominion" in August 2009. Upon its release, it garnered a very positive review from the popular alternative music site AbsolutePunk, receiving praise for its songs' diversity in sound and catchy hooks.

While continuing to play shows in and around the Long Island area, Hotel entered the 6th Annual mtvU Woodie Awards in the category "Best Music on Campus". After making it to the top two, they defeated their opponent Oh, The Story! and accepted the award in New York City on November 18, 2009. They were then featured in Alternative Press Magazine as the Unsigned Band of the Week for January 29, 2010.

Hotel released their first full-length album, entitled "Terror and Everything After", on February 1, 2011 and the band led a supporting tour of the album shortly after.

Arma, Scalesse, and Nixdorf parted ways with the band in June 2011 with former members of the recently dissolved Tiger Riot, Fred and Dan Ardis, taking on drum and bass duties, respectively.

In November 2012, Hotel released the EP "Mammoth Skin Pt. 1," for free digital download. This was followed up with "Mammoth Skin Pt. 2" in April 2014.

Their second full-length album, "New World Sundown", was released independently on February 1, 2015.

The band next released "Hotel Junk Box" in 2017, a collection of B-Sides and rarities.

== Members ==
- AJ Estrada (lead vocals, guitar, arrangements and production)
- Brandon Peterson (harmony vocals, guitar, production)
- Jonathon Streker (harmony vocals, piano and keys)
- Neil Scalesse (drums, percussion, bass, production)

== Former members ==
- Fred Ardis (drums, percussion)
- Dan Ardis (bass guitar)
- Mike Nixdorf (percussion, glockenspiel)
- Anthony Arma (bass)
- Mike Solomon (keys, vocals)
- Cory Meyers (bass, Co-Founder)
- Kyle Schnitzer (pianist, vocalist)

== Discography ==
Albums
Old Dominion (2009)
Terror and Everything After (2011)
Mammoth Skin Pt. 1 (2012)
Mammoth Skin Pt. 2 (2014)
New World Sundown (2015)
Hotel Junk Box (2017)
Faraway Friends (2023)
A Mountain Fastness (2025)

Singles
Bad Canterbury
Barnaby Bison's Blind
Son of the Iron Sheep

== Awards ==
=== mtvU Woodie Awards ===
The mtvU Woodie Awards is an annual awards show sponsored by mtvU, a division of MTV Networks. Hotel of the Laughing Tree received the 2009 "Best Music on Campus" award.

Year	Nominee / work	Award	Result
2009	Hotel of the Laughing Tree	Best Music on Campus Woodie	Won
