= KUPS =

Coordinates: 47.263°N 122.478°W

- Tacoma, Washington; United States
- Frequency: 90.1 MHz
- Branding: 90.1 The Sound

Programming
- Format: Freeform

Ownership
- Owner: University of Puget Sound

History
- First air date: 1968
- Call sign meaning: University of Puget Sound

Technical information
- Licensing authority: FCC
- Facility ID: 68996
- Class: A
- ERP: 100 watts
- HAAT: 70 meters (230 ft)

Links
- Public license information: Public file; LMS
- Website: kups.fm

KUPS (90.1 FM) is a non-commercial college radio station licensed to Tacoma, Washington, United States. KUPS began operations in 1968 as an experiment in closed-circuit AM broadcasting. At that time, the station was available only in buildings on the campus of the University of Puget Sound.

KUPS broadcasts 24 hours a day, 7 days a week to the greater Tacoma area on 90.1 FM and to the rest of the world online. The station is administered by the Associated Students of the University of Puget Sound, and is run by over 120 student volunteers and paid staff members. KUPS features many shows, such as Milo Hensley and Hayden Smith's "Middle School Sleepover" blanketing many genres, including: Alternative, Loud Rock, Hip-Hop, Electronic, and Jazz programs with listeners in the Tacoma, Washington area. KUPS has earned national accolades, and frequently appears on The Princeton Review Best College Radio Station list, placing #5 in 2023.

== History ==
Additional information on the 1968 Carrier Current station for KUPS can be found at www.engineer-exchange.com

In 1975, KUPS moved from being a carrier current AM station to a 10 Watt FM station.

In 1983, the Federal Communications Commission (FCC) declared that the minimum operating power for a station be at least 100 Watts. KUPS increased its output to 100 Watts.

In 1999, KUPS began streaming its programming on the internet through a third party website.

In 2001, the KUPS studios were remodeled. The studios are located in Wheelock Student Center on the University of Puget Sound campus.

In 2002, KUPS started streaming its programming on the internet via its website, .

== Awards ==
In 2004, KUPS DJ David Conger was recognized by Collegiate Broadcasters Inc. (CBI) as one of the nations best DJ's as one of four finalists in the Best DJ category of the 2004 CBI National Production Awards.

In 2005, KUPS was named by The Princeton Review as one of the best college radio stations in the country (#12). Then-music director China Bialos was nominated as Music Director of the Year by CMJ. KUPS was nominated as the station with the Biggest Improvement in 2005 by CMJ. When nominated for the Biggest Improvement award, station was under the leadership of Chief of Operations: Adam Gehrke, General Manager: Jean Gibb, Programming Director: David Conger, with Music Directors China Bialos, Aub Driver, Jason Miller, Blaire Notrica and John Dugan, and Promotions Director: Brenden Goetz and Production Director: Brian Coleman.

In 2007, KUPS was recognized by the Princeton Review in the Top Ten Best College Radio Stations in the Country, ranked number 9. Additionally in 2007, KUPS music director Kathleen Perez was nominated for the Most Honest Feedback award by CMJ.

In 2009, KUPS won the Woodie Award for best college radio station in the country, a contest organized by the Princeton Review, and CMJ, based on thousands of online votes and record label feedback. The award was bestowed upon KUPS by mtvU and broadcast on mtvU, MTV, MTV2, and Palladia.

In 2011, KUPS was recognized by The Washington Post as 3rd in a list of "10 great college radio stations."

In 2023, KUPS was recognized by The Princeton Review as the 5th best college radio station in the country, moving up from 12th in the 2005, 9th in 2007, and 8th in 2011.
