= WESS =

Radio station at East Stroudsburg University

- East Stroudsburg, Pennsylvania; United States
- Broadcast area: Monroe County, Pennsylvania
- Frequency: 90.3 MHz

Programming
- Format: College radio
- Affiliations: BBC World Service; Public Radio Exchange

Ownership
- Owner: East Stroudsburg University

History
- Call sign meaning: East Stroudsburg State

Technical information
- Licensing authority: FCC
- Facility ID: 18247
- Class: A
- ERP: 1,000 watts
- HAAT: -37.0 meters
- Transmitter coordinates: 40°59′50.00″N 75°10′22.00″W

Links
- Public license information: Public file; LMS
- Webcast: Listen live (via TuneIn)
- Website: www.esu.edu/wess%20esu.edu/wess

WESS is a student operated, non-commercial, FCC-licensed college radio station that is located on the campus of East Stroudsburg University in East Stroudsburg, Pennsylvania.

== Description ==
The station has a diversified music format, which gives listeners and deejays more variety and freedom. The station also offers talk shows. Listeners call in and voice their opinions on topics discussed on the show.

WESS also broadcasts the ESU Warrior's home football, basketball, and Baseball games all year long with play by play from our Sports Director and his or her sports crew.

Students at ESU can listen in by tuning their radio dials to FM frequency 90.3, as well as tuning to Channel 14 or 15 on Cable TV in the dorms, or by listening online.

Although the station is on-campus, its 1,000 watt signal spreads out over a 15-30-mile radius in the Poconos and parts of northwestern New Jersey.

The purpose of WESS is to provide a means of student training and experience in radio broadcasting, and to provide East Stroudsburg University and the surrounding communities with alternative entertainment and educational programming.

WESS won the MTV Woodie Award in 2014 for Best College Radio Station.
