= VH1 Uno =

- Broadcast area: United States

Programming
- Picture format: 480i SDTV

Ownership
- Owner: MTV Networks
- Sister channels: VH1, VH1 Classic, CMT Music, BET Soul

History
- Launched: 2000; 26 years ago
- Closed: February 2, 2008; 18 years ago
- Replaced by: MTVU

VH1 Uno (or VHUno in some promotional materials and TV listings) was an American television channel transmitting via digital cable and satellite that was a sister channel of VH1. It featured a mix of Latin pop and ballads, tropical, salsa, merengue, tejano, Latin soul, reggaeton and urban hip hop, featuring top artists such Marc Anthony, Jennifer Lopez, Celia Cruz, Shakira and Luis Miguel.

As with Country Music Television's digital sister network CMT Pure Country (formerly VH1 Country), VH1 Uno could be thought of as an all-music video version of MTV Tr3s.

On February 2, 2008, the channel was discontinued by what was then MTV Networks to expand distribution of the college-focused cable channel MTVU into normal cable homes.
