= All About It =

Single by Hoodie Allen featuring Ed Sheeran

from the album People Keep Talking
- Released: October 13, 2014
- Recorded: 2014
- Genre: Hip hop
- Length: 3:25
- Label: Hoodie Allen LLC
- Songwriters: Ed Sheeran; Parrish Warrington; RJ Ferguson; Steven Markowitz
- Producers: RJ Ferguson; Parrish Warrington

Hoodie Allen singles chronology
"Dumb for You" (2014)	"All About It" (2014)	"Let It All Work Out" (2015)

Ed Sheeran singles chronology
"Thinking Out Loud" (2014)	"All About It" (2014)	"Make It Rain" (2014)

Music video
- "All About It" on YouTube

"All About It" is a hip-hop song by American rapper Hoodie Allen. It features vocals from Ed Sheeran. The song was recorded for Allen's first album, People Keep Talking (2014). On October 13, 2014, it became available on streaming and downloading services.

== Charts ==
Chart (2014–15)	Peak position
Austria (Ö3 Austria Top 40)	10
Belgium (Ultratip Bubbling Under Flanders)	8
Belgium (Ultratip Bubbling Under Wallonia)	4
Germany (GfK)	9
New Zealand (Recorded Music NZ)	30
Slovenia (SloTop50)	30
Switzerland (Schweizer Hitparade)	34
US Billboard Hot 100	71
US Hot Rap Songs (Billboard)	13
US Pop Airplay (Billboard)	28
US Rhythmic Airplay (Billboard)	29

== Certifications ==
Region	Certification	Certified units/sales
United States (RIAA)	Gold	500,000^{‡}
^{‡} Sales+streaming figures based on certification alone.

== Release history ==
Country	Date	Format	Label
Austria, Germany, Switzerland	March 6, 2015	Digital download	Hoodie Allen LLC
