= Hoodie Allen =

American rapper, singer and songwriter from New York

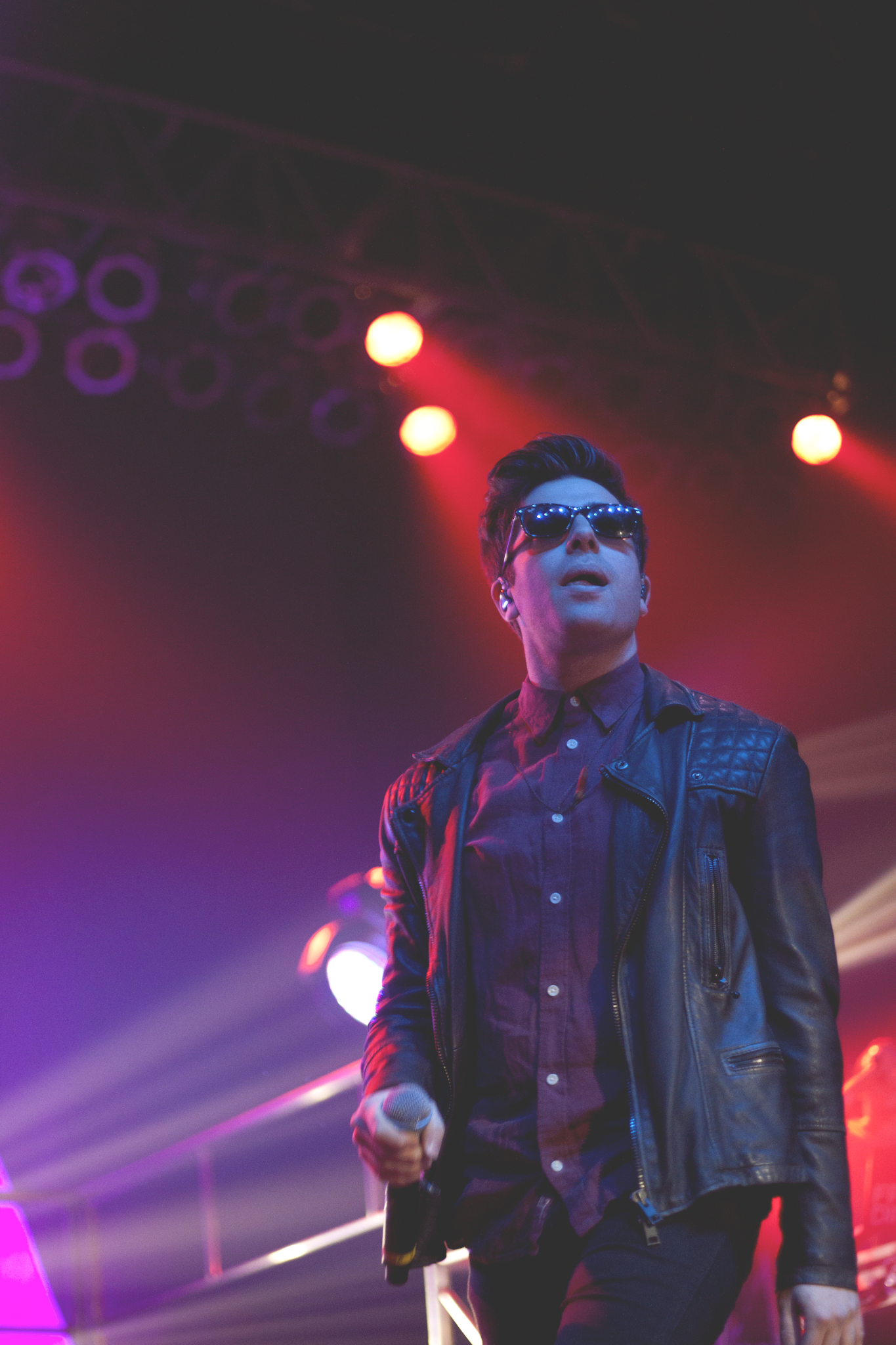
- Hoodie Allen performing at Roseland Ballroom in 2013

Background information
- Born: Steven Adam Markowitz; August 19, 1988 (age 38); Plainview, New York, U.S.
- Genres: Hip-hop; alternative hip-hop; pop rap; frat rap
- Occupations: Rapper; songwriter
- Years active: 2009–present
- Website: www.hoodieallen.com

Steven Adam Markowitz (born August 19, 1988), known professionally as Hoodie Allen, is an American rapper. After graduating from the University of Pennsylvania, he began working at Google before ultimately quitting to pursue a full-time career in hip-hop.

His debut extended play (EP), All American (2012), peaked at number ten on the Billboard 200. His debut studio album People Keep Talking (2014), peaked at number eight and spawned the single "All About It" (featuring Ed Sheeran), his sole entry on the Billboard Hot 100. His second album, Happy Camper (2016), peaked at number 26 on the Billboard 200, while his third, The Hype (2017), narrowly entered the chart.

He is regarded as a preeminent artist in frat rap, a subgenre of hip-hop lyrically centered around coming of age hedonism. Markowitz has remained an independent artist throughout his career.

== Early life ==
Steven Markowitz was born on Long Island and raised in a Jewish household in Plainview along with his brother, Daniel. He started writing lyrics as a child, and would perform raps for his friends at house parties. Markowitz first attended the Long Island School for the Gifted in South Huntington, and later attended Plainview – Old Bethpage John F. Kennedy High School.

While attending the University of Pennsylvania, he pledged the Alpha Epsilon Pi fraternity. He also played as defensive back for Penn's sprint football team. After graduating in 2010 with a degree in marketing and finance, he worked at Google as an AdWords associate in their Standardized AdWords Reseller Training (START) program. He would leave at 7:00 am for a bus ride to the Googleplex in Mountain View, work a full day at Google, return home at 6:00 pm, write songs, answer fan emails, and schedule concerts until 2:00 or 3:00 AM. Reflecting on this, Allen said, "I was moving so fast, and even while I was at Google there was so much going on that I felt like I was doing two full-time jobs." His dream and passion was music, so when he got opportunities to do live shows, he decided to leave the company.

== Career ==
=== 2009–12: Beginnings and Leap Year ===
Hoodie Allen originally was the duo of Steve Markowitz and Obey City (Samuel Obey, a childhood friend) on vocals and production, respectively. The group's name is combination of Markowitz's childhood nickname of "Hoodie" and filmmaker Woody Allen; Markowitz later said he wanted a name which "would stick in peoples' minds and be a little bit funny and representative of who I am". Steven and Obey's first two releases were the Bagels & Beats EP and Making Waves mixtape. These earned Hoodie a nomination for MTVU's Best Music on Campus Award in 2009. The single "UPENN Girls" also received notable attention. However, in 2010 Obey City ceased to produce in Hoodie for unknown reasons, and Steven continued making music with RJ Ferguson (aka RJF), giving himself the name Hoodie Allen. In June 2010, he released "You Are Not a Robot," which sampled "I Am Not a Robot" by Marina and the Diamonds and which hit No. 1 on Hype Machine, an aggregator that collects the most-blogged about music in the world. After seeing the response, he spent the summer working, and finished his mixtape Pep Rally by September. The album was largely produced by RJF, and sampled songs from Death Cab for Cutie, Flight Facilities, Marina and the Diamonds, Ellie Goulding, and Two Door Cinema Club. He picked the name "Pep Rally" because he said that it "captured the energy of the record" and something "new and exciting." He self-financed a video for the lead single "You Are Not A Robot," which helped the mixtape get downloaded over 200,000 times.

In July 2011, Hoodie released his third mixtape, Leap Year. It reached 250,000 SoundCloud plays in its first week of release. In support of the album, Hoodie headlined a 15-city tour across North America, including stops in San Francisco, New York City, and Montreal, with supporting act Fortune Family opening on several venues. Previously, he had toured with The Cataracs, Das Racist, Chiddy Bang, Mike Posner, and RJD2.

=== 2012: All American ===
On March 4, 2012, Hoodie announced via Twitter that he would be releasing his first EP, titled All American. He decided on this title because he credited his rise to the American Dream, because he felt the songs showcased his best music to date, and because of a hometown restaurant with the same title. Hoodie spent five months developing the album, building tracks from scratch with his producer, RJF, rather than using sampled beats. Regarding the writing process, Hoodie stated that, "I would describe it as liberating... It was like, 'Okay, I hear this idea in my head, I hear these original ideas, [and] I'm putting them and piecing them together.'" On March 29, 2012, Hoodie released the first single from All American entitled "No Interruption," as well as its music video. The music video for his second single on All American, titled "No Faith In Brooklyn (feat. Jhameel)," was released on April 9. All American was released on April 10, 2012, and debuted as the No. 1 album on iTunes and at No. 10 on the Billboard 200. Over the months of April and May, Hoodie made a 22-stop tour across the US in support of All American, featuring rapper Wax, Jared Evan, and others varied from show to show. The I Work Better In The UK Tour was his first time performing overseas. The Excellent Adventure Tour, which featured G-Eazy, began on September 7, 2012.

=== 2013: Crew Cuts and Americoustic ===
On February 11, 2013, XXL premiered the music video for "Cake Boy," the first single off of Hoodie's upcoming mixtape. The single was later released on iTunes for purchase. A week later, the music video for "Fame Is For Assholes" (abbreviated FIFA) premiered on YouTube, which featured rapper Chiddy Bang. Hoodie commented, "I wanted to write a track that mixed a classic doo-wop vibe with the more upbeat hip-hop style that my fans have come to love."

Hoodie embarked on his Cruisin' USA Tour with Aer and Jared Evan which began on March 5, 2013. G-Eazy, instead of Aer, accompanied Hoodie on his Boston, Philly, and NYC shows. During the Cruisin' USA Tour, Hoodie directed the audience to chant that they wanted to see him on Late Night with Jimmy Fallon. Leading up to Roseland Ballroom, Hoodie started the hashtag "#GetHoodieAllenOnFallon" on Twitter to rally his fans. After trending worldwide, Fallon asked to speak with Hoodie.

Hoodie performed his new single "Make It Home" on Fuse alongside Kina Grannis which was released on April 30. The studio version of the single was released onto iTunes on May 15, 2013, where it reached the top ten of the iTunes Hip-Hop/Rap charts.

On July 30, 2013, Hoodie released the music video for "No Interruption (Acoustic)". His acoustic EP Americoustic was released on August 13, 2013, and reached No. 1 on the iTunes Hip-Hop/Rap album chart and No. 4 on the iTunes overall albums chart. The EP's guitar work was composed, recorded and produced by Our Last Night guitarist Matt Wentworth.

=== 2014: People Keep Talking ===
The lead single off of Hoodie's debut studio album, People Keep Talking, was released on May 7, 2014, titled "Show Me What You're Made Of." It premiered along with its music video, which parodied the film Happy Gilmore, and featured fellow rapper D-WHY and Tommy Lee from Mötley Crüe. The single was made available for purchase on iTunes and debuted as the No. 2 song overall. The commercial success of People Keep Talking is considered a development in the mainstreaming of frat rap.

Hoodie then made his television debut on Good Day Philadelphia playing an acoustic version of "Show Me What You're Made Of" after a short interview on May 15.

To promote the album, Hoodie went on a world tour titled People Keeping Talking World Tour, this included shows in the US, Europe, Canada, and Australia, featuring artists Chiddy Bang and MAX. The tour began on October 29, 2014, at the Royal Oak Music Theater in Royal Oak, Michigan, and ran into June 2015.

After tweeting to bassist Pete Wentz about touring together, it was announced that Hoodie would be a special guest on the Boys of Zummer Tour with co-headliners Fall Out Boy and Wiz Khalifa.

=== 2016–2017: Happy Camper and The Hype ===
On January 22, 2016, Hoodie released his second studio album, Happy Camper. Leading up to its release, the eighth track, "Champagne and Pools" (featuring blackbear and KYLE), and the album's lead single, "Are U Having Any Fun?" (featuring Meghan Tonjes), were released. The lead single was also accompanied by its music video which followed the style of a video game similar to Grand Theft Auto V. Happy Camper was also made available for download on iTunes peaking at No. 2 on the overall albums chart.

On September 29, 2017, he released his third studio album, The Hype.

=== 2019: Whatever USA ===
On August 16, 2019, Hoodie released his fourth studio album Whatever USA.

Leading up to its release, the ninth track "Never Going Back" was released on March 1, 2019. He then released "Come Around“, the second single on the album, with Christian French on June 21, 2019. The third track released before the album released was "Hell of a Time" which was released on August 2, 2019.

=== 2020: Allegations of Sexual Misconduct ===
In 2020, Sarah Flores accused Hoodie Allen of grooming and sexual misconduct. Other women came forward after. Hoodie replied later on Twitter saying he had fired a band member.

Sarah followed up in 2023 on TikTok sharing screenshots of her experiences with Hoodie and band members, as well as other fans who reached out privately sharing similar stories.

=== 2023: Return to music and bub ===
After a three year hiatus, Hoodie returned to music by releasing "Wouldn't That Be Nice", on May 13, 2022. This would later be used as the lead single for his upcoming album named bub.

On March 17, 2023, Hoodie released his fifth album named bub.

== Acting career ==
Hoodie has appeared in four episodes of the CollegeHumor series Jake and Amir since March 3, 2011. He made his CollegeHumor debut as Amir's rap teacher in "Jake and Amir / Rap Teacher (With Hoodie Allen)" and returned to that role three more times in videos titled "Jake and Amir / Rap Teacher 2 (with Hoodie Allen)", "Jake and Amir / Rap Teacher 3 (with Hoodie Allen)", and "Jake and Amir / Jake and Amir Finale Part 5: The Auditions".

== Reception ==
In July 2011, Hoodie cracked the Top 10 of Billboard's Uncharted Territory. For the week of August 5, 2011, he was No. 2 on Billboard's Uncharted Territory, with Billboard noting that his "growing popularity is undeniable."

On April 10, 2012, Hoodie's All American EP went to No. 1 on the iTunes charts within hours of its release. All American also debuted at No. 10 on Billboard's Top Albums and was featured on its hip-hop and R&B column, The Juice.

== Discography ==
=== Studio albums ===
List of albums, with selected chart positions
Title	Details	Peak chart positions						
Title	Details	US	US R&B/HH	US Rap	US Ind.	CAN	GER	SWI
People Keep Talking	Released: October 14, 2014; Label: Self-released; Format: CD, digital download	8	2	2	—	24	65	68
Happy Camper	Released: January 22, 2016; Label: Self-released; Format: CD, Digital download	28	2	1	1	55	—	—
The Hype	Released: September 29, 2017; Label: Self-released; Format: CD, LP, digital download	166	—	—	15	—	—	—
Whatever USA	Released: August 16, 2019; Label: Self-released; Format: Digital download, streaming	—	—	—	10	—	—	—
Bub	Released: March 17, 2023; Label: Self-released; Formats: CD, Digital download	—	—	—	—	—	—	—
"—" denotes a title that did not chart, or was not released in that territory.

=== Extended plays ===
Title	Details	Peak chart positions					
Title	Details	US	US R&B/HH	US Rap	US Ind.	CAN	UK
The Bagels And Beats EP	Released: March 10, 2009; Label: Self-released; Formats: Digital download	—	—	—	—	—	—
All American	Released: April 10, 2012; Label: Self-released; Formats: Digital download	10	3	2	3	18	64
Americoustic	Released: August 13, 2013; Label: Self-released; Formats: Digital download	28	—	4	5	—	—
All About It EP	Alternative European release to People Keep Talking; Released: October 14, 2014; Label: Self-released; Formats: Digital download	—	—	—	—	—	—
Buddy System EP	Released: September 20, 2024; Label: Self-released; Formats: Digital download	—	—	—	—	—	—
"—" denotes a title that did not chart, or was not released in that territory.

=== Mixtapes ===
List of mixtapes
Title	Album details
Making Waves	Released: October 21, 2009; Label: Self-released; Formats: Digital download
Pep Rally	Released: September 21, 2010; Label: Self-released; Formats: Digital download
Leap Year	Released: July 26, 2011; Label: Self-released; Formats: Digital download
Crew Cuts	Released: February 20, 2013; Label: Self-released; Formats: Digital download

=== Singles ===
==== As lead artist ====
List of singles as lead artist, with selected chart positions, showing year released and album name
Title	Year	Peak chart positions							Certifications	Album
Title	Year	US	US R&B/ HH	US Rap	AUT	GER	NZ	SWI	Certifications	Album
"You Are Not a Robot"	2010	—	—	—	—	—	—	—		Pep Rally
"No Interruption"	2012	—	—	—	—	—	—	—	RIAA: Platinum	All American
"No Faith In Brooklyn" (featuring Jhameel)	2012	—	—	—	—	—	—	—	RIAA: Gold	All American
"Cake Boy"	2013	—	—	—	—	—	—	—		Crew Cuts
"Fame Is for Assholes" (featuring Chiddy)	2013	—	—	—	—	—	—	—		Crew Cuts
"Make It Home" (featuring Kina Grannis)	2013	—	—	—	—	—	—	—		Non-album single
"No Interruption (Acoustic)"	2013	—	—	—	—	—	—	—		Americoustic
"Show Me What You're Made Of"	2014	—	—	—	—	—	—	—		People Keep Talking
"Movie"	2014	—	—	—	—	—	—	—		People Keep Talking
"Dumb for You"	2014	—	—	—	—	—	—	—		People Keep Talking
"Act My Age"	2014	— (Note: "Act My Age" did not chart on the Hot 100, but did peak at number 13 on the Bubbling Under Hot 100 chart.)	40	—	—	—	—	—		People Keep Talking
"Numbers"	2014	—	49	—	—	—	—	—		People Keep Talking
"All About It" (featuring Ed Sheeran)	2014	71	—	13	10	9	30	34	RIAA: Gold	People Keep Talking
"Let It All Work Out"	2015	—	—	—	—	—	—	—		Non-album singles
"The Moment" (featuring Travis Garland)	2015	—	—	—	—	—	—	—		Non-album singles
"Champagne and Pools" (featuring Blackbear and KYLE)	2015	—	—	—	—	—	—	—		Happy Camper
"Are U Having Any Fun?" (featuring Meghan Tonjes)	2016	—	—	—	—	—	—	—		Happy Camper
"Sushi"	2017	—	—	—	—	—	—	—		The Hype
"Know It All"	2017	—	—	—	—	—	—	—		The Hype
"Ain't Ready"	2017	—	—	—	—	—	—	—		The Hype
"Never Going Back"	2019	—	—	—	—	—	—	—		Whatever USA
"Come Around" (with Christian French)	2019	—	—	—	—	—	—	—		Whatever USA
"Hell of a Time"	2019	—	—	—	—	—	—	—		Whatever USA
"Buddy" (with Connor Price)	2022	—	—	—	—	—	— (Note: "Buddy" did not chart on the NZ Top 40 Singles chart, but did peak at number 23 on the NZ Hot Singles chart.)	—		Non-album singles
"Pretty Face"	2025	—	—	—	—	—	— (Note: "Pretty Face" did not chart on the NZ Top 40 Singles chart, but did peak at number 21 on the NZ Hot Singles chart.)	—		Non-album singles
"—" denotes a recording that did not chart or was not released in that territory.

=== Other charted and certified songs ===
Title	Year	Certifications	Album
"Surprise Party" (featuring Blackbear)	2016	RIAA: Gold	Happy Camper
