= Parker (surname) =

English surname meaning "keeper of the park"

- Pronunciation: PAR-ker

Origin
- Meaning: 'keeper of the park'
- Region of origin: England

Parker is a surname of English origin, derived from Old French with the meaning 'keeper of the park'. "Parker" was also a nickname given to gamekeepers in medieval England. In the United States, it ranked in 1990 as the 47th most-common surname.

== A ==
- Aaron Parker (soccer) (born 1986), American soccer player
- Aaron Parker (American football) (born 1998), American football player
- A. J. Parker (born 1998), American football player
- Al Parker (disambiguation), multiple people
- Alan Parker (disambiguation), multiple people
- Albert Parker (disambiguation), multiple people
- Alfred Parker (disambiguation), multiple people
- Alice Parker (disambiguation), multiple people
- Alison Parker (reporter) (1991–2015), American television news reporter murdered in 2015 during a live interview
- Alton B. Parker, American judge and presidential candidate
- Andrea Parker, American actress
- Andrea Grimes Parker, American computer scientist
- Andrew Parker (disambiguation), multiple people
- Andy Parker (disambiguation), multiple people
- Angel Parker, American actress
- Ann Parker (disambiguation), multiple people
- Anne Parker (disambiguation), multiple people
- Angel Parker (born 1980), American actress
- Angelo Parker (born 1984), Canadian wrestler
- Annise Parker (born 1956), American politician
- Anthony Parker (born 1975), American NBA basketball player and general manager of Lakeland Magic
- Antonina Parker (died 1997), American politician
- Arlie Parker (born 1938), Canadian ice hockey player
- Arthur Parker (disambiguation), multiple people
- Ashley Parker (born 1982), American journalist
- Aurelius Dwight Parker (1802–1875), American politician from Massachusetts

== B ==
- Barbara Parker (disambiguation), multiple people
- Barnett Parker (1886–1941), British actor
- Ben Parker (footballer) (born 1987), English football player
- Ben Parker, English singer-songwriter, member of Ben & Jason
- Ben L. Parker (1913–2003), member of the Pennsylvania House of Representatives
- Bernard Parker (born 1986), South African professional association footballer
- Bert Parker, né Bert Parke (1886–1967), Australian rules footballer
- Beth L. Parker, Canadian hydrogeologist
- Bill Parker (disambiguation), multiple people
- Billy Parker (disambiguation), multiple people
- Blake Parker (born 1985), American baseball player
- Bob Parker (disambiguation), multiple people
- Bonnie Parker (1910–1934), American outlaw
- Brad Parker (disambiguation), multiple people
- Brad Parker (rugby league) (born 1997), Australian rugby league footballer
- Brandon Parker (born 1995), American football player
- Brendan Parker (born 1971), Australian rules footballer
- Brant Parker (1920–2007), American cartoonist
- Bonnie Parker (1910–1934), part of the American crime duo Bonnie and Clyde
- Brent Parker (born 1945), American politician
- Brett Parker, American politician
- Brian Parker (disambiguation), multiple people
- Bridget Parker (equestrian) (born 1939), English equestrian and Olympic champion
- Brock Parker (born 1981), American poker player
- Brooks Parker (1889–1951), American foil sabre fencer

== C ==
- Caitlin Parker (born 1996), Australian boxer
- Candace Parker (born 1986), American basketball player
- Camille Parker, American country singer
- Camilla Parker Bowles (born 1947), Queen of the United Kingdom since 2022
- Cameron Parker, Scottish businessman
- Carl Parker (born 1965), American professional football player
- Carl A. Parker (1934–2024), American politician
- Cary Millholland Parker, American landscape architect
- Caryl Mack Parker, American singer-songwriter
- Catherine Parker (died 2003), American politician
- Cecil Parker (1897–1971), English actor
- Cecilia Parker (1914–1993), Canadian-born American actress
- Charlotte Blair Parker (1858–1937), American playwright and actress
- Chase Parker (born 1994), American actor and filmmaker
- Chase Parker (golfer) (born 1991), American professional golfer
- Charles Parker (disambiguation), multiple people
  - Charlie Parker (1920–1955), American jazz musician
- Cherelle Parker, American politician
- Christopher Parker (disambiguation), multiple people
- Claire Parker, American engineer and animator
- Clifton Parker, English composer
- Colonel Tom Parker (1909–1997), Dutch-American manager of Elvis Presley
- Constance-Anne Parker (1921–2016), British sculptor
- Corey Parker (disambiguation), multiple people
- Craig Parker (born 1970), New Zealand actor
- Critchley Parker (1862–1944), Australian newspaperman, also his son (died 1942)
- Curtis Parker (1901–1982), American football and basketball player and coach
- Cynthia Ann Parker, American captive of Comanche

== D ==
- Dai Parker (1904–1965), Welsh international rugby union footballer
- Dave Parker (1951–2025), American baseball player
- Dave Parker (rock musician), American musician
- Dave Parker (rugby), English rugby league player
- David Parker (disambiguation), multiple people
- Daniel Parker (artist) (born 1959), American sculptor
- Darrell Parker (born 1952), Australian Anglican bishop
- Dawaun Parker, American hip hop producer
- Dean Parker (1947–2020), New Zealand screenwriter
- Deborah Parker (born 1970), American activist and indigenous leader
- Dee Parker (died 2000), American actress
- De'Mond Parker (born 1976), American football player
- Dennis Parker (born 1950), American football coach
- Dennis Parker (speedway rider) (1925–2008), English international motorcycle speedway rider
- Dennis F. Parker (1945–2016), American musician and recording engineer
- Derek Parker (1932–2025), British writer and broadcaster
- Derek Parker (footballer) (1926–2011), English footballer
- Derrick Parker (born 1957), English professional footballer
- Deshawn L. Parker (born 1971), American thoroughbred horse racing jockey
- Devante Parker (born 1996), German soccer footballer
- DeVante Parker (born 1993), American football player
- Dolores Parker (1919–2018), American jazz singer
- Dominic Parker (born 1964), English television personality
- Don Parker (disambiguation), multiple people
- Dorothee Parker (born 1938), German actress
- Dorothy Parker (1893–1967), American poet, writer, and literary critic
- Douglas H. Parker (1926–2019), American law school professor
- Dylan Parker (born 1999), English footballer

== E ==
- E. T. Parker (Ernest Tilden Parker, 1926–1991), mathematics professor
- Eddie Parker (pool player) (1932–2001), American pool player
- Edie Parker (artist) (born 1956), Canadian sculptor
- Edna Parker (1893–2008), American supercentenarian
- Edna G. Parker (1930–1996), United States Tax Court judge
- Edward Harper Parker (1849–1926), English barrister and sinologist
- Edwin B. Parker (1868–1929), American lawyer and public official
- Edwin Wallace Parker (1833–1901), American Methodist bishop
- Elaine Parker (1926–2009) American activist
- Eleanor Parker (1922–2013), American actress
- Ellis Parker Butler (1869–1937), American author
- Ely S. Parker (1828–1895), American attorney and engineer
- Eric Parker (disambiguation), multiple people
- Eugene Parker (1927–2022), American astrophysicist
- Eugene Parker (sports agent) (1956–2016), American sports agent
- Evan Parker (born 1944), British saxophone player

== F ==
- F. William Parker (born 1941), American film, stage and television actor
- Ferdinand Lucas Parker (1885–1959), South Australian public servant
- Fess Parker (1924–2010), American actor
- Frank Parker (disambiguation), multiple people
- Franklin Parker (1902–1962), American character actor

== G ==
- Garry Parker, English footballer
- Geoff Parker, English biology professor
- Geoffrey Parker (disambiguation), multiple people
- George Parker (disambiguation), multiple people
- Gerad Parker (born 1981), American football coach
- Garald G. Parker (1905–2000), American hydrologist
- Gerald Parker (born 1955), American serial killer
- Gloria Parker (1921–2022), American musician and bandleader
- Gordon Parker (disambiguation), multiple people
- Graeme Parker (born 1982), Scottish cattle hoof trimmer and YouTuber
- Graham Parker, English singer-songwriter
- Grahame Parker (1912–1995), English sportsman
- Grant Parker, South African classics professor

== H ==
- Hampton Wildman Parker, English zoologist and author
- Henry E. Parker (1928–2018), American politician and Connecticut State Treasurer
- Horatio Parker (1863–1919), American composer
- Hugh Parker (born 2006), Irish footballer
- Hyde Parker (disambiguation), multiple people

== I ==
- Ira Parker, American screenwriter and producer
- Ira W. Parker (1877–1960), American politician
- Isaac Parker (disambiguation), multiple people
- Isaac C. Parker (1838–1896), American politician and jurist
- Isaac T. Parker (1849–1911), American politician
- Isaiah Parker (born 2002), American soccer player
- Ivan Parker (born 1957), American gospel singer
- Ivy Parker (1907–1985), American chemist and engineer

== J ==
- Jabari Parker (born 1995), American basketball player
- Jack Parker (disambiguation), multiple people
- Jacob Parker, American basketball player
- James Parker (disambiguation), multiple people
- Jameson Parker (born 1947), American actor
- Jamie Parker, English actor
- Jamie Parker (politician), Australian Greens politician
- Jane E. Parker, British botanist
- Jasmine Parker, British actress and singer
- Jean Parker (1915–2005), American actress
- Jeff Parker (disambiguation), multiple people
- Jeffrey A. Parker (1957–2018), American businessman and education philanthropist
- Jennifer D. Parker, American statistician
- Joel Parker (disambiguation), multiple people
- John Parker (disambiguation), multiple people
- Johnny Parker (jazz pianist) (1929–2010), British jazz pianist
- JoJo Parker (born 2006), American baseball player
- Jonathan Parker (disambiguation), multiple people
- Joseph Parker (disambiguation), multiple people
- Judy Parker, American record producer and songwriter
- Julia Parker (disambiguation), multiple people
- Junior Parker (1932–1971), American blues singer and harmonica player
- J. B. Parker, American convicted murderer

== K ==
- Kathleen Parker, American journalist
- Kathy Parker (born 1943), American politician
- Keigan Parker, Scottish footballer
- Ken Parker (disambiguation), multiple people
- Kevin Parker (musician), Australian musician
- Kevin Parker (New York politician), New York state senator
- Kim Ian Parker (born 1956), Canadian religious studies scholar
- K. J. Parker, pen name of British author Tom Holt

== L ==
- Larry Parker (disambiguation), multiple people
- Laura Parker (born 1947), American artist
- Lauren Parker (born 1988), Australian paratriathlete
- Lauren Parker (boxer) (born 1991), English professional boxer
- Lilian Parker (1874–1947), British artist
- Linda Vivienne Parker (born 1958), judge of the United States District Court for the Eastern District of Michigan
- Lindsay Parker (born 1980), American actress
- Liza Parker (born 1980), English badminton player
- Louis N. Parker, English dramatist, composer, and translator
- Louise Parker, Canadian gymnast
- Lowell Holden Parker, American politician
- L. P. E. Parker, British classical scholar
- Lu Parker (born 1968), American beauty pageant titleholder and speaker
- Luther Parker, American politician
- Lyndsey Parker, American journalist
- Lynne Parker, American roboticist

== M ==
- Mable Parker McLean (1922–2012), American academic administrator
- Malinda Jackson Parker (c. 1903–1978), Liberian musician and politician
- Margaret Eleanor Parker (1827–1896), British activist, reformer, and travel writer
- Mary-Louise Parker (born 1964), American actress
- Marshall Parker (1922–2008), South Carolina politician
- Maceo Parker, American saxophonist
- Mack Charles Parker (1936–1959) in Lynching of Mack Charles Parker, American murder victim
- Marion Parker (1915–1927), in Murder of Marion Parker American murder victim
- Marion Parker (architect) (1873–1935), American architect
- Marlon Parker, South African social entrepreneur
- Mary Ann Parker, English traveller and writer (1765/6–1848)
- Matt Parker, Australian stand-up comedian, author, YouTube personality and maths communicator
- Matthew Parker (disambiguation), multiple people
- Maurice S. Parker, United States diplomat
- Maurice W. Parker Sr. (1873–1958), American voice coach, champion rifle shot and billiard player
- Max Parker (disambiguation), multiple people
- Wes Parker, American baseball player
- Maynard T. Parker, American politician
- Melonie Parker, American Chief Diversity Officer at Google
- Melvin Parker, American drummer
- Milo Parker (born 2002), English actor
- Mitchell Parker, American baseball player
- Molly Parker (born 1972), Canadian actress, writer, and director

== N ==
- Nate Parker (born 1979), American actor and filmmaker
- Nathaniel Parker (born 1962), English actor
- Nicholas Parker (disambiguation), multiple people
- Nick Parker (born 1954), British Army officer
- Nick Parker (journalist) (born 1960/1961), English journalist
- Nico Parker (born 2004), British actress
- Nicole Parker (born 1978), American actor and singer
- Nicole Ari Parker (born 1970), American actress and model
- Nosey Parker, epithet for Matthew Parker, Archbishop of Canterbury

== O ==
- Ol Parker (born 1969), English director, producer and screenwriter
- Oliver Parker (born 1960), English director, screenwriter and actor

== P ==
- Parker (Hampshire cricketer), English cricketer playing 1803–1806
- Paige Parker (born 1995), Australian rules footballer
- Paul Parker (disambiguation), multiple people
- Pauline Parker, of the 1954 Parker-Hulme murder
- Pete Parker, Canadian radio announcer
- Peter Parker (disambiguation), multiple people
- Pomeroy Parker, American Medal of Honor recipient
- Prosper P. Parker (1836–1918), Canadian-born American engineer and politician

== Q ==
- Quanah Parker (c. 1845–1911), Comanche leader

== R ==
- Rachael Parker, Canadian bishop
- Raymond Parker (disambiguation), multiple people, including Ray Parker
- Riley Parker (soccer) (born 2000), American professional women's soccer player
- Rob Parker (disambiguation), multiple people
- Robert Parker (disambiguation), multiple people
- Roland Parker (1925–2020), English first-class cricketer
- Ross Parker (songwriter) (1914–1974), English songwriter, actor, and pianist
- Ross Parker (died 2001) in Murder of Ross Parker, English teenager murder victim

== S ==
- Samuel Parker (disambiguation), multiple people
- Sarah Parker, North Carolina judge
- Sarah Jessica Parker (born 1965), American actress
- Scott Parker (disambiguation), multiple people
- Sean Parker (born 1979), American entrepreneur
- Shane Parker (disambiguation), multiple people
- Shawn Parker (born 1993), German footballer
- Sidney Parker (anarchist), British anarchist
- Simon C. Parker, British economist
- Sista Monica Parker (1956–2014), American singer, songwriter, and record producer
- Smush Parker (born 1981), American basketball player
- Sonny Parker (disambiguation), multiple people
- Stanley Parker (1909–1981), Australian journalist and celebrity artist
- Stephen Parker (disambiguation), multiple people
- Steve Parker (disambiguation), multiple people
- Steven Parker (disambiguation), multiple people
- Stewart Parker (scientist), British scientist
- Stuart Parker (disambiguation), multiple people
- Suzy Parker, American model and actress

== T ==
- Tan Parker, American politician
- Theodore Parker (1810–1860), American Unitarian minister
- Theodore A. Parker III, American ornithologist
- Theodore W. Parker, United States Army General
- Thomas Parker (disambiguation), multiple people
- Timothy Britten Parker, "Toby" Parker, American actor
- Timothy Parker (disambiguation), multiple people
- Tina Parker, American actress and director
- Tine Moberg-Parker (born 1969), Canadian sailor
- T. J. Parker (born 1984), French-American basketball player and coach
- T. J. Parker (American football) (born 2004), American football player
- Tom Parker (disambiguation), multiple people
- Tommy Parker (disambiguation), multiple people
- Tony Parker (born 1982), French basketball player
- Tony Parker (basketball, born 1993) (born 1993), American basketball player
- Trey Parker (born 1969), American animator and filmmaker

== U ==
- Una-Mary Parker (1930–2019), English journalist and novelist
- Ursula Parker (born 2003), American actress

== V ==
- Victoria "Porkchop" Parker (born 1970), American drag performer and actor
- Vincent Parker (1918–1946), Australian RAF flying ace, prisoner of war and a serial escaper

== W ==
- Walker B. Parker né Walter B. Parker (1926–2014), American civil servant, adviser, academic and politician
- Walter Richard Parker, English Victoria Cross recipient
- Wayshawn Parker, American football player
- Wes Parker, American baseball player
- William Parker (disambiguation), multiple people
- Wil Parker (born 2002), Australian rules football player
- Will Parker (rugby union) (1873–1955), Welsh international rugby union footballer
- Wilson Parker (1909–?), English professional footballer

== Z ==
- Zach Parker (born 1994), British boxer
- Zachary Parker, American politician and educator

== Fictional characters ==
- Parker (Stark novels character), ruthless criminal in novels by Donald E. Westlake writing as Richard Stark
- Alison Parker (Melrose Place), character in the television series Melrose Place
- Aloysius Parker, in the British 1960s television series Thunderbirds
- April Parker, Mayday's clone and the superhero Spider-Girl/Mayhem
- Annie Parker, main character in the 2013 American drama film, Decoding Annie Parker
- Audrey Parker (Haven), fictional character in Haven
- Audrey Parker-Nichols, fictional character in Drake & Josh
- Audrey Parker (The 4400), fictional character in The 4400
- Benjamin Richard Parker, son of Peter Parker and little brother of Spider-Girl in the Marvel Comics 2 continuity
- Benji Parker, a character from the alternate future Marvel Comics 2 universe
- Bridget Parker, from the Australian soap opera Neighbours
- C. J. Parker, from the television series Baywatch
- Coleman Parker, in TV series The Wire
- Darius Parker, minor fictional character in television series, Law & Order: Special Victims Unit
- Dell Parker, from Private Practice TV series
- Kaine Parker, Spider-Man's clone
- Ken Parker (comics), from a series of eponymous Italian comics created by Giancarlo Berardi and Ivo Milazzo
- Kim Parker (character), in Moesha and The Parkers
- Kristen Parker, in the A Nightmare on Elm Street film series
- Aunt May, May Parker, Spider-Man's aunt
- Mayday Parker, the public identity of the Marvel Comics' superhero Spider-Girl
- Peter Parker, the public identity of the Marvel Comics' superhero Spider-Man
  - Peter Parker (2002 film series character), his counterpart in Sam Raimi's Spider-Man trilogy
  - Peter Parker (The Amazing Spider-Man film series), his counterpart in The Amazing Spider-Man film series
  - Peter Parker (Marvel Cinematic Universe), his counterpart in the Marvel Cinematic Universe
  - Alternative versions of Peter Parker, his counterpart in the Marvel Comics Multiverse
- Peni Parker, the public identity of the Marvel Comics' superhero SP//dr
- Penny Parker, the heroine of a series of 17 books written by Mildred Benson
- Penny Parker (MacGyver), recurring fictional character in the 1985 television series MacGyver and its 2016 reboot
- Richard and Mary Parker, Spider-Man's biological parents
- Riley Parker, from the Australian television soap opera, Neighbours
- Richard Parker, the tiger in The Life of Pi
- Tej Parker, The Fast and the Furious character
- Teresa Parker, Spider-Man's sister
- Ben Parker "Uncle Ben," a fictional character who is the uncle of Peter Parker / Spider-Man

== See also ==
- Parker (given name)
