= David Parker =

David or Dave Parker may refer to:

== Arts and literature ==
- David Parker (director) (born 1947), Australian cinematographer
- David Parker (sound engineer) (born 1951), American sound engineer
- Dave Parker (rock musician) (born 1978), record producer, keyboard and guitar player used to play with Coheed and Cambria in their live shows
- Dave Parker (pornographic actor), actor in gay pornography
- Busy Bee Starski (David James Parker; born 1962), American musician

== Law and politics ==
- David Stuart Parker (1919–1990), Governor of the Panama Canal Zone
- Dave Parker (politician) (1940-2025), Canadian politician
- David J. Parker (born 1947), Canadian politician, leader of the Alberta Green Party
- David Parker (Australian politician) (born 1953), Australian politician from Western Australia
- David Parker (New Zealand politician) (born 1960), New Zealand politician
- David Parker (Mississippi politician) (born 1969), American optometrist and politician
- David Parker (Pennsylvania politician), American politician

== Sports ==
- Dave Parker (rugby) (1935–2018), rugby league footballer of the 1960s for Great Britain, and Oldham
- Dave Parker (1951–2025), American baseball player
- David Parker (swimmer) (1959–2010), British Olympic swimmer
- David Parker (football manager) (born 1984), English football manager

== Other ==
- David C. Parker (born 1953), theology professor and textual critic
- David Parker (chemist) (born 1956), English chemical scientist and academic
- David Parker (climatologist), head of climate monitoring at the Hadley Centre

== See also ==
- Dai Parker (1904–1965), Welsh international rugby union player
- David Parker Ray (1939–2002), American serial killer
- David Parker Gibbs (1911–1987), United States Army General
