= Andrew Park =

Andrew Park may refer to:

- Andrew Park (animator), English animator
- Andrew Park (poet) (1807–1863), Scottish poet
- Andrew Park (theatre director), American theatre director and puppeteer
- Andrew Park (tennis) (born 1980), American former tennis player
- Andrew S. Park, Korean American Methodist theologian

== See also ==
- Andy Park (disambiguation)
- Andrew Haydon Park, a park on the Ottawa River in the city of Ottawa
