= Joseph Parker (disambiguation) =

Joseph Parker (born 1992) is a New Zealand boxer.

Joseph or Joe Parker may also refer to:

- Joseph Parker (theologian) (1830–1902), English Nonconformist divine
- Joseph Parker (biologist) (born 1979 or 1980), Welsh evolutionary biologist working in the U.S.
- Joseph Parker (cricketer) (born 1976), English cricketer
- Brooks Parker (Joseph Brooks Bloodgood Parker, 1889–1951), American Olympic fencer
- Joseph Parker (athlete) (born 1978), Paralympic athlete
- Joseph Parker Jr. (1916–2012), American doctor
- Joseph Parker (mining engineer) (1871–1940), Scottish mining engineer and educator
- Joseph Lincoln Parker (1898–1959), American architectural engineer
- Joe Parker (American football) (1923–1998), American football player
- Joe Parker (athletic director), American sports executive
- Joe Parker (football manager), Scottish football manager
- Joe Parker (footballer) (born 1995), English footballer
- Joe Parker (comedian), South African comedian
- JoJo Parker (Joseph Paul Parker Jr., born 2006), American baseball player
