= Brian Parker =

Brian Parker may refer to:

- Brian Parker (American football) (born 1992), American football tight end
- Brian Parker II (born 2004), American football offensive lineman
- Brian Parker (Australian footballer) (1944–2001), Australian rules footballer
- Brian Parker (politician) (born 1950s), English politician
- Brian Parker (sports agent), American sports agent
