= Bert Parker =

Bert Parker may refer to:

- Bert Parker, character in Those We Love
- Bert Parker (trainer), see List of Harrow Borough F.C. seasons

== See also ==
- Albert Parker (disambiguation)
- Robert Parker (disambiguation)
- Herbert Parker (disambiguation)
- Hubert Parker (disambiguation)
