= Samuel Parker =

Samuel Parker may refer to:

== Clergy ==
- Samuel Parker (bishop of Oxford) (1640–1688), English bishop and theologian
- Samuel Parker (bishop of Massachusetts) (1744–1804), Episcopal bishop of Massachusetts, United States
- Samuel Parker (missionary) (1779–1866), missionary in Oregon Country from New York, United States

== Politicians ==
- Samuel Parker (Hawaii politician) (1853–1920), heir to the Parker Ranch estate and politician in Hawaii
- Samuel Parker (Oregon politician) (1806–1886), pioneer and politician in the Oregon Territory, United States
- Samuel W. Parker (1805–1859), American politician from Indiana

== Sportspeople ==
- Samuel Parker (footballer) (1872–?), Scottish footballer
- Sam Parker (footballer) (born 2006), Welsh football midfielder
- Samuel Parker (wrestler) (1931–2023), Australian Olympic wrestler
- Sam Y. Parker (1880–1906), American college football and baseball player

== Others ==
- Sam Parker, African American research assistant to Joseph Henry at Princeton University
- Samuel Parker (writer) (1681–1730), English writer and publisher
- Samuel D. Parker (attorney) (1781–1873), American attorney who served as district attorney of Suffolk County, Massachusetts
- Samuel D. Parker (soldier) (1868–1953), American militia officer in the Massachusetts Volunteer Militia and the State Guard of Massachusetts
- Samuel Hale Parker (1781–1864), American music publisher
- Samuel I. Parker (1891–1975), United States Army officer and Medal of Honor recipient
- Samuel William Langston Parker, English surgeon
- Sam Parker (actor), voice actor; the voice of Gulliver in the 1939 film Gulliver's Travels

== Fictional ==
- Sam Parker, character in the 1915 film After Five

== See also ==
- Samuel Parker House (disambiguation)
- Samuel Parks (disambiguation)
- Samuel Parkes (disambiguation)
