= Sunday Times Rich List 2009 =

2009 list of richest 1,000 people in the UK

The Sunday Times Rich List 2009 was published on 26 April 2009.

Since 1989 the UK national Sunday newspaper The Sunday Times (sister paper to The Times) has published an annual magazine supplement to the newspaper called the Sunday Times Rich List. The list is based on an estimate of the minimum wealth of the richest 1,000 people or families in the United Kingdom as of January of that year, and is compiled by Dr Philip Beresford.

A separate section lists the 250 richest Irish, including both Northern Ireland and the Republic of Ireland.

As in previous years, the List was widely previewed in the UK media and extensively covered on the day of its publication.

The top three places in the List were unchanged from the previous year. The Hinduja brothers, ranked 4th in 2008, and Leonard Blavatnik, ranked 11th in 2008, were removed from the list. Among the most notable changes were the loss of £155 billion from the collective fortunes of Britain's richest 1,000 people, equivalent to more than a third of their estimated wealth, as a consequence of the recession.

== Top 25 fortunes ==
2009		Name	Citizenship	Source of wealth	2008	
Rank	Net worth £ bn	Name	Citizenship	Source of wealth	Rank	Net worth £ bn
1	£10.80 ▼	Lakshmi Mittal and family	India	Steel	1	£27.70
2	£7.00 ▼	Roman Abramovich	Russia	Oil, industry, owner of Chelsea FC	2	£11.70
3	£6.50 ▼	The Duke of Westminster	United Kingdom	Property (Grosvenor Group)	3	£7.00
4 ▲	£5.00 ▼	Ernesto and Kirsty Bertarelli		Pharmaceuticals	6	£5.65
5 ▲	£4.00 ▼	Hans Rausing		Packaging	7	£5.40
6 ▲	£3.83 ▼	Sir Philip Green and Lady Green	United Kingdom	Retailing	9	£4.33
7 ▲	£2.96 ▼	Charlene Carvalho and Michel Carvalho	Netherlands	Inheritance, brewing, banking (Heineken)	13	£3.63
8 ▲	£2.68 ▼	Sammy Ofer and Eyal Ofer		Shipping, Property	15	£3.34
9 ▼	£2,50 ▼	John Fredriksen		Shipping	8	£4.65
9 ▲	£2.50 ▼	Joe Lewis	United Kingdom	Foreign exchange, investment	19	£2.80
9 ▲	£2.50 ▼	Kirsten Rausing and Jorn Rausing		Inheritance, investment (Tetra Pak)	14	£3.50
9 ▲	£2.50 ▼	David and Simon Reuben		Property	10	£4.30
13 ▼	£2.30 ▼	Seán Quinn and family		Quarrying, property, insurance	12	£3.73
14 ▲	£2.00 ▼	Charles Cadogan, 8th Earl Cadogan and family		Property (Cadogan Estates)	17	£2.93
15 ▲	£1.80 ▼	Alan Parker		Duty-free shopping	28	£2.09
16 ▲	£1.61 ▲	Sir Ken Morrison and family		Supermarket	52	£1.45
17 ▲	£1.55 ▼	Roddie Fleming and family		Finance	35	£1.90
18 ▼	£1.50 ▼	Alisher Usmanov		Steel, Mines	5	£5.73
18 ▲	£1.50	Eddie and Sol Zakay		Property	47	£1.50
18 ▲	£1.50 ▼	Mahdi Al Tajir		Metals, oil, water	26	£2.20
18 ▲	£1.50	Mark Pears and family		Property	47	£1.50
18	£1.50 ▼	Nicky Oppenheimer	South Africa	Diamonds, mining (De Beers)	18	£2.87
18 ▲	£1.50 ▼	Poju Zabludowicz		Property, hotels	31	£2.00
24	£1.47 ▼	Bernie Ecclestone	United Kingdom	Motor racing	24	£2.40
25 ▲	£1.40 ▼	John Caudwell		Mobile phones	44	£1.60
25 ▲	£1.40 ▼	Ian and Richard Livingstone		Property	38	£1.88

== See also ==
- Lists of billionaires
