= Oak Foundation =

Swiss Charitable Foundation

- Oak Foundation logo
- Formation: 1983; 43 years ago
- Founder: Alan M. Parker
- Purpose: Charitable grants
- Headquarters: Geneva, Switzerland.
- Coordinates: 46.2236°N 6.1097°E
- President: Douglas Griffiths
- Revenue: USD 383 million (grants made)
- Website: oakfnd.org

The Oak Foundation is a charitable foundation headquartered in Geneva, Switzerland. It was founded in 1983 by billionaire Alan M. Parker, co-founder of the duty-free company DFS Group.

The foundation makes grants in eight major program areas plus two country-level programs (in Denmark and Zimbabwe). In 2025, the Oak Foundation reported making roughly one thousand grants in 33 countries totaling US$383 million.

Oak Foundation's support for issues such as climate justice and human rights has attracted criticism from conservative organizations and governments such as Russia's, where in January 2026 it was announced that the Oak Foundation was classified as undesirable in Russia under the Russian undesirable organizations law.
