= Andy Park =

Andy Park may refer to:

- Andy Park (broadcaster), Australian radio broadcaster and journalist, hosts The World Today on ABC Radio National
- Andy Park (artist) (born 1975), Korean-American comic book artist, illustrator, and concept artist
- Andy Park (Mr. Christmas), British electrician who claims to have celebrated Christmas Day every day since 1993
- Andy Park (musician) (born 1957), American musician, worship leader and author

== See also ==
- Andrew Park (disambiguation)
- Andy Parker (disambiguation)
- Park (disambiguation)
