= Scott Ellis (cricketer) =

English cricketer

Cricket information
- Batting: Right-handed
- Bowling: Right-arm medium-fast

Career statistics
Competition	First-class	List A
Matches	12	14
Runs scored	63	50
Batting average	7.87	12.50
100s/50s	0/0	0/0
Top score	15	20
Balls bowled	1,356	360
Wickets	20	10
Bowling average	44.00	31.00
5 wickets in innings	1	0
10 wickets in match	0	0
Best bowling	5/59	2/34
Catches/stumpings	8/–	2/–
- Source: Cricinfo, 8 November 2022

Scott William Kenneth Ellis (born 3 October 1975) is a former English cricketer who played county cricket for Worcestershire in the late 1990s.

After a number of games for Worcestershire's Second XI in the previous two seasons, Ellis made his only appearance for the England Under-19 team in April 1995, in a minor match against Somerset's second team, which contained Andy Caddick and Mushtaq Ahmed (cricketer). In a huge 309-run win, Ellis acquitted himself well with the bat, making 45 and 25 not out, but a match bowling analysis of 16-4-81-0 was considerably worse than that of his bowling team-mates, and he never again played for an England team at any level.

In June 1995 Ellis made his first-class debut, for Combined Universities against the West Indians. Although the tourists' first-innings 637/5 declared ensured that there was no chance of a win for the students (in fact the game was drawn) Ellis took 5–59 in the second innings, which remained the only five-wicket haul of his career. His first victim in first-class cricket was Stuart Williams.

After one game for British Universities in the 1996 Benson & Hedges Cup, Ellis made his senior Worcestershire debut against Glamorgan in the NatWest Trophy in late June. He was not much of a success, his seven overs bringing only two tail-end wickets for the cost of 34 runs, but two days later he was given a County Championship debut against Yorkshire and took three wickets in the game, including those of Michael Vaughan and Michael Bevan. Ellis retained his place in the side until the end of the season, but was expensive, his 14 first-class wickets coming at 49.00, though he did a little better in one-day cricket.

Ellis played no first-team cricket the following summer, and was diagnosed with three stress fractures in his back at the end of the season. In 1998 he was selected only twice. His only wicket that season, and indeed his last for Worcestershire, was that of Oxford University's Joseph Parker. At the end of 1998 he left the county and played in the Minor Counties Championship (and once in the NatWest Trophy) for Shropshire, as well as making appearances for the Second XIs of both Middlesex, taking nine wickets in a game against Warwickshire, and Nottinghamshire. In 2001 he played two C&G Trophy games for the Worcestershire Cricket Board XI, his last List A wicket coming when he dismissed Steven Knox of Cumberland.
