= Aaron Parker =

Aaron Parker may refer to:

- Aaron Parker (soccer) (born 1986), American soccer player
- Aaron Parker (American football) (born 1998), American football wide receiver
- Aaron Parker, former owner of Aaron and Margaret Parker Jr. House
