= Ordinary Joe (disambiguation) =

Ordinary Joe is an American drama television series.

Ordinary Joe may also refer to:

- Average Joe (Ordinary Joe), a term used to refer to an average person
- "Ordinary Joe", a song by English band Cubanate on their album Interference
- "Ordinary Joe (WCH)", a song by rapper Weerd Science on his album Friends and Nervous Breakdowns
