= Gordon Parker =

Gordon Parker may refer to:

- Gordon Parker (psychiatrist), Australian professor of psychiatry
- Gordon Parker (author) (born 1940), British novelist and playwright
- Gordon R. Parker, business executive
