= Edwin Parker =

Edwin Parker may refer to:

- Edwin B. Parker (1868–1929), American lawyer and public official
- Edwin P. Parker Jr. (1891–1983), United States Army general
- Edwin Wallace Parker (1833–1901), American Methodist Episcopal missionary bishop
