= Bobby Parker =

Bobby Parker may refer to:

- Bobby Parker (footballer, born 1891) (1891–1950), Scottish footballer (Rangers, Everton)
- Bobby Parker (footballer, born 1925) (1925–1997), Scottish footballer (Heart of Midlothian)
- Bobby Parker (footballer, born 1952), English footballer (Carlisle United, Queen of the South)
- Bobby Parker (guitarist) (1937–2013), American rhythm and blues musician

== See also ==
- Bob Parker (disambiguation)
- Robert Parker (disambiguation)
