= Alfred Parker =

Alfred Parker may refer to:

- Alfred Browning Parker (1916–2011), Modernist architect
- Alfred Parker (mayor) (1875-1935), New South Wales politician

== See also ==
- Al Parker (disambiguation)
