= Nicholas Parker =

Nicholas Parker may refer to:

- Nick Parker (journalist), English journalist
- Nicholas Parker (MP) (1547–1620), MP for Sussex
- Nick Parker (born 1954), British Army officer
