= Jillian Cardarelli =

American country music singer-songwriter

- Born: Haverhill, Massachusetts U.S.
- Occupations: Singer; songwriter; actress
- Years active: 2013–present
- Spouse: Brian Parker (m. 2021)
- Website: https://www.jilliancardarelli.com/

Jillian Marie Cardarelli is an American country music artist, songwriter, and actress.

== Music ==
Cardarelli first gained national attention in 2014 when she was nominated for an AIM Independent Music Award for her song "Worth the Whiskey". In her breakout 2017, she was named one of Rolling Stone’s "10 New Country Artists You Need to Know", and in September, the video for her single “Rerun” premiered on Country Music Television. Written by Grammy-winning artist Maren Morris, Tina Parol, and Jordan Reynolds, the song spent two weeks at the number one spot on CMT’s 12-Pack Countdown.

In October 2019, Cardarelli released “I Never Do This,” and Rolling Stone added the Alex Kline-produced track to its “10 Best Country and Americana Songs of the Week” column. “Strong,” co-written with Charles Esten, was released the following year, and American Songwriter called it "one of 2020's most powerful songs."

Cardarelli’s Elvis Presley-inspired single “If I Could Talk to Elvis” was released in August 2023. Written with songwriters Parol and Kline, the track also features vocals by Larry Strickland, who was Presley's background vocalist from the Stamps Quartet. The video reached number one on CMT’s 12-Pack Countdown. In 2024, Cardarelli collaborated with songwriter and artist Vince Gill, releasing her song "I'll Get Over You," which also featured Gill.

Cardarelli’s music has been featured in film and television, including the 2021 Netflix feature film Stars Fell on Alabama. Her song “Waiting on the Sunrise” appeared on Fox’s Farmer Wants a Wife, and “Same Moon” was featured in season seven of Netflix’s Love Is Blind. “Crossroad Springs,” co-written with series lead Jonathan Stoddard and songwriter Ryan Sorestad, is the theme song of the series Crossroad Springs on Great American Family cable television network.

Cardarelli appears in Graceland’s Icon Exhibit in Memphis, Tennessee, alongside Carrie Underwood, Dolly Parton, Kacey Musgraves, and Lainey Wilson.

== Acting ==
In 2025, Cardarelli made her acting debut as Janie Carson in the first season of Crossroad Springs on Great American Family cable television network. She reprised her role as Carson in season two, which premiered September 3, 2026.

== Personal life ==
Cardarelli married sports agent Brian Parker on May 15, 2021, in Nashville, Tennessee.

In June 2026, Cardarelli revealed she had been diagnosed with breast cancer. She is being treated at the Dana-Farber Cancer Institute in Boston, Massachusetts. “My hope is that young women hear my story and understand the importance of knowing their bodies, trusting their instincts, and advocating for themselves,” she said.
