= William Parker =

William Parker may refer to:

== Entertainment ==
- William Parker (musician) (born 1952), American jazz double bassist
- William Parker (screenwriter) (1886–1941), American screenwriter
- William Parker (Private Practice), character in the series TV Private Practice
- William Atticus Parker, (born 2004), American filmmaker and actor
- Bill Parker (broadcaster) (William Parker, 1928–2019), American broadcaster
- Bill Parker (comics) (William Lee Parker, 1911–1963), American comic book writer and editor
- F. William Parker (born 1941), American film, stage and television actor

== Military ==
- William Parker (privy counsellor) (c. 1465–1510), privy counsellor and standard-bearer to King Richard III
- William Parker (privateer) (died 1617), English captain and privateer, and also mayor of Plymouth
- Sir William Parker, 1st Baronet, of Harburn (1743–1802), British admiral
- Sir William Parker, 1st Baronet, of Shenstone (1781–1866), British admiral
- William Harwar Parker (1826–1896), United States Navy officer
- William Parker (Medal of Honor) (1832–?), American Civil War sailor and Medal of Honor recipient
- William Albert Parker, American Civil War Union Navy commander of James River forces

== Politicians ==
- William Parker (died 1403), member of parliament (MP) for City of London
- William Parker (died 1421), MP for Hertfordshire
- William Parker (fl.1410), MP for Great Yarmouth
- William Parker, 4th Baron Monteagle (1575–1622), English politician
- William H. Parker (politician) (1847–1908), US representative from South Dakota
- William Parker (Boston) (1793–1873), businessman and politician in the United States
- William Parker (MP for West Suffolk) (1802–1892), British Member of Parliament for West Suffolk, 1859–1880
- William Parker (Oregon politician), member of the Oregon Territorial Legislature, 1850
- William T. Parker (1928–2014), member of the Virginia Senate and House of Delegates

== Religion ==
- William Parker (priest, died c. 1631), rose to archdeacon in two dioceses
- William Parker (priest, died 1802) (c.1749–1802), Anglican controversialist
- William Parker (bishop) (1897–1982), bishop of Shrewsbury in the Church of England

== Sports ==
- William Parker (Oxford University cricketer) (1832–1873), English cricketer
- William Parker (New Zealand cricketer) (1862–1930), New Zealand cricketer
- William Parker (MCC cricketer) (1886–1915), English cricketer
- William Parker (bowls) (1892–1979), English bowls player
- Will Parker (rugby union) (1873–1955), rugby union player
- Sir William Parker, 3rd Baronet (1889–1971), British rower and Olympic medalist
- Smush Parker (born 1981), American basketball player
- Tony Parker (William Anthony Parker II, born 1982), French basketball player
- Billy Parker (baseball) (William David Parker, 1942–2003), American baseball player
- Billy Parker (gridiron football) (William Parker V, born 1981), American football linebacker
- Willie Parker (offensive lineman) (William Nolen Parker, born 1948), American football player
- Wil Parker (born 2002), Australian rules football player

== Other people ==
- William Parker (early settler) (1618–1686), settler in the Connecticut colony
- William Parker (builder) (1800–1854), St. John's, Newfoundland builder
- William Parker (abolitionist) (1821–1891), anti-slavery activist and freedom fighter
- William Parker (glassmaker) (?–1817), American glassmaker and inventor
- William Kitchen Parker (1823–1890), British physician and comparative anatomist
- William Parker (master) (1870–1953), Australian barrister in New South Wales
- William Belmont Parker (1871–1934), United States editor
- William H. Parker (physicist) (1941–), American physicist
- William H. Parker (police officer) (1905–1966), chief of the Los Angeles Police Department
- William Riley Parker (1906–1968), American scholar of John Milton
- William Vann Parker (1901-1987), American mathematician
- Bill Parker (inventor) (William P. Parker), American artist, scientist, and entrepreneur
- Will Parker (judge), American judge and lawyer

== See also ==
- Bill Parker (disambiguation)
- Billy Parker (disambiguation)
- Willie Parker (disambiguation)
