= Tom Parker =

Tom Parker may refer to:

== Music ==
- Colonel Tom Parker (1909–1997), Dutch musical entrepreneur, manager of Elvis Presley
- Tom Parker (musician) (1944–2013), British musician
- Tom Parker (singer) (1988–2022), British singer, member of The Wanted

== Sports ==
- Tom Parker (baseball) (1912–1964), American baseball player
- Tom Parker (basketball) (born 1950), American basketball player
- Tom Parker (footballer, born 1893) (1893–?), English footballer
- Tom Parker (footballer, born 1897) (1897–1987), English football player and manager
- Tom Parker (rugby union) (1891–1967), Welsh international rugby player

== Others ==
- Tom Parker (judge) (born 1951), American judge
- Tom Parker or Grover Gardner (born 1956), American audiobook narrator

== See also ==
- Thomas Parker (disambiguation)
- Tommy Parker (disambiguation)
- Parker (surname)
