= Albert Parker =

Albert Parker may refer to:

- Albert Parker (businessman) (1916–1995), American owner of the Claxton Bakery
- Albert Parker (director) (1885–1974), American film director, producer, screenwriter and actor
- Albert Parker, 3rd Earl of Morley (1843–1905), British peer and politician
- Albert Parker (footballer) (1927–2005), English footballer

== See also ==
- Bert Parker (disambiguation)
- Al Parker (disambiguation)
