= Parker Intermediate College =

Location
- Hallet Rd, Budh Bazaar, Moradabad, Uttar Pradesh; 244001; India
- Coordinates: 28.8354°N 78.7671°E

Information
- Website: parkercollege.in

Parker Intermediate College (also known as Parker Inter College or just Parker) is a historical college in the city of Moradabad, Uttar Pradesh, India. It was founded in 1865–1866. This institution was named after Vermont-born Edwin Wallace Parker, an American Methodist minister who eventually became the Methodist missionary bishop of southern Asia.

It started in the old church area of the Town Hall of Moradabad. In the year 1920, the college moved to its present building, on land donated by a family of zamindars, specifically for educational purposes. The families included the Kunwar family of Singh Bhawan of Chowk Tarikhana.

Parker Intermediate College follows the U.P. Board curriculum. It started as a High School and was upgraded to Intermediate College in 1940s.

Parker College celebrated its centennial in the 1965–66 academic year.

Parker has been known for its high standards of education. In December 2017, a State Level Science Exhibition was organised by the State Council of Educational Research and Training, Delhi (SCERT).
