= Herbert Parker =

Herbert or Herb Parker may refer to:

== Politicians ==
- Herbert Parker (American politician) (1856–1939), Massachusetts Attorney General
- John Parker (Labour politician) (Herbert John Harvey Parker, 1906–1987), British politician

== Others ==
- Herbert Parker (health physicist) (1910–1984), British/American medical scientist
- Herb Parker (1921–2007), American football coach
- Herb Parker Stadium, at Minot State University, named after Herb Parker

== See also ==
- Bert Parker (disambiguation)
