= Alexander Parker =

Alexander Parker may refer to:

- Alex Parker (1935–2010), Scottish international footballer
- Alexander Parker (politician) (1891–1960s), Australian politician
- Alexander Parker (Quaker), (1628–1689), British preacher and author
- Alexander Parker (Medal of Honor) (1832–1900), United States Navy sailor and Medal of Honor recipient

== See also ==
- Al Parker (disambiguation)
