= Ann Parker =

Ann Parker may refer to:

- Ann Parker (writer), historical and science writer
- Ann Parker (athlete), represented Scotland at 1976 IAAF World Cross Country Championships – Senior women's race
- Ann Parker (photographer) (1934–2022), American photographer and writer
- Ann Parker Bowles (1918–1987), British aristocrat and Girl Guides leader

== See also ==
- Anne Parker (disambiguation)
- Annie Parker, protagonist in film Decoding Annie Parker
