= Larry Parker =

Lawrence or Larry Parker may refer to:

- Larry H. Parker (1948–2024), American personal injury lawyer
- Larry Parker (tennis) (born 1949), American tennis player
- KRS-One (Lawrence Parker, born 1965), American rapper
- Larry Parker (American football) (born 1976), wide receiver in NFL
- Larry Parker (magician) (1929–2021), comic magician

== See also ==
- Frances Lawrence Parker (1906–2002), American geologist and micropaleontologist
- Anthony Lawrence Parker (born 1989), Canadian football wide receiver
