= Alan Parker (disambiguation) =

Alan Parker (1944–2020) was an English film director, producer, writer, and actor.

Alan Parker may also refer to:

- Alan Parker (musician) (born 1944), British guitarist for the band Blue Mink
- Alan G. Parker (born 1965), British music biographer (films and books)
- Alan Parker, alter-ego of British comedian Simon Munnery
  - Alan Parker (radio show), a 1995 radio show featuring the character
  - Alan Parker, Road Warrior, a 1996 radio show featuring the character
- Alan Parker (athlete) (1928–2012), British long-distance runner
- Alan M. Parker (born 1939), British businessman, DFS Galleria
- Alan C. Parker (born 1946), British businessman, chairman of Mothercare, former CEO of Whitbread
- Alan Parker, a character in the Judge Parker comic strip

== See also ==
- C. Allen Parker (born 1955), American business executive and attorney
- Al Parker (disambiguation)
