= Willie Parker (disambiguation) =

Willie Parker (born 1980) is an American football player who was a running back.

Willie Parker may also refer to:

- Willie Parker (offensive lineman) (born 1948), American football player
- Willie Parker (defensive tackle) (1945–2025), American football player
- Willie Parker (physician), American physician

== See also ==
- William Parker (disambiguation)
