= Jeff Parker =

Jeff Parker may refer to:

- Jeff Parker (comics) (born 1966), comic book cartoonist
- Jeff Parker (editorial cartoonist)
- Jeff Parker (ice hockey) (1964–2017)
- Jeff Parker (musician) (born 1967), guitarist for the band Tortoise
- Jeff Parker (writer) (born 1974), American novelist
- Jeffrey A. Parker (1957–2018), American businessman
- Jeff Parker, a professional wrestler known as Scott "Jagged" Parker

== See also ==
- Geoffrey Parker (disambiguation)
