= Hubert Parker (disambiguation) =

Hubert Parker (1883–1966) was an Australian politician.

Hubert Parker may also refer to:

- Hubert Parker, Baron Parker of Waddington (1900–1972), British judge
- Hubert "Buster" Parker, brother of Bonnie Parker of Bonnie and Clyde

== See also ==
- Bert Parker (disambiguation)
