= Samuel Parkes =

Samuel Parkes may refer to:

- Samuel Parkes (chemist) (c. 1759–1825), British manufacturing chemist
- Samuel Parkes (VC) (c. 1815–1864), British soldier and recipient of the Victoria Cross

== See also ==
- Samuel Parks (disambiguation)
- Samuel Parker (disambiguation)
