= Bill Parker =

Bill Parker may refer to:

- Bill Parker (broadcaster) (1928–2019), American broadcaster for WNBF
- Bill Parker (comics) (1911–1963), American comic book writer, created Captain Marvel in 1940
- Bill Parker (inventor), artist and inventor of the plasma lamp
- Bill Parker (Neighbours), fictional character on the Australian soap opera, Neighbours

== See also ==
- Billy Parker (disambiguation)
- William Parker (disambiguation)
