= Pray Anything =

- The Simpsons episode
- Episode no.: Season 14; Episode 10
- Directed by: Mike Frank Polcino
- Written by: Sam O'Neal; Neal Boushell
- Production code: EABF06
- Original air date: February 9, 2003

Guest appearances
- Ken Burns as himself; Lisa Leslie as herself

Episode features
- Chalkboard gag: "SpongeBob is not a contraceptive"
- Couch gag: The Simpsons sit down as normal. A giant baby picks them up and plays with them.
- Commentary: Al Jean; Sam O'Neal; Neal Boushell; Matt Selman; Carolyn Omine; Kevin Curran; Matt Warburton; Mike Frank Polcino

Episode chronology
← Previous "The Strong Arms of the Ma"	Next → "Barting Over"
- The Simpsons season 14

"Pray Anything" is the tenth episode of the fourteenth season of the American animated television series The Simpsons. It originally aired on the Fox network in the United States on February 9, 2003. The episode was written by Sam O'Neal and Neal Boushell and was directed by Mike Frank Polcino.

In the episode, Homer sues the church and ends up receiving the deed to own it. Under his ownership, the church becomes a hangout for townspeople. Filmmaker Ken Burns and basketball player Lisa Leslie appeared as themselves. The episode received mixed reviews.

== Plot ==
At a WNBA game which the Simpson family are attending, the announcer offers a $50,000 prize for successfully shooting a half-court basket. Ned Flanders kneels and prays before shooting the basket, and makes it. He declares he will donate the money, which is then doubled to $100,000 by the Rich Texan, much to Homer's dismay. After Ned's car is blocked from leaving the parking lot, Homer witnesses the Flanders family being allowed to drive the WienerMobile home instead. The following day, Homer asks Ned what his secret is, and Ned replies it is hard work, clean living, and prayer. Since the first two would require effort on his part, Homer focuses on prayer, which he believes to work after a series of minor achievements that he happened to be praying for.

After noticing his excessive praying for a plumber when a water pipe leaks, Marge tells Homer that he should not ask God to do everything for him, which he bluntly refuses to consider, and the Simpson house is eventually destroyed. On a Sunday, Homer is walking towards the church and prays to God for a better house. Not looking where he is going, Homer sprains his leg in a fall and hires a personal injury lawyer to sue the church, believing it to be God's solution to his housing problem. The court finds in Homer's favor and awards him the deed to the church, which he quickly moves the family into. Meanwhile, Reverend Lovejoy sets up a temporary congregation at Barney's Bowlarama, but his first sermon is a disaster and he becomes disheartened enough to abandon Springfield, much to Ned's dismay. Back at the church, Homer holds a rowdy housewarming party that goes on for several days and the church becomes a bar and hangout for the townspeople, where Ned observes that they have violated all Ten Commandments.

As Marge worries that Homer is incurring God's wrath, a rainstorm begins and Homer is struck by lightning in the mouth (God's way of smiting him for his blasphemy, sacrilege and heresy). The town begins to flood, and the townspeople flee to the roof of the church. Just as the townspeople are about to angrily advance on Homer for causing their impending doom, Reverend Lovejoy returns in a helicopter and leads everyone in prayer, asking God to forgive them. The flood subsides, and afterwards Lisa gives logical reasons for the cause of the events that had happened, with the storm and flood caused by bonfire and trees being cut down, though she has no logical answer for why the rain suddenly stopped. The camera then pans to a Heaven scene featuring God, Colonel Sanders and Buddha, the latter having stopped the rain after deciding that the humans had suffered enough.

== Production ==
The show has delved into religious themes many times in its history. In this episode, the theme of prayer is given center stage.

The episode had a freelance pitch. O'Neal and Boushell wanted to ensure they came up with a unique idea that had never been done before, as they knew they were approaching the show's 300th episode. The original pitch was based on an NPR story about the "gospel of prosperity". This episode opens with a WNBA game because many NBA players had turned them down for a guest spot a couple of years before in the episode "Children of a Lesser Clod". The lenticular card of a "vengeful god" and "loving god" was animated by creating two images which cross dissolved with white lines interspersed. Al Jean explained that a valid point made in the episode was why God should care about the average man's first world problems when there are natural and man-made disasters that could use his help. Castellaneta did a longer falling noise at the table read than the one that appeared in the final cut of the episode. Jean explained that due to the loss of Phil Hartman – and therefore Lionel Hutz – it was tough to introduce new lawyers to the show. This episode includes one such attempt. The staff had a fight with the broadcast standards over Homer dancing around the church in his underwear. In regard to the sunset shot, up until this point in the show's history, there was not much graduated shading used because it had to be painstakingly drawn. In contrast, it is very quick and easy using computers, which is why Polcino prefers digital over the hand painted; many more color and shading options are made available.

== Reception ==
=== Viewing figures ===
The episode was watched by 13.40 million viewers, which was the 28th most-watched show that week.

=== Critical response ===
The Orlando Sentinel's Gregory Hardy named it the thirteenth best episode of the show with a sports theme.

Colin Jacobson of DVD Movie Guide said the episode reminded him of the fourth season episode "Homer the Heretic" but was not as good as that episode. He wrote that there were "some amusing moments but doesn't add up to a consistently strong program."

On Four Finger Discount, Guy Davis and Brendan Dando thought the episode "had an interesting premise, just lacked a solid execution", and they felt they had seen similar episodes previously.

Polcino said "Pray Anything" was a "well-written show", and "one of his favorite scripts" as he loves addressing religious themes.

== Cultural references ==
The episode title is a reference to the movie Say Anything..., in which Dan Castellaneta had played a small, uncredited role. When a moisture-damaged wall disintegrates in the Simpson house, the cracks form the shape of one of the Washington Crossing the Delaware paintings. Documentary filmmaker Ken Burns appears in a self-parody role as the presenter of an autobiographical documentary about his own life. The attorney who takes up Homer's injury lawsuit against the church, "Larry H. Lawyer Jr.", is based on Los Angeles attorney Larry H. Parker.
