= Brian Parker (sports agent) =

American sports agent

Brian Parker is an American sports agent.

== Career ==
Parker graduated from the University of Memphis. While enrolled at the University of Memphis, Parker was hired by agents Jimmy Sexton and Kyle Rote Jr. for their Memphis-based Athletic Resource Management, which represented NBA players Scottie Pippen and Horace Grant, among others.

In 1999, Parker moved to the Memphis-based Mid-South Sports Management. He was named managing director at 23, certified as an agent with the NFL Players Association, and represented Mike McKenzie, Deshea Townsend, Matt Stewart, and Wade Smith.

In July 2003, at the start of the NBA free agency signing period, Parker represented Scottie Pippen in the player's final NBA contract negotiation. The Chicago Bulls, Memphis Grizzlies, San Antonio Spurs, and Dallas Mavericks were reportedly interested. Parker arranged sit-down meetings between Pippen and Grizzlies majority owner Michael Heisley and with Bulls representatives two days later. Pippen would sign with Chicago for his final NBA season.

Parker continued his work with the Irvine, California-based Rep 1 Sports. The agency's clients included Wesley Johnson, Blake Bortles, Star Lotulelei, Sean Richardson, Scott Wells, Wade Smith, Evan Dietrich-Smith, and Mose Frazier.

In March 2010, Parker negotiated Wade Smith’s reported four-year, $12 million contract with the Houston Texans, with $6.25 million guaranteed in the first year.

In March 2012, Scott Wells, entering free agency following his contract with the Green Bay Packers, signed a four-year contract with the St. Louis Rams. Parker, Wells’ agent, negotiated a reported $24 million over four years ($13 million guaranteed), with incentives raising it up to $25.5 million.

In 2014, Parker negotiated a four-year contract between Green Bay Packers free agent Evan Dietrich-Smith and the Tampa Bay Buccaneers for a reported $14.25 million, with $7.25 million guaranteed.

Gil Brandt, the former Dallas Cowboys vice president of player personnel, said of Parker, "[He] has some very creative ideas that benefit both player and club in contract negotiations. I'm very, very impressed with the way he does business."

== Personal life ==
Parker married country music artist Jillian Cardarelli on May 15, 2021, in Nashville, Tennessee.

Parker was a childhood friend of the late professional basketball player Lorenzen Wright. Together they were part of the national third-place Amateur Athletic Union summer league basketball team in 1994.

== Philanthropy ==
Parker served on the boards of the Memphis chapter of Big Brothers Big Sisters and Hands On Memphis.
