= Anne Parker =

Anne Parker may refer to:

- Anne Parker (actress), British stage actress
- Anne McHardy Parker (1767–1797), mutineer's wife
- Anne Parker, character in Decoding Annie Parker

== See also ==
- Ann Parker (disambiguation)
