= Stewart Parker (scientist) =

Stewart F Parker
- Education: University of California, Santa Barbara
- Scientific career
- Workplaces: ISIS neutron source University of Glasgow

Stewart F. Parker is a British scientist specialising in vibrational spectroscopy and catalysis. He works at the ISIS neutron source and is an Honorary Professor in the school of Chemistry at the University of Glasgow.

== Career ==
Parker gained his PhD at the University of California, Santa Barbara following this with postdoctoral research at the University of East Anglia. He worked for the Analytical Division of the Sunbury Research Centre before moving to the ISIS Facility in 1993.

He has an Individual Merit award from the Science and Technology Facilities Council, which was renewed in 2019.

== Select publications ==
- Parker, S. F. Horton, K. E. and Tomkinson, J. 1995. The TFXA user guide. Council for the Central Laboratory of the Research Council.
- Mitchell, P. C. H, Parker, S. F., Ramirez-Cuesta, J. and Tomkinson, J. 2005. Vibrational Spectroscopy with Neutrons With Applications in Chemistry, Biology, Materials Science and Catalysis (Series on Neutron Techniques and Applications: Volume 3) doi:10.1142/5628.
- Parker, S. F., Ramirez-Cuesta, A. J., and Daemen, L. 2018. "Vibrational spectroscopy with neutrons: Recent developments", Spectrochimica Acta Part A: Molecular and Biomolecular Spectroscopy 190. 518-523.
- Parker, S. F., Mukhopadhyay, S., Jiménez‐Ruiz, M., and ALbers, P. W. 2019. "Adsorbed States of Hydrogen on Platinum: A New Perspective". Chemistry: A European Journal 25(26), 6496-6499. doi:10.1002/chem.201900351.
