= Shane Parker =

Shane Parker may refer to:

- Shane Parker (ornithologist) (1943–1992), British-Australian museum curator
- Shane Parker (bishop) (born 1958), Canadian Anglican archbishop
- Shane Parker (speedway rider) (born 1970), Australian motorcycle speedway rider
- Shane Parker (footballer) (born 1973), Australian rules footballer
