= List of Harrow Borough F.C. seasons =

This is a list of seasons played by Harrow Borough Football Club in English football, from 1933 (when Roxonian F.C. were first formed) to the present day. It details the club's achievements in major competitions, and the top scorers for each season.

== List ==
| Season | League | | | | | | | | | FA Cup | FA Trophy/FA Amateur Cup | Regional Cups | Top scorer | |
| Season | Division | P | W | D | L | F | A | Pts | Pos | FA Cup | FA Trophy/FA Amateur Cup | Regional Cups | Top scorer | |
Played as Roxonian F.C.
| 1933–34 | HDLD1 | 24 | 18 | 2 | 4 | 101 | 50 | 38 | 2nd | | | | Allday | 20 |
| 1934–35 | SLD2W | 26 | 9 | 4 | 13 | 50 | 67 | 22 | 10th | | | | Ted Bickles | 16 |
| 1935–36 | SLD2W | 24 | 3 | 4 | 17 | 28 | 76 | 10 | 13th | | | | A. Daws | 5 |
| 1936–37 | SLD2W | 26 | 11 | 4 | 11 | 56 | 61 | 26 | 5th | | | | C. Brown | 14 |
| 1937–38 | SLD2W | 26 | 21 | 2 | 3 | 95 | 32 | 44 | 2nd | | | | Lovett & Lavender | 12 |
Name changed to Harrow Town F.C.
| 1938–39 | SLD2W | 26 | 20 | 1 | 5 | 59 | 25 | 41 | 1st | EP | | | R. Lovett | 17 |
Second World War – Played in the West Middlesex Combination and then the Middlesex Senior League.
| 1944–45 | MSLN | 16 | 8 | 2 | 6 | 50 | 36 | 18 | 4th | | | | Gordon Box | 26 |
| 1945–46 | SLCD | 18 | 10 | 1 | 7 | 51 | 40 | 21 | 5th | 2Q | | | | |
| 1946–47 | SLPD | 26 | 13 | 2 | 11 | 62 | 55 | 28 | 7th | 3Q | | | Ron Shaw | 21 |
| 1947–48 | SLPD | 26 | 8 | 5 | 13 | 50 | 68 | 21 | 10th | 2Q | | | George Tyson | 22 |
| 1948–49 | SLPD | 26 | 11 | 4 | 11 | 47 | 57 | 26 | 6th | 1Q | | | Alan Bridges | 48 |
| 1949–50 | SLPD | 26 | 8 | 3 | 15 | 53 | 89 | 19 | 11th | EP | | | Alan Bridges & Alec Bonner | 10 |
| 1950–51 | SLPD | 26 | 6 | 5 | 15 | 38 | 66 | 17 | 12th | EP | | | Bill Lee | 11 |
| 1951–52 | SLPD | 26 | 10 | 6 | 10 | 45 | 60 | 26 | 7th | Pre | | | George Case | 31 |
| 1952–53 | SLPD | 30 | 13 | 2 | 15 | 52 | 57 | 28 | 7th | Pre | | | George Tyson | 18 |
| 1953–54 | SLPD | 30 | 10 | 8 | 12 | 57 | 68 | 28 | 10th | Pre | | | George Case | 17 |
| 1954–55 | SLSS | 30 | 12 | 4 | 14 | 55 | 54 | 28 | 9th | Pre | | | George Case | 15 |
| 1955–56 | SLSS | 28 | 12 | 4 | 12 | 75 | 71 | 28 | 9th | 1Q | | | Tony Zubiena | 19 |
| 1956–57 | SLSS | 26 | 16 | 3 | 7 | 73 | 37 | 35 | 4th | 1Q | | NWMIC Finalists | Phil West | 30 |
| 1957–58 | SLSS | 30 | 22 | 4 | 4 | 94 | 30 | 48 | 2nd | 1Q | | NWMIC Finalists | Ken Aldridge | 32 |
| 1958–59 | Delphian League | 28 | 14 | 7 | 7 | 73 | 40 | 35 | 4th | Pre | | | | |
| 1959–60 | Delphian League | 24 | 13 | 7 | 4 | 52 | 32 | 33 | 3rd | 1Q | | NWMIC Finalists | Alf Willis | 19 |
| 1960–61 | Delphian League | 28 | 12 | 6 | 10 | 65 | 63 | 30 | 6th | 4Q | | | Dave Norman | 24 |
| 1961–62 | Delphian League | 26 | 3 | 7 | 16 | 33 | 62 | 13 | 13th | 2Q | | | Alf Willis | 20 |
| 1962–63 | Delphian League | 12 | 3 | 3 | 6 | 23 | 21 | 9 | Aban | | | | | |
Delphian League abandoned due to severe winter. Split into two leagues in order to complete the season. League then closed and Harrow Town joined the newly formed Athenian League Div Two
| 1962–63 | Delphian League West | 7 | 4 | 0 | 3 | 11 | 10 | 8 | 5th | 2Q | | | Roy Streek | 14 |
| 1963–64 | AL – 2 | 28 | 20 | 2 | 6 | 85 | 42 | 42 | 2nd | 2Q | 2 | | Peter Lavers | 45 |
| 1964–65 | AL – 1 | 30 | 16 | 5 | 9 | 79 | 56 | 37 | 5th | 1Q | | | Peter Lavers | 45 |
| 1965–66 | AL – 1 | 30 | 7 | 5 | 18 | 32 | 71 | 19 | 14th | 2Q | | | Ted Lewis | 10 |
| 1966–67 | AL – 1 | 30 | 5 | 3 | 22 | 37 | 88 | 13 | 16th | 2Q | | | Dennis Smith | 17 |
Changed name to Harrow Borough F.C.
| 1967–68 | AL – 2 | 30 | 12 | 6 | 12 | 41 | 49 | 30 | 10th | 2Q | | | Alan Fine | 17 |
| 1968–69 | AL – 2 | 30 | 5 | 3 | 22 | 45 | 85 | 13 | 16th | 2Q | | | Tommy Johnson | 11 |
| 1969–70 | AL – 2 | 30 | 4 | 8 | 18 | 33 | 67 | 16 | 14th | 1Q | | | Clive Coast & John Eales | 10 |
| 1970–71 | AL – 2 | 30 | 8 | 9 | 13 | 32 | 39 | 25 | 12th | 2Q | | | Tommy Ellerbeck | 11 |
| 1971–72 | AL – 2 | 30 | 7 | 6 | 17 | 27 | 47 | 20 | 13th | 1Q | | | Bob Conroy | 8 |
| 1972–73 | AL – 2 | 26 | 12 | 5 | 9 | 43 | 30 | 29 | 9th | 1Q | | | Joe Kasza | 14 |
| 1973–74 | AL – 2 | 30 | 11 | 9 | 10 | 44 | 37 | 31 | 8th | 3Q | | | Billy Gill | 18 |
| 1974–75 | AL – 2 | 28 | 11 | 5 | 12 | 35 | 37 | 27 | 9th | 2Q | 2Q | | Billy Gill | 19 |
| 1975–76 | IL – 2 | 42 | 15 | 12 | 15 | 71 | 74 | 57 | 9th | Pre | Pre | | Gary Gilbert | 27 |
| 1976–77 | IL – 2 | 42 | 21 | 12 | 9 | 78 | 44 | 75 | 5th | 1Q | 2Q | | John Cerasol | 21 |
| 1977–78 | IL – 1 | 42 | 17 | 10 | 15 | 59 | 54 | 61 | 9th | 1Q | 1R | | Frank Seward | 17 |
| 1978–79 | IL – 1 | 42 | 26 | 8 | 8 | 85 | 49 | 86 | 2nd | 1Q | 1R | MCC Finalists | Peter Sharratt | 42 |
| 1979–80 | ILP | 42 | 17 | 15 | 10 | 64 | 51 | 66 | 8th | 1Q | 3Q | MCC Winners | Peter Sharratt | 30 |
| 1980–81 | ILP | 42 | 16 | 11 | 15 | 57 | 52 | 59 | 9th | 2Q | 3Q | | Dave Pearce | 33 |
| 1981–82 | ILP | 42 | 18 | 13 | 11 | 77 | 55 | 67 | 6th | 4Q | 1Q | | George Duck | 30 |
| 1982–83 | ILP | 42 | 24 | 7 | 11 | 91 | 58 | 79 | 3rd | 2Q | SF | MSC Winners | George Duck | 26 |
| 1983–84 | ILP | 42 | 25 | 13 | 4 | 73 | 42 | 88 | 1st | R2 | 1Q | | George Duck | 20 |
| 1984–85 | ILP | 42 | 18 | 8 | 16 | 70 | 56 | 62 | 8th | 4Q | 3Q | | Laurence Holmes | 13 |
| 1985–86 | ILP | 42 | 21 | 8 | 13 | 76 | 66 | 71 | 5th | 2Q | 1R | | Laurence Holmes | 25 |
| 1986–87 | ILP | 42 | 20 | 10 | 12 | 68 | 44 | 70 | 6th | 1Q | 1R | | Laurence Holmes | 19 |
| 1987–88 | ILP | 42 | 15 | 11 | 16 | 53 | 58 | 56 | 12th | 2Q | 2R | | Mark Adams | 9 |
| 1988–89 | ILP | 42 | 9 | 13 | 20 | 53 | 75 | 40 | 19th | 1Q | 3Q | | Jimmy Bolton | |
| 1989–90 | ILP | 42 | 11 | 10 | 21 | 51 | 79 | 43 | 18th | 1Q | 2R | | | |
| 1990–91 | ILP | 42 | 10 | 8 | 24 | 57 | 84 | 38 | 20th | 1Q | 3Q | | | |
| 1991–92 | ILP | 42 | 11 | 13 | 18 | 58 | 78 | 46 | 18th | 1Q | 2R | | | |
| 1992–93 | ILP | 42 | 16 | 14 | 12 | 59 | 60 | 62 | 8th | 1Q | 3Q | MSC & MCC Winners | | |
| 1993–94 | ILP | 42 | 18 | 11 | 13 | 54 | 56 | 65 | 9th | 4Q | 1R | | | |
| 1994–95 | ILP | 42 | 17 | 6 | 19 | 64 | 67 | 57 | 10th | 1Q | 3Q | | | |
| 1995–96 | ILP | 42 | 19 | 10 | 13 | 70 | 56 | 67 | 9th | 1Q | 2Q | | Mark Xavier | 29 |
| 1996–97 | ILP | 42 | 12 | 14 | 16 | 58 | 62 | 50 | 17th | 1Q | 3Q | HSC Winners | | |
| 1997–98 | ILP | 42 | 15 | 10 | 17 | 60 | 67 | 55 | 12th | 1Q | 3Q | | | |
| 1998–99 | ILP | 42 | 17 | 9 | 16 | 72 | 66 | 60 | 9th | 3Q | 2R | HSC Winners | | |
| 1999–00 | ILP | 42 | 14 | 6 | 22 | 54 | 70 | 48 | 19th | 3Q | 2R | | | |
| 2000–01 | ILP | 41 | 10 | 11 | 20 | 62 | 91 | 41 | 19th | 1R | 3R | MSC Finalists | | |
| 2001–02 | ILP | 42 | 8 | 10 | 24 | 50 | 89 | 34 | 21st | 1Q | 1R | | | |
| 2002–03 | ILP | 46 | 15 | 9 | 22 | 54 | 75 | 54 | 18th | 2Q | R1 | | | |
| 2003–04 | ILP | 46 | 12 | 14 | 20 | 47 | 63 | 50 | 17th | 3Q | R2 | | | |
| 2004–05 | ILP | 42 | 13 | 10 | 19 | 41 | 54 | 49 | 16th | 3Q | 1R | | | |
| 2005–06 | ILP | 42 | 13 | 9 | 20 | 56 | 73 | 48 | 16th | 3Q | 3Q | MCC Winners | Elliot Onochie | 19 |
| 2006–07 | ILP | 42 | 13 | 6 | 23 | 61 | 71 | 45 | 19th | 2Q | 1Q | MCC Winners | James Bent | 19 |
| 2007–08 | ILP | 42 | 15 | 7 | 20 | 61 | 74 | 52 | 16th | 1Q | 1Q | GRMS Winners | James Bent | 11 |
| 2008–09 | ILP | 42 | 14 | 12 | 16 | 56 | 73 | 54 | 14th | 1Qr | 2Q | ILC Finalists | Gary Noel | 18 |
| 2009–10 | ILP | 42 | 13 | 14 | 15 | 66 | 63 | 53 | 14th | 1Qr | 2Qr | | Rocky Baptiste | 22 |
| 2010–11 | ILP | 42 | 22 | 7 | 13 | 77 | 51 | 73 | 5th | 1R | 1Q | ILP Playoff Semi Finalists | Rocky Baptiste | 22 |
| 2011–12 | ILP | 42 | 13 | 8 | 21 | 53 | 70 | 47 | 17th | 2Q | 2Qr | | JJ Bates | 15 |
| 2012–13 | ILP | 42 | 12 | 9 | 21 | 53 | 71 | 45 | 15th | 1QR | 1QR | | TBC | |
| 2013–14 | ILP | 46 | 15 | 13 | 18 | 66 | 72 | 58 | 18th | 1QR | 1QR | | Simeon Akinola | 10 |
| 2014–15 | ILP | 46 | 15 | 8 | 23 | 64 | 77 | 53 | 16th | 4QR | 1QR | MSC & MCC Winners | Marc Charles-Smith | 21 |
| 2015–16 | ILP | 46 | 15 | 9 | 22 | 66 | 80 | 54 | 17th | 1QR | 1QR | | Marc Charles-Smith | 19 |
| 2016–17 | ILP | 46 | 14 | 11 | 21 | 60 | 80 | 53 | 21st | 1R | 3QR | | Ibraham Meite | 17 |
| 2017–18 | ILP | 46 | 19 | 6 | 21 | 69 | 76 | 63 | 12th | 1QR | 1QR | | Kurtis Cumberbatch | 14 |
| 2018–19 | SL Prem South | 42 | 18 | 9 | 15 | 97 | 77 | 63 | 7th | 1QR | 1QR | MSC Finalists | Ryan Moss | 22 |
| 2019–20 | SL Prem South | 34 | 9 | 9 | 16 | 44 | 63 | 36 | Aband | 2QR | 1QR | | George Moore | 9 |
| 2020–21 | SL Prem South | 7 | 1 | 2 | 4 | 11 | 14 | 5 | Aband | 2QR | 3QR | | George Moore | 9 |
| 2021–22 | SL Prem South | 42 | 15 | 7 | 20 | 62 | 77 | 52 | 14th | R1 | R1 | | James Ewington | 32 |
| 2022–23 | SL Prem South | 42 | 9 | 10 | 23 | 44 | 80 | 37 | 19th | 1Q | R4 | MSC Finalists | George Moore | 15 |
| 2023–24 | SL Prem South | 42 | 10 | 9 | 23 | 60 | 97 | 39 | 21st | 1Q | R1 | | Reece Mitchell | 16 |
| 2024–25 | IL South Central | 42 | 14 | 9 | 19 | 56 | 67 | 51 | 14th | PRE | 1Q | | Leo Sery | 11 |

=== Key ===
- P = Played
- W = Games won
- D = Games drawn
- L = Games lost
- F = Goals for
- A = Goals against
- Pts = Points
- Pos = Final position
- ILP = Isthmian League Premier Division
- IL – 1 = Isthmian League Division One
- IL – 2= Isthmian League Division Two
- AL – 1 = Athenian League Div One
- AL – 2 = Athenian League Div Two
- SLSS = Spartan League Senior Section
- SLPD = Spartan League Premier Division
- SLCD = Spartan League Central Division
- SLD2W = Spartan League Division Two West
- HDLD1 = Harrow & District League Div One
- MSC = Middlesex Senior Cup
- MCC = Middlesex Charity Cup
- HSC = Harrow Senior Cup
- NWMIC = NW Middlesex Invitation Cup
- GRMS = George Ruffell Memorial Shield
- Pre = Preliminary Round
- 1Q = First Qualifying Round
- 2Q = Second Qualifying Round
- 3Q = Third Qualifying Round
- 4Q = Fourth Qualifying Round
- R1 = Round 1
- R2 = Round 2
- R3 = Round 3
- R4 = Round 4
- R5 = Round 5
- R6 = Round 6
- SF = Semi-finals
- QF = Quarter-finals
- r = replayed

| Promoted | Relegated | Winners | Runners up | Best Performance |

== Sources ==
- Harrow Borough at the Football Club History Database
- Harrow Town at the Football Club History Database
- 1945-1958 at Nonleaguetables.co.uk
