= Robert Parker =

Robert Parker may refer to:

== Arts and literature ==
- Robert Parker (musician) (1847–1937), New Zealand organist, choirmaster and conductor
- Robert Andrew Parker (1927–2023), American painter and watercolorist
- Robert Parker (singer) (1930–2020), American R&B singer
- Robert B. Parker (1932–2010), author of the Spenser detective novels
- Robert Parker (sound engineer) (1936–2004), Australian sound engineer and broadcaster
- Robert W. Parker (composer) (1960–2020), American composer
- Robert Parker (dancer), British dancer, principal dancer at Birmingham Royal Ballet
- Robert Parker (music producer), electronic musician from Stockholm, Sweden

== Law and politics ==
- Sir Robert Parker, 1st Baronet (c. 1655–1691), English politician; Member of Parliament for Hastings, 1679–1685
- Robert Townley Parker (1793–1879), British Member of Parliament for Preston
- Robert Parker (judge) (1796–1865), lawyer, judge and politician in New Brunswick
- Robert Parker, Baron Parker of Waddington (1857–1918), British law lord
- Robert Hunt Parker (1892–1969), known as R. Hunt Parker, American jurist
- Robert Manley Parker (1937–2020), American judge

== Sports ==
- R. W. Parker (Robert W. Parker Jr., 1912–1984), American football and track coach
- Robert Parker (cricketer) (born 1942), Australian cricketer
- Robert Parker (coach) (1960–2021), American track and field coach
- Robert Parker (American football) (born 1963), American football player
- Robert Parker (water polo) (born 1987), British water polo player
- Col. Robert Parker, ring name of wrestler Robert Fuller

== Other ==
- Robert Parker (minister) (1564–1614), English Puritan scholar and divine
- Robert LeRoy Parker (1866–1908?), birth name of American outlaw Butch Cassidy
- Robert Henry Parker (1932-2016) known as Bob Parker (accounting scholar), British accounting scholar
- Robert A. Parker (born 1936), American astronaut
- Robert Parker (wine critic) (born 1947), American wine critic
- Robert Parker (historian) (born 1950), Wykeham Professor of Ancient History at Oxford University
- Robert Redmayne Parker (born 1954), Bowbearer of the Forest of Bowland
- Robert C. Parker (born 1957), United States Coast Guard officer
- Robert Ladislav Parker, American geophysicist and mathematician
- Robert W. Parker (general), U.S. Air Force general
- Johnson v. Parker defendant, employer of John Casor

== See also ==
- Rob Parker (disambiguation)
- Bobby Parker (disambiguation)
- Bob Parker (disambiguation)
- Bert Parker (disambiguation)
