= Hyde Parker =

Hyde Parker may refer to:

- Sir Hyde Parker, 5th Baronet (1714–1782), British Royal Navy admiral
- Sir Hyde Parker (Royal Navy officer, born 1739) (1739–1807), British Royal Navy admiral, son of the above
- Hyde Parker (Royal Navy officer, born 1784) (1784–1854), British Royal Navy admiral, son of the above
- Sir Hyde Parker, 8th Baronet (1785–1856), British politician
