= Joel Parker =

Joel Parker may refer to:

- Joel Parker (American football) (b. 1952), American football player
- Joel Parker (clergyman) (1799–1873), American Presbyterian clergyman
- Joel Parker (jurist) (1795–1875), American jurist from New Hampshire
- Joel Parker (politician) (1816–1888), American politician for the Democratic Party
