= Simon C. Parker =

British economist

- Born: 1965 (age 60–61)

Academic background
- Education: University of Wales, Cardiff (BSc); Durham University (PhD)
- Thesis: An intergenerational theory of the consumption function (1992)
- Doctoral advisor: John Ashworth

Academic work
- Discipline: Entrepreneurship
- Institutions: Ivey Business School

Simon Charles Parker (born 1965) is a British economist. He is Professor of Entrepreneurship at the Ivey Business School, University of Western Ontario.

Parker obtained a BSc in Economics and Statistics from University of Wales, Cardiff in 1988, and completed his PhD in Economics at Durham University in 1992.

== Selected publications ==
=== Books ===
- Parker, Simon C. (2014). The Economics of Self-Employment and Entrepreneurship (2nd ed.). Cambridge University Press. ISBN 0511185014.
- Parker, Simon C. (2018). The Economics of Entrepreneurship (2nd ed.). Cambridge University Press. ISBN 1107170664.

=== Journal articles ===
- Parker, Simon C. (2005). "The Economics of Entrepreneurship: What we know and what we don't". Foundations and Trends in Entrepreneurship. 1 (1): 1–54. doi:10.1561/0300000001. hdl:10419/20008.
- Parker, Simon C.; Van Praag, C. Mirjam (2006). "Schooling, capital constraints, and entrepreneurial performance: The endogenous triangle". Journal of Business & Economic Statistics. 24 (4): 416–431. doi:10.1198/073500106000000215. hdl:20.500.14721/16079.
- Parker, Simon C. (2011). "Intrapreneurship or entrepreneurship?". Journal of Business Venturing. 26 (1): 19–34. doi:10.1016/j.jbusvent.2009.07.003.
