= Gordon Parker (author) =

British novelist and playwright (born 1940)

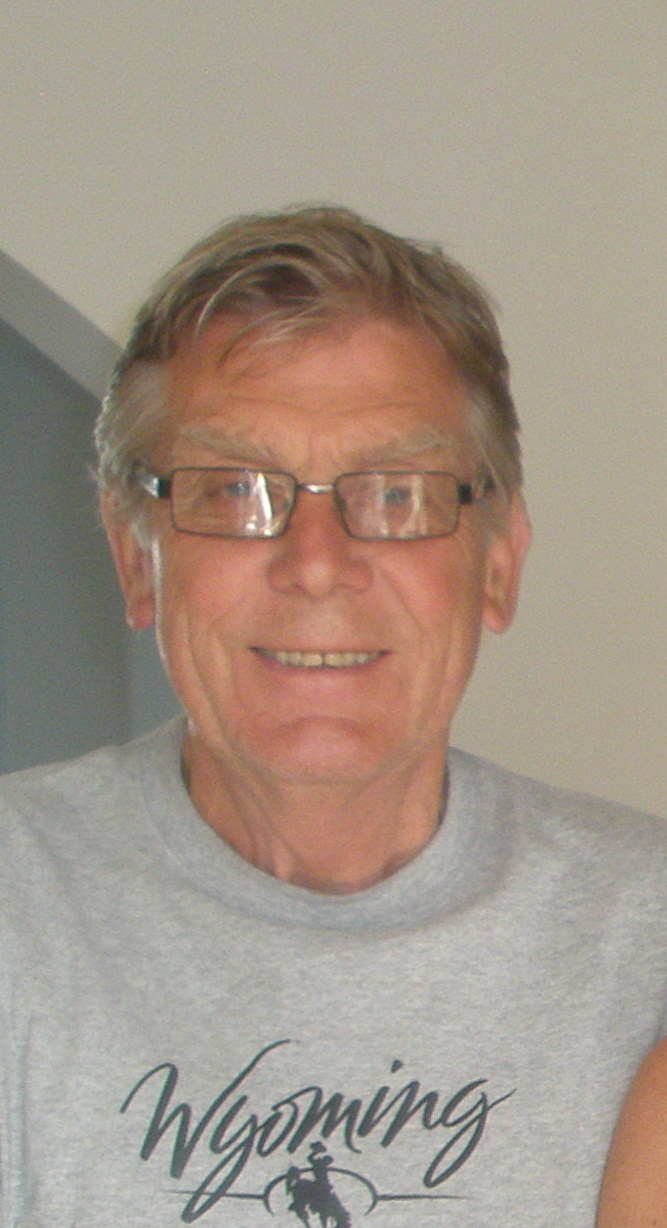
- Born: 28 February 1940 (age 86); Newcastle-upon-Tyne
- Occupations: Novelist, playwright, literary critic
- Writing career
- Notable works: The Darkness of the Morning, Lightning in May, The Pool, The Action of the Tiger, A Waking of Rooks. The Priest and the Whistleblower.

Gordon Parker is a British novelist and playwright. He has been a literary critic for Tyne Tees Television and BBC Radio Newcastle.

== Writing career ==
He began writing short stories for local radio in the early 1970s and completed his first novel "The Darkness of the Morning" in 1975. It became an immediate best seller. Based on an actual local mining disaster in 1862 it attracted praise from the Country's mining community and had a foreword by Sir Derek Ezra, NCB chairman. Following publication it had the unusual accolade of a personal letter from US president Jimmy Carter and also being reproduced as an English reader in Russian schools and serialised in a prominent Russian magazine. It was also published in the Netherlands, well received in Japan and Bulgaria. It was also serialised on BBC Radio Newcastle with an article in the Radio Times by Playwright Tom Haddaway. It was widely reviewed in the UK as a novel that classically illustrated the battle between miners and mine owners in the 19th century. It has been likened to the writings of both A.J.Cronin and Émile Zola. Two radio plays followed: The Seance and God protect the lonely widow which were both broadcast on local BBC radio stations. The latter to commemorate the Trimdon Pit disaster 1882.

His second novel titled Lightning in May was based on the infamous derailing of the "Flying Scotsman" during the 1926 general strike. This was serialised in the Newcastle Journal to commemorate the 50th anniversary of the event. Lord Ted Willis British Television dramatist and playwright, in his foreword, described Parker as "A bright new talent".The novel was widely reviewed His third novel The Pool was a satire about corruption in local government. At the time of writing such corruption was headline news and his novel caused a stir among councils up and down the country. It prompted a meeting arranged by Georgy Andjaparidze, Senior research fellow of the Gorky institute of World literature to discuss critical approaches to Post War English literature. The novel was subscribed in Russia for 500,000 copies

Again, a factual event sparked his next novel, "The Action of the Tiger" his first attempt at a "faction" thriller was also internationally successful. This novel involved the US wartime liberty ship SS Richard Montgomery which in 1944 ran aground and was sunk in the Thames estuary with over 2000 tons of bombs and high explosives on board, and remains there to this day. It was widely reviewed with added interest from the area local to the sunken ship.

After a long lapse due to pressure of his engineering career and now retired, a further novel A Waking of Rooks was published in 2011 as an ebook and is receiving excellent reviews. Described as a rites of passage novel and based in the North East of England in the 1960s it follows the convoluted fortunes of two male teenagers and their path to maturity. His latest novel published in July 2023 is a crime thriller titled 'The Priest and the Whistleblower' and has a fast moving plot with possible drastic world consequences and introducing a tough no nonsense Newcastle based police detective sergeant named Jack Shaftoe.

== Life ==
He has lived in the North East of England since birth but has travelled widely. Educated at Blyth Grammar School and Newcastle Polytechnic he took up an apprenticeship as a marine engineer and later served as an engineer with the Shell Tanker Company before joining the Newcastle office of a Midlands-based engineering company specialising in power station steam raising equipment. He concluded his engineering career as Marketing Manager for Rolls-Royce Nuclear Engineering and then Studsvik, a Swedish company and a world leader specialising in Nuclear Decommissioning.

Gordon Parker is married to Ann and has two daughters Kim and Tracey, four grandsons and six greatgrand children.

== Published works ==
- The Darkness of the Morning Bachman and Turner 1975 (reissued Futura 1976) ISBN 978-0859740203
- Lightning in May Bachman and Turner 1976 (reissued Futura 1977) ISBN 978-0860075226
- The Pool Bachman and Turner 1978 ISBN 978-0859740586
- The Action of the Tiger Macdonald 1981 (reissued Futura 1981) ISBN 978-0708823026
- A Waking of Rooks Kindle (Ebook) 2011 ASIN B005LDNL48
- The Priest and the Whistleblower Burton Mayers Books 2023 ISBN 978-1-7393675
