= Thomas Parker =

Thomas Parker may refer to:

== Politicians ==
- Thomas Parker (died 1570) (c. 1510–1570), for Norwich
- Thomas Parker (died 1558) (by 1519–1558), MP for Cricklade
- Thomas Parker (died 1580) (by 1527–1580), MP for East Grinstead
- Thomas Parker (died 1663) (1595–1663), MP for Hastings, Seaford and Sussex
- Thomas Parker, 1st Earl of Macclesfield (1666–1732), English Whig politician
- Thomas Parker, 3rd Earl of Macclesfield (1723–1795), British peer and politician
- Thomas Parker, 5th Earl of Macclesfield (1763–1850), British peer
- Thomas Parker, 6th Earl of Macclesfield (1811–1896), British peer, Conservative MP for Oxfordshire, 1837–1841
- Thomas Sutherland Parker (1829–1868), physician and political figure in Ontario, Canada
- T. Nelson Parker (1898–1973), American politician from Virginia
- Thomas N. Parker Jr. (1927–2011), member of the Virginia House of Delegates

== Sportspeople ==
- Thomas Parker (rugby league) (1901–1969), Welsh rugby league footballer of the 1920s and 1930s
- Thomas Parker (rower) (1883–?), Australian rower
- Thomas Parker (footballer) (1907–1964), English footballer
- Thomas Parker (cricketer) (1845–1880), English-born New Zealand cricketer

== Others ==
- Thomas Parker (minister) (1595–1677), English nonconforming clergyman and founder of Newbury, Massachusetts
- Thomas Parker (deacon) (1605–1683), founder of Reading, Massachusetts and deacon of the 12th Congregational Church
- Sir Thomas Parker (English judge) (1695–1784), Chief Baron of the Exchequer
- Thomas Parker (soldier, born 1753) (1753–1820), American soldier
- Thomas Parker (engineer) (1843–1916), British railway engineer
- Thomas Parker (inventor) (1843–1915), British electrical engineer and inventor
- Thomas Parker (Maine judge) (1783–1860), judge, writer, philanthropist
- Thomas Jeffery Parker (1850–1897), British zoologist
- Thomas Parker (soldier, born 1822), Union Army soldier and Medal of Honor recipient
- Thomas Lister Parker (1779–1858), English antiquary

== See also ==
- Tom Parker (disambiguation)
- Tommy Parker (disambiguation)
