= Larry H. Parker =

American lawyer, famous for television ads (1948–2024)

Larry Hugh Parker (August 26, 1948 – March 6, 2024) was an American personal injury lawyer. He was well-known through his use of advertising on billboards and television. In 1994, his firm was reported to spend $1 million ($2.17 million in 2025) per year on advertising.

He was caricaturized in the fourteenth season episode "Pray Anything" of The Simpsons as the character Larry H. Lawyer and in the Rocko's Modern Life episode "Fly Burgers" as "Wally H. Barker."
