= Max Parker =

Max Parker may refer to:

- Max Parker (art director) (1882–1964), American art director
- Woodrow McClain Parker (born 1941), American educator, mental health counselor, and author, also known as Max Parker
- Max Parker (footballer) (born 1953), Australian rules footballer
- Max Parker (actor) (born 1992), English actor
