= Friends and Nervous Breakdowns =

Studio album by Weerd Science
- Released: March 22, 2005
- Recorded: Applehead Studios, Woodstock, New York
- Genre: Hip hop
- Length: 60:02
- Label: Equal Vision/Super Rap
- Producer: Michael Birnbaum, Chris Bittner; Dave Parker

Weerd Science chronology
Friends and Nervous Breakdowns (2005)	Sick Kids (2011)

Friends and Nervous Breakdowns is the first/debut album by rapper Weerd Science (real name Josh Eppard) also the former drummer of progressive rock bands 3 and current drummer of Coheed and Cambria. A video was released for "Conspiracy Theories w/ out Mel Gibson".

Professional ratings
Review scores
Source	Rating
AbsolutePunk.net	(74%) link
Alternative Press	link

== Track listing ==
1. "Intro" – 1:55
2. "Conspiracy Theories w/ out Mel Gibson" – 3:40
3. "My War, Your Problem" – 3:34
4. "Ordinary Joe (WCH)" – 4:41
5. "Girl, Your Baby's Worm Food" – 4:29
6. "Blueprint" – 5:44
7. "In a City With No Name" – 4:44
8. "God Bless Pepsi" – 3:38
9. "Fuck You & Your Filthy A&R Dept." – 3:42
10. "Joshua, They're Laughing at You" – 3:23
11. "Super Friends" – 5:23
12. "How to Be a Terrorist" – 4:41
13. "The Sitcom Really Really Isn't All That Real" – 4:26
14. "Methods n Test Tubes" – 4:21
15. "Kill Your Rapper" – 1:41

All songs by Weerd Science.

== Personnel ==
- Josh Eppard – Vocals
- Michael Birnbaum – Recording, engineering, mixing, guitar on Girl, Your Baby's Worm Food
- Chris Bittner – Recording, engineering, mixing, production, bass tracks on My War, Your Problem, Ordinary Joe (WCH), In A City With No Name, Joshua, They're Laughing At You, How To Be A..., and This Sitcom Really Really Isn't All That Real, and music for Ordinary Joe (WCH)
- Danny Illchuck – Recording, engineering, production, all scratches, guest vocals on Super Friends
- Dave Parker – Recording, engineering, production
- Kwame "Gangstophagus" Wiafe-Atenken – spoken word on My War, Your Problem and Fuck You And Your Filthy A&R Dept.
- Michael Fossenkemper – Mastering
- Bill Scoville – Layout and design
