= Samuel Parker (footballer) =

Scottish footballer

Samuel Parker (1872 – unknown) was a Scottish footballer. His regular position was as a forward. He was born in Hurlford. He played for Hurlford, Burnley, and Manchester United.
