= Brian Parker (Australian footballer) =

Australian rules footballer (1944–2001)

Personal information
- Full name: Brian Robert Parker
- Born: 27 October 1944
- Died: 27 February 2001 (aged 56)
- Original team: Clayton
- Height: 183 cm (6 ft 0 in)
- Weight: 87 kg (192 lb)

Playing career^{1}
Years	Club	Games (Goals)
1965	South Melbourne	1 (0)
- ^{1} Playing statistics correct to the end of 1965.

Brian Robert Parker (27 October 1944 – 27 February 2001) was an Australian rules footballer who played for the South Melbourne Football Club in the Victorian Football League (VFL).
