= Barbara Parker =

Barbara Parker may refer to:

- Barbara Parker (writer) (1947–2009), American mystery writer
- Barbara Parker (athlete) (born 1982), English track and field athlete
- Barbara Parker (California politician), city attorney of Oakland, California
- Barbara Parker (Arizona politician), Arizona state representative
- Barbara Parker-Mallowan (1908–1993), English archaeologist, Assyriologist, and epigraphist
