= Samuel Parks =

Samuel or Sam Parks may refer to:

- Sam Parks Jr. (1909–1997), American golfer
- Samuel C. Parks (1820–1917), American lawyer and jurist
- Samuel Parks, character in The $5,000,000 Counterfeiting Plot

== See also ==
- Samuel Parkes (disambiguation)
