= Joe Parker (athletic director) =

- Occupation: Assistant Athletic Director
- Spouse: Jen

Joe Parker is the deputy athletic director and Chief Operating Officer at the University of Iowa.

== College ==
Parker attended the University of Michigan where he was a three-time All-American swimmer, earning a bachelor's degree in economics. He later earned a master's degree in business administration from Texas.

== Career ==
At Texas, Parker began his in career in the athletic department as a development manager. He also worked at Washington State, Oklahoma, as the deputy athletic director at Texas Tech, and as senior associate A.D. at Michigan.

Parker became athletic director at Colorado State University on March 17, 2015, as the permanent replacement of Jack Graham following a national search.

CSU president Amy Parsons replaced Parker with John Weber as athletic director in February 2024. A few days later, Parker was hired by Iowa.

== Family ==
Parker and wife Jen have two grown children, Emma and Will.

== See also ==
List of NCAA Division I athletic directors
