= Paul Parker =

Paul Parker may refer to:

- Paul B. Parker (1898–?), American football and basketball coach
- Paul Parker (cricketer) (born 1956), English schoolmaster and former cricketer
- Paul Parker (footballer) (born 1964), retired English footballer
- Paul Parker (singer) (living), American disco singer
