= Ken Parker =

Ken or Kenneth Parker may refer to:

- Ken Parker (musician) (1948–2025), Jamaican musician
- Ken Parker (guitar maker) (1952–2025), American luthier and founder of Parker Guitars
- Ken Parker (comics), Italian comic book character
- Kenneth Parker (judge) (born 1945), English judge
- Kenneth Parker (cricketer) (born 1945), New Zealand cricketer
- Kenneth L. Parker (born 1972), American lawyer
- Kenneth Parker (1959–1976), victim of serial killer John Wayne Gacy

== See also ==
- Kenny Parker (born 1946), American football defensive back
