= Bert Parke =

Australian rules footballer

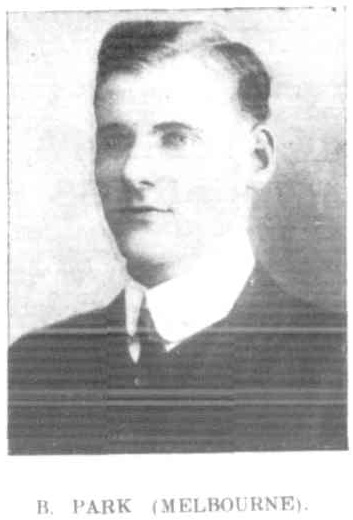
- Parke in 1907

Personal information
- Full name: Hubert Norman Maxwell Parke
- Born: 21 April 1886; Wandong, Victoria
- Died: 24 April 1967 (aged 81); Bairnsdale, Victoria
- Original team: University High School
- Height: 179 cm (5 ft 10 in)
- Weight: 71 kg (157 lb)
- Position: Defender

Playing career^{1}
Years	Club	Games (Goals)
1905, 1913	Carlton	21 (0)
1907–1910, 1912	Melbourne	30 (0)
Total		51 (0)
- ^{1} Playing statistics correct to the end of 1912.

Hubert Norman Maxwell Parke (21 April 1886 – 24 April 1967) was an Australian rules footballer who played for the Carlton Football Club and Melbourne Football Club in the Victorian Football League (VFL).
