= Rob Parker =

Rob Parker may refer to:

- Rob Parker (councillor) (1947–2023), British local politician
- Rob Parker (sports journalist) (born 1964), American sports journalist
- Rob Parker (rugby league) (born 1981), English rugby league footballer
- Rob Parker (Canadian politician) (1943–2016), Progressive Conservative party member of the Canadian House of Commons

== See also ==
- Robert Parker (disambiguation)
- Bob Parker (disambiguation)
