= Isaac Parker =

Isaac Parker may refer to:

- Isaac C. Parker (1838–1896), also known as “Hanging Judge” Parker, American politician and jurist in Missouri and in Arkansas
- Isaac Parker (Massachusetts judge) (1768–1830), U.S. representative from Massachusetts
- Isaac T. Parker (1849–1911), American politician, lieutenant governor of Delaware
- Isaac Parker (Texas politician) (1793–1883), Republic of Texas and state senator, for Twenty-first Texas Legislature
