= Julia Parker =

Julia Parker may refer to:

- Julia Parker (astrologer) (born 1932), British astrologer
- Julia F. Parker (born 1928), Pomo-Miwok basket weaver from California
