= Peter Parker (disambiguation) =

Peter Parker is the secret identity of the character Spider-Man.

Peter Parker may also refer to:

== Fictional characters ==
- Other versions of the main Spider-Man character; see Alternative versions of Spider-Man
  - Peter Parker (2002 film series character), a character portrayed by Tobey Maguire in Sam Raimi's Spider-Man series
  - Peter Parker (The Amazing Spider-Man film series), a character portrayed by Andrew Garfield in The Amazing Spider-Man film series
  - Peter Parker (Marvel Cinematic Universe), a character portrayed by Tom Holland in the Marvel Cinematic Universe
- Peter Parker, the grandson of Peter's Pocket Grandpa, a character in The Dandy

== People ==
- Sir Peter Parker, 1st Baronet (1721–1811), British Admiral and Member of Parliament, friend and patron of Admiral Nelson
- Sir Peter Parker, 2nd Baronet (1785–1814), English naval officer
- Peter Parker (physician) (1804–1888), first Protestant medical missionary to China
- Peter Parker (British businessman) (1924–2002), chairman of the British Railways Board, 1976–1983
- Peter Parker (author) (born 1954), British biographer and journalist
- Peter Parker (umpire) (born 1959), Australian cricket umpire
- Pete Parker (1895–1991), Canadian radio announcer

== Other uses ==
- Peter Parker: Spider-Man, multiple comic book series
- Peter Parker House

== See also ==
- Spider-Man (disambiguation)
