= Gordon R. Parker =

Gordon R. Parker is a business executive notable for leading the Gold Fields unit of Toronto, Canada based Iamgold. He was chairman of Newmont which was a firm involved with exploring, acquiring, and managing gold metals. Parker is a director at corporations including Caterpillar; Gold Fields and Phelps Dodge Corporation. Parker has been a director of Caterpillar since 1995. In 1988, when Parker was chairman and chief executive officer of Newmont Corporation, he was 52 years old.
