= Stuart Parker =

Stuart Parker may refer to:

- Stuart Parker (politician) (born 1972), former leader of the Green Party in British Columbia, Canada
- Stuart Parker (footballer, born 1954), English football manager and former footballer
- Stuart Parker (footballer, born 1963), English football goalkeeper who played for Wrexham
- Stuart Parker (tennis) (born 1997), British tennis player
- Stuart Parker (Neighbours), a fictional character from the Australian soap opera Neighbours
- Stuart Parker, CEO of USAA (United Services Automobile Association)
