= Bob Parker =

Bob Parker may refer to:

- Bob Parker (footballer) (born 1935), English professional footballer
- Bob Parker (mayor) (born 1953), New Zealand television host and mayor
- Bob Parker (rower) (1934–2009), New Zealand rower
- Bob Parker (accounting scholar) (1932–2016), British accounting scholar

== See also ==
- Bobby Parker (disambiguation)
- Rob Parker (disambiguation)
- Robert Parker (disambiguation)
