= Andrew Park (theatre director) =

Andrew Park born in Lafayette, Indiana is an American Theatre Director and puppeteer. Park served as the Artistic Director of both the John G. Shedd Aquarium and Chicago's Quest Theatre Ensemble prior to agreeing to become Artistic Director of the Nebraska Repertory Theatre in January 2017.

== Career ==
=== Education and early life ===
Park developed a passion for acting and directing while attending Jefferson High School in Lafayette, Indiana. After graduating, Park attended Indiana State University (ISU) to pursue a degree in theater. While still a student at ISU, he became the Artistic Director for the historic Showboat Becky Thatcher in Marietta, Ohio. He directed multiple shows including The Fantasticks and Barry Manilow's obscure musical, The Drunkard. The Showboat also produced his Stephen Foster and George M. Cohan Tribute, Red, White and Becky as part of their 2000 summer season. Original works have become a trademark of Park's work.

=== Professional career ===
Park left the Showboat Becky Thatcher in 2000 to pursue his MFA in Directing and Dramaturgy at the Chicago College of Performing Arts at Roosevelt University. During the summer of 2001, Park relocated to Glover, Vermont where he worked with Peter Schumann and the historic Bread and Puppet Theatre. He returned to Chicago to complete his MFA.

In Chicago, Park created new works with multiple companies as well as directing book shows and musicals. He received a Joseph Jefferson Awards Nomination for his original production Seashore with TriArts, Inc. in 2002 and became the founding Artistic Director of Chicago's Quest Theatre Ensemble in the same year. Quest's first production, Blue Nativity has toured Chicago and other Midwest venues annually since 2002. In 2007, Blue Nativity toured Germany. Park has created over a dozen new works with Quest and received a Jeff Nomination for his original production of The People's History of the United States. Quest served as the premier free theatre in Chicago, providing the community with access to professional theatre and art that would otherwise be inaccessible - earning several awards and widespread recognition along the way.

Park also created a spectacle for the Lollapalooza music festival in 2005 and directed Circus Crashers at The Actor's Gym in Evanston, Illinois. In 2006, Park directed Cirque Shanghai at Chicago's Pepsi Skyline Stage at Navy Pier and a new production in the Cirque Shanghai franchise, Bai Xi in 2007. After its run at the Pepsi Skyline stage, Bai Xi enjoyed a two-month run at the Tropicana Casino and Resort Atlantic City.

Park left Cirque Shanghai in 2007 to become the Artistic Director of Chicago's John G. Shedd Aquarium. He conceived and served as the Production Artistic Director for Shedd's new multispecies animal attraction, Fantasea, which opened October 16, 2009.

In 2016, he became the Artistic Director of the Nebraska Repertory Theatre (NRT) in Lincoln, Nebraska, following the company's return from hiatus that began in 2014. NRT is the only professional repertory theatre in Nebraska and is attached to the University of Lincoln - Nebraska (ULN) where he will also join the faculty in the Johnny Carson School of Theatre and Film. Park's tenure with NRT began in January, 2017.

Over the course of an award-winning career spanning nearly two decades, Park has written over ten full length musicals in collaboration with composer and fellow Quest Ensemble member Scott Lamps.

== Sources ==
Wedding, Rachel. "Student Director identifies with 'Pippin.' Tribune-Star 25 Feb. 2000.

Cartmell, Connie. "Becky turns 25 in Marietta". The Marietta Times 22 June 2000.

Shields, Becky. "Red, White & Becky: Musical kicks off summer show season aboard Becky Thatcher". Free Time: Mid-Ohio Valley Guide to Arts & Entertainment 23 June 2000.

Vanasco, Jennifer. "Seashore: Performing Arts Review". Chicago Reader 2 May 2002.

Moe, Mechelle. "Circle Leads Non-Equity Jeff Nominations". Performink 25 April 2003.

Ingram, Bruce. "Quest seeks 'Blue' Christmas". Pioneer Press 27 Nov. 2003.

Fellers, Li. "Puppets bring joyful tidings: A theater ensemble's free Nativity shows let audiences take a fresh look at a timeless story". Chicago Tribune 5 Dec. 2003.

Hochman, Steve. "A festival of family values". Los Angeles Times 19 June 2005.

Davenport, Misha. "Quest takes unique trip to 'Oz.' Chicago Sun-Times 2 Sept. 2005.

Helbig, Jack. "Circus Crashers: Performing Arts Review". Chicago Reader 16 March 2006.

Weiss, Hedy. "Cirque Shanghai shows big improvements; Short acts with fleet, strong, likable performers". Chicago Sun-Times 8 June 2007.

Posnak, Sandy. "'Shanghai' Heights: 'Cirque Shanghai: Bai Xi' twists, turns and swings at Tropicana". Atlantic City Weekly 20 Sept. 2007.

Weiss, Hedy. "Jeff Awards Announces 2009 Non-Equity Nominations". Chicago Sun-Times 29 April 2009.

Jones, Chris. "Splashy, new 'Fantasea' is leaps beyond the old Shedd Aquarium". Chicago Tribune 25 Sept. 2009.
