= Steve Parker =

Steve Parker may refer to:

- Steve Parker (artist), multi-disciplinary artist
- Steve Parker (defensive end, born 1956), American football player with the New Orleans Saints
- Steve Parker (defensive end, born 1959), American football player with the Baltimore/Indianapolis Colts
- Steve Parker (Neighbours), fictional character from the Australian soap opera Neighbours
- Steve Parker (writer) (born 1952), British science writer

== See also ==
- Steven Parker (disambiguation)
- Stephen Parker (disambiguation)
