= Eric Parker =

Eric Parker may refer to:

- Eric Parker (illustrator) (1898–1974), British illustrator
- Eric Parker (American football) (born 1979), American football coach
