= Billy Parker =

Billy Parker may refer to:

- Billy Parker (gridiron football) (born 1981), Arena Football League & Canadian Football League defensive specialist
- Billy Parker (baseball) (1942–2003), American professional baseball infielder
- Billy Parker (singer) (1937–2026), American DJ and country music singer
- Billy Parker (racing driver) (born 1977), NASCAR Busch Series driver

== See also ==
- Bill Parker (disambiguation)
- William Parker (disambiguation)
