= Alice Parker (disambiguation) =

Alice Parker may refer to:

- Alice Parker (1925–2023), American composer, arranger, conductor, and teacher
- Alice Parker (Salem witch trials), executed in 1692
- Alice C. Parker, American electrical engineer
- Alice H. Parker (1895–1920), African American inventor
- Alice Parker Lesser (1863–1939), American lawyer, suffragist, and clubwoman

== See also ==
- Alyce Parker (born 2000), Australian rules footballer
