= Timothy Parker =

Timothy Parker may refer to:

- Timothy Parker (puzzle designer) (born 1960)
- Timothy Britten Parker (born 1962), American stage, film, and television actor
- Gift of Gab (rapper) (1970–2021, Timothy Jerome Parker), American rapper
- Tim Parker (businessman) (born 1955), British businessman
- Tim Parker (soccer) (born 1993), American soccer player
