= Geoffrey Parker =

Geoffrey Parker may refer to:

- Geoff Parker (born 1944), British professor of biology
- Geoffrey Parker (historian) (born 1943), British historian
- Geoff Parker (cricketer) (born 1968), Australian cricketer
- Geoffrey G. Parker (born 1963), American professor of management science

== See also ==
- Jeff Parker (disambiguation)
