= Andrew Park (poet) =

Scottish poet

Andrew Park (7 March 1807 – 27 December 1863) was a Scottish poet.

== Life ==
Park was born in Renfrew on 7 March 1807; his parents, James and Bridget Park, died when he was young, and he was looked after by an elderly aunt. He was educated in the parish school and at the University of Glasgow, and he entered in his fifteenth year a commission warehouse in Paisley. Aged about twenty he became a salesman in a hat manufactory in Glasgow, and there he shortly afterwards started in business for himself. Unsuccessful in this venture, he for a time tempted fortune in London as a man of letters, but he returned to Glasgow in 1841, and, buying the book stock of Dugald Moore (1805–1841), made another fruitless experiment in business. Thenceforth he devoted himself mainly to literature. In 1856 he made an oriental tour, publishing the following year Egypt and the East.

Park became impoverished, and towards the end of his life was often seen at the Whitebait Inn, which was popular with singers and composers, in St Enoch's Wynd, Glasgow. He died in Glasgow on 27 December 1863, and was buried at Paisley cemetery, where a monument, consisting of a bronze bust on a granite pedestal, was erected to his memory in 1867.

== Works ==
Park, while a lad in Paisley, published a sonnet sequence, The Vision of Mankind. In 1834 appeared The Bridegroom and the Bride, and other poems, which enhanced his reputation.

In 1843, under the pseudonym "James Wilson, druggist, Paisley", he published "Silent Love", a graceful and effective poem, which was reissued in 1845, with illustrations by Joseph Noel Paton. The poem was translated into French by the Chevalier de Chatelain, and was very popular in America. "Veritas", a poem which appeared in 1849, is autobiographical in character.

He was popular with the public as a writer of many patriotic and sentimental songs. A collective edition of Park's works, with a preface describing a dream of the muses, was published in London in 1854. Several of Park's lyrics were set to music by Daniel Auber, Gaetano Donizetti and others.
