= Stephen Parker =

Stephen Parker may refer to:

- Stephen Parker (academic), Vice-Chancellor of the University of Canberra
- Stephen Parker (American football) (born 1984), American football offensive guard
- Stephen Parker (senior) (c.1790–c.1880), early settler of Western Australia; see Stephen Stanley Parker
- Stephen Henry Parker (1846–1927), Q.C., M.L.C., son of Stephen Stanley Parker
- Stephen Stanley Parker (1817–1904), J.P., M.L.C., son of Stephen Parker (senior)
- Stephen Parker, actor in Teenage Monster
- Stephen Parker, Head of Post Office Application Support, Fujitsu; a witness in cases related to the British Post Office scandal.

== See also ==
- Steven Parker (disambiguation)
- Steve Parker (disambiguation)
