= Melonie Parker =

American businesswoman

Melonie Parker is an American businesswoman and the Vice-President of Googler Engagement at Google in Silicon Valley. Prior to Google, she has held professional careers at Lockheed Martin and Sandia National Laboratories.

== Early life and education ==
In Melonie Parker's hometown of High Point, North Carolina, she was raised by her mother, High Point's first black bank teller, and her father, employed as a factory worker in a primarily black, middle class neighborhood along with her brother. As a first generation college student, she became the first in her family to enter corporate America. She earned her Bachelor of Arts in Mass Communications from Hampton University in 1988. Parker continued her education at Villanova University where she completed a Master’s degree in Human Resources.

== Career ==
After completing her education, Parker began her career at Lockheed Martin, where she participated in the company's Executive Assessment and Development Program, graduating from the program in 2012. Her career with Lockheed Martin spanned over 17 years. Parker held several positions at Lockheed Martin, including roles in staffing, EEO/Affirmative Action, and benefits, which prepared her for future roles in diversity and human resources management.

Following her time at Lockheed Martin, Parker transitioned to Sandia National Laboratories, where she held the position of Vice President of Human Resources and Communications. Here, she led initiatives to improve employee engagement and foster inclusive work environments, managing Sandia’s HR and communications strategies, media relations, and internal communications.

In 2017, Parker joined Google, taking on the role of Chief Diversity Officer, succeeding Danielle Brown. She has since led DEI initiatives across the company, with a particular focus on transparency, data-driven strategies, and improving workforce representation. Under her leadership, Google became one of the first tech companies to publish a Diversity Annual Report. She introduced Google’s Self-ID program, enabling employees to voluntarily identify race, gender identity, and disability status, which helps track workforce representation. She has also implemented programs to address attrition rates among underrepresented employees, especially Black and Latin employees, reducing turnover through improved support and resource access. Parker advocated for the publication of Google’s diversity reports to track progress and identify areas for improvement.

== Professional involvement ==
Parker was awarded the HR Professional of the year in 2016 by the New Mexico Society of Human Resource Management and received a Special Recognition Award in 2014 at the Women of Color Stem Awards. Parker collaborates with Google’s Black Leadership Advisory Group and the Black Googler Network to support Black employees’ career development. Parker has led Google’s efforts since 2017 to enhance workplace diversity, significantly increasing Black and Latino hires in the U.S. and boosting the representation of women in global leadership roles. Parker also engages in community outreach programs that emphasize the importance of mentorship and education for underrepresented youth.
