= Marion Parker (architect) =

American architect

- Born: Marion Parker; 1873; New Hampshire
- Died: 1935 (aged 62); California
- Education: University of Michigan
- Occupation: Architect

Marion Parker (1873–1935) (Note: sources vary on her middle name: Ann in Allaback, Alice in Conforti, and Sarah in Barry; Allaback estimated she was born in New Hampshire in c.1875, while the archives says Massachusetts in 1873, but went to school in New Hampshire) was the first female graduate in the College of Engineering and Architecture of the University of Michigan, worked with Purcell & Elmslie Architects, and established her own practice.

== Biography ==
Marion Parker was the first female graduate in the College of Engineering and Architecture of the University of Michigan in 1895; the university awards two female students annually to honor her (at least in the mid-1970s). After graduating she worked on skyscrapers in New York City.

Parker worked for William Gray Purcell and George Fieck in their Minneapolis office becoming their first drafter in 1908 and by 1912 became an important member in the small firm. She produced working drawings for leaded glass panels and other craft items.

Established in 1909, Purcell & Elmslie has been described as one of the most prolific of the Prairie School. After adding George Grant Elmslie as partner in 1909, the firm dissolved in 1921.

However, Parker left in 1919 to start her own office.

In addition to architecture, Parker was a craftswoman. A member of the Minneapolis Arts and Crafts Society, she was also worked in textiles, especially rugs in the early 1900s; was a charter member of the chalk and chisel club; and garnered an exhibit prize in 1914.

In retirement she moved to Luguna Beach and opened an arts and crafts shop, named "The Home-Spun Shop". Located in an arts colony she participated in Summer art fairs. While travelling to visit Purcell, she died of a heart attack.

Parker's collection is at the Northwest Architectural Archives, University of Minnesota Libraries, as are Purcell's papers.

== Works ==
- 1912 - Charles I. Buxton Bungalow (with Purcell), Owatonna, Minnesota
- c.1912 - Business Women's Dormitory (for Gratia Countryman), Minneapolis, Minnesota
- 1919 - Business Women's Club of Minneapolis (proposal)
- 1919 - Residence of J. S. Ulland(with Purcell & Elmslie), Fergus Falls, Minnesota
- c.1920 - Frank P. Stower House, Fort Collins, Colorado
