= Wade Smith =

American football player (born 1981)

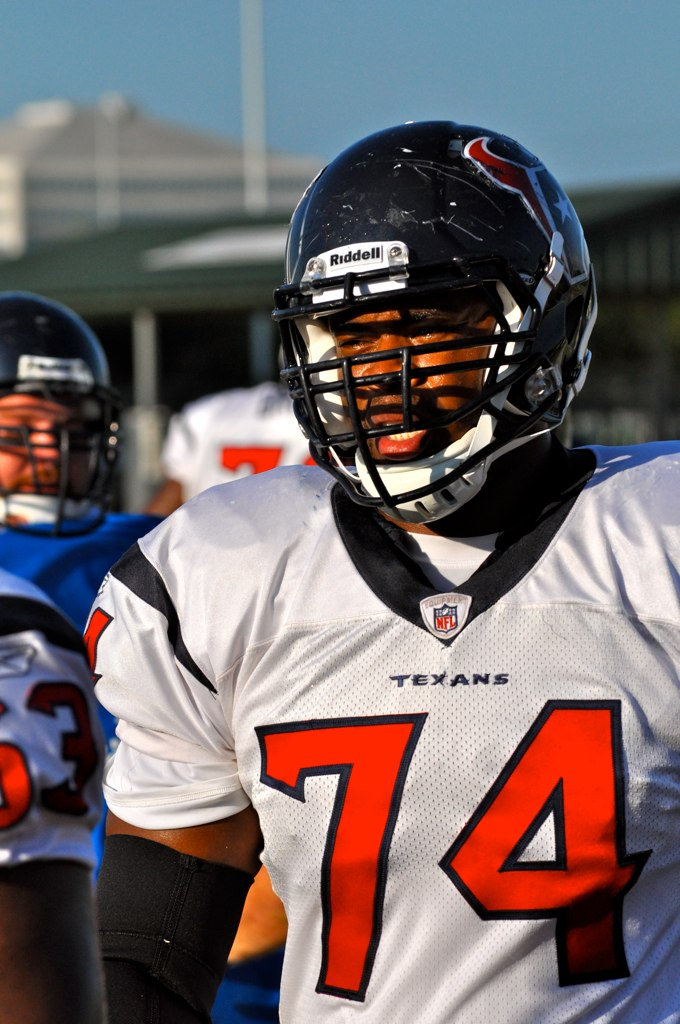
- Smith with the Texans in 2010

No. 74, 71, 73
- Position: Offensive lineman

Personal information
- Born: April 26, 1981 (age 45); Dallas, Texas, U.S.
- Listed height: 6 ft 4 in (1.93 m)
- Listed weight: 295 lb (134 kg)

Career information
- High school: Lake Highlands (Dallas)
- College: Memphis
- NFL draft: 2003: 3rd round, 78th overall pick

Career history
- Miami Dolphins (2003–2006); New York Jets (2006–2007); Kansas City Chiefs (2008–2009); Houston Texans (2010–2013); Seattle Seahawks (2014)*; Philadelphia Eagles (2014)
- * Offseason or practice squad member only

Awards and highlights
- Pro Bowl (2012); PFWA All-Rookie Team (2003); Second-team All-Conference USA (2002)

Career NFL statistics
- Games played: 143
- Games started: 98
- Fumble recoveries: 3
- Total touchdowns: 1
- Stats at Pro Football Reference

Wade Leon Smith (born April 26, 1981) is an American former professional football player who was an offensive tackle in the National Football League (NFL). He played college football for the Memphis Tigers, and was selected by the Miami Dolphins in the third round of the 2003 NFL draft. Smith was also a member of the New York Jets, Kansas City Chiefs, Houston Texans, Seattle Seahawks, and Philadelphia Eagles.

== College career ==
He was a four-year letterman and two-year starting left tackle as a senior and was named a second-team All-Conference USA selection. He was formerly used at tight end and caught five passes for 25 yards as a sophomore.

== Professional career ==
Pre-draft measurables
Height	Weight	Arm length	Hand span	40-yard dash	10-yard split	20-yard split	20-yard shuttle	Three-cone drill	Vertical jump	Broad jump	Bench press
6 ft 4 in (1.93 m)	296 lb (134 kg)	32 5/8 in (0.83 m)	9 5/8 in (0.24 m)	5.17 s	1.69 s	2.94 s	4.75 s	7.62 s	32 1/2 in (0.83 m)	9 ft 6 in (2.90 m)	24 reps
All values from NFL Combine.

Smith was ranked fifth among offensive guard prospects and was projected a fourth round in the 2003 NFL draft.

=== Houston Texans ===
In the October 16, 2011 away game match-up between the Texans and Ravens, Smith recovered a loose ball to score the first touchdown scored by an offensive lineman in Texans history.

Smith was selected to the NFL Pro Bowl AFC Team in 2012 for the first time in his career. He joined 8 of his Houston Texans teammates in Hawaii in his debut.

=== Seattle Seahawks ===
Smith signed with the Seattle Seahawks on August 4, 2014. The Seahawks released Smith on August 25, 2014.

=== Philadelphia Eagles ===
Smith signed with the Philadelphia Eagles on September 9, 2014. He was released on October 14, 2014.
