= Scott Parker (disambiguation) =

Scott Parker (born 1980) is an English football manager and former footballer.

Scott Parker may also refer to:

- Scott Parker (ice hockey) (born 1978), retired American ice hockey right winger
- Scott Parker (motorcyclist) (born 1961), American motorcycle dirt track racer
- Scott Parker (wrestler), one half of the professional wrestling tag team 3.0
