= Albert Parker (footballer) =

English footballer

Personal information
- Full name: Albert Edward Parker
- Date of birth: 13 September 1927
- Place of birth: Liverpool, England
- Date of death: 29 October 2005 (aged 78)
- Place of death: Wrexham, Wales
- Position: Defender

Youth career
- Everton

Senior career*
Years	Team	Apps	(Gls)
- South Liverpool
1948–1951	Crewe Alexandra	113	(0)
1951–1959	Wrexham	216	(1)
- Holywell Town
- * Club domestic league appearances and goals

Albert Edward Parker (13 September 1927 – 29 October 2005) was an English footballer who played as a defender. He made a total of 329 appearances in the English football league with Crewe Alexandra and Wrexham.

== Career ==
Parker started out as a schoolboy for Everton before moving to South Liverpool before the Second World War.

After the Second World War, Parker moved to Crewe Alexandra, making over 100 appearances in 3 years at the club.

In 1951, he moved to Wrexham where he made over 200 league appearances in 8 years. He scored 1 goal for Wrexham, a 60-yarder which bounced over the goalkeeper in a home match against Workington, which is the record for the longest goal scored at the Racecourse Ground.

After leaving Wrexham he moved to Holywell Town.

Post playing-career, Parker worked for Wrexham as a groundsman and a gatesman, and took up refereeing.
