= Andrew Parker =

Andrew Parker may refer to:

- Andrew Parker (politician) (1805–1864), U.S. Representative from Pennsylvania, 1851–1853
- Andrew Parker (zoologist) (born 1967), Australian zoologist
- Andrew Parker (hurdler) (born 1965), Jamaican Olympic hurdler
- Andrew Parker, Baron Parker of Minsmere (born 1962), British counter-espionage officer

== See also ==
- Andrew Parker Bowles (born 1939), retired English military officer, first husband of the Duchess of Cornwall
- Andy Parker (disambiguation)
