= Joseph Parker (biologist) =

Welsh evolutionary biologist

- Born: 1979 or 1980; Swansea, Wales
- Education: Imperial College London (BSc); University of Cambridge (PhD)
- Awards: MacArthur Fellowship
- Scientific career
- Fields: Evolutionary biology
- Institutions: California Institute of Technology

Joseph Parker (born 1979 or 1980) is a Welsh evolutionary biologist. He is the director of the Center for Evolutionary Science at the California Institute of Technology, where he is a professor. He studies symbiosis in rove beetles. In 2024, he was named a MacArthur Fellow.

== Biography ==
Parker was born and raised in Swansea, Wales. In 2001, he graduated from Imperial College London with a BSc. He received his PhD from the University of Cambridge in 2005. He was a postdoctoral fellow at Columbia University from 2008 to 2016. He was an assistant professor at the California Institute of Technology from 2017 to 2024 before being promoted to full professor in 2025.

== Selected publications ==
- Parker, J. (2024). Symbiosis: Did Bacteria Bias the Beetle Big Bang?. Current Biology 34(8): R323–25. https://doi.org/10.1016/j.cub.2024.03.009.
- Parker, J. (2022). The Bank Most Tangled [Book Review]. Current Biology 32(24): R1328–30. https://doi.org/10.1016/j.cub.2022.10.023.
- Parker, J. (2022). Interactions Between Insect Species: Their Evolution and Mechanistic Architecture. Current Opinion in Insect Science 53(October): Art. No. 100963. https://doi.org/10.1016/j.cois.2022.100963.
