= David Parker (climatologist) =

British climatologist

David Parker a British climatologist, currently head of climate monitoring at the Hadley Centre, Exeter, England.

He has published extensively on the land and marine temperature record and its consistency. In 2002, he was an organiser of a "Workshop on Advances in the Use of Historical Marine Climate Data".

In 2004, he has published a paper in the journal Nature, showing that the urban heat island effect has not affected the historical temperature record. In this article, Parker shares his observations of the minimum temperature over 24 hours worldwide since 1950 that were expressed as anomalies. Also it includes his reasoning to why urbanization has not systematically exaggerated the observed global warming trends in minimum temperature. He further goes on to mention how the criterion for “calm” was changed while the global trend for minimum temperature remained unchanged. From his analysis he finds that windy and calm nights warmed at the same rate. Both the windy and calm increased at a rate of (0.16 + 0.03 C). He compares his small sample of 26 stations in North America and Siberia with global trends from 1950 to 1953, covering over 5,000 stations. Estimates of recent global warming, supported by Parker’s analysis shows that urban warming has not introduced significant biases. “The reality and magnitude of global-scale warming is supported by the near-equality of temperature trends on windy nights with trends based on all data.” (Parker) This paper has been commented on by Roger Pielke, Sr., et al.
