= Brad Parker =

Brad Parker may refer to:

- Brad Parker (soccer) (born 1980), Canadian soccer player
- Brad Parker (artist) (born 1961), American cartoonist and painter
- Brad Parker (rugby league) (born 1997), Australian rugby league footballer
- Brad Parker, director of the 2012 film Chernobyl Diaries

== See also ==
- Bradley Parker (born 1970), English cricketer
