= Ann Parker (photographer) =

American artist and photographer (1934–2022)

Ann Parker (1934–2022) was an American artist and photographer. Her work is included in the collections of the Whitney Museum of American Art, the Metropolitan Museum of Art and the Getty Museum Los Angeles. Parker died in 2022.
