= Tommy Parker =

Tommy Parker may refer to:

- Tommy Parker (footballer) (1924–1996), English footballer
- Tommy Parker (judge) (born 1963), American judge in Tennessee
- Tommy Parker (rugby league) (1901–1969), Welsh rugby league footballer of the 1920s and 1930s

== See also ==
- Thomas Parker (disambiguation)
- Tom Parker (disambiguation)
