= Steven Parker =

Steven Parker may refer to:

- Steven Parker (defensive back) (born 1995), American football player
- Steven Parker, military police officer whose actions were the subject of the U.S. Supreme Court case Saucier v. Katz
- Steven Parker, co-creator of the website Neowin
- Steven Christopher Parker (born 1989), actor
- Steven J. Parker (died 2009), Boston pediatrician and co-author of the 7th edition of The Common Sense Book of Baby and Child Care

== See also ==
- Stephen Parker (disambiguation)
- Steve Parker (disambiguation)
