= Matthew Parker (disambiguation) =

Matthew Parker (1504–1575) was archbishop of Canterbury from 1559 until his death.

Matthew or Matt Parker may also refer to:

- Matthew Parker (bishop) (born 1963), British Anglican bishop; current area Bishop of Stafford
- Matthew Parker (cricketer) (born 1990), Scottish cricketer
- Matthew Parker (footballer) (born 1996), Australian rules footballer
- Matthew Parker (singer) (born 1994), American contemporary Christian music singer-songwriter
- Matt Parker (born 1980), Australian stand-up comedian, author and YouTube personality
- Matthew Parker (author) (born 1970), English author
- Matt Parker (Holby City), a fictional character in BBC TV drama Holby City
- Matt Parker, main character in the U.S. TV series Shifting Gears
