= Joseph Parker (cricketer) =

English cricketer (born 1976)

Personal information
- Full name: Joseph Timothy Parker
- Born: 23 August 1976 (age 50); Bromley, Kent, England
- Batting: Right-handed
- Bowling: Right-arm off-break

Domestic team information
- Years: Team
- 1998: Oxford University

Career statistics
Competition	First-class
Matches	5
Runs scored	80
Batting average	16.00
100s/50s	0/0
Top score	19
Catches/stumpings	1/–
- Source: ESPNcricinfo, 1 May 2018

Joseph Timothy Parker (born 23 August 1976) is a former English cricketer who played five first-class matches for Oxford University in 1998. In all his five innings, he was dismissed for between 11 and 19.

Parker played for Liverpool Cricket Club as a teenager.
