= Edwin Wallace Parker =

American Methodist Episcopal missionary bishop (1833-1901)

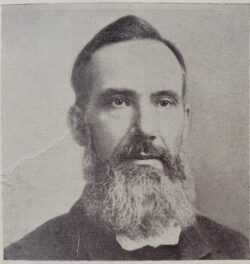
- Born: January 21, 1833; St. Johnsbury, Vermont, United States
- Died: June 4, 1901 (aged 68)
- Employer: Evangelical Methodist Church
- Title: missionary bishop

Edwin Wallace Parker (January 21, 1833 – June 4, 1901) was an American Methodist Episcopal missionary bishop.

== Biography ==
He was born at St. Johnsbury, Vermont. He was educated at the St. Johnsbury Academy and at the General Biblical Institute at Concord, New Hampshire, joining the Vermont Conference of his denomination in 1857.

In 1859 he sailed for India and spent the rest of his life there. He was stationed first in the Bijnor district, and later he was for several years superintendent of the Moradabad mission schools. On the organization of the India Conference in 1864 he became presiding elder. In 1900 he was elected Missionary Bishop of Southern Asia.

Parker Intermediate College, established in 1865–66, a school in Moradabad, was named after him.
