= Jeffrey A. Parker =

American businessman and education philanthropist

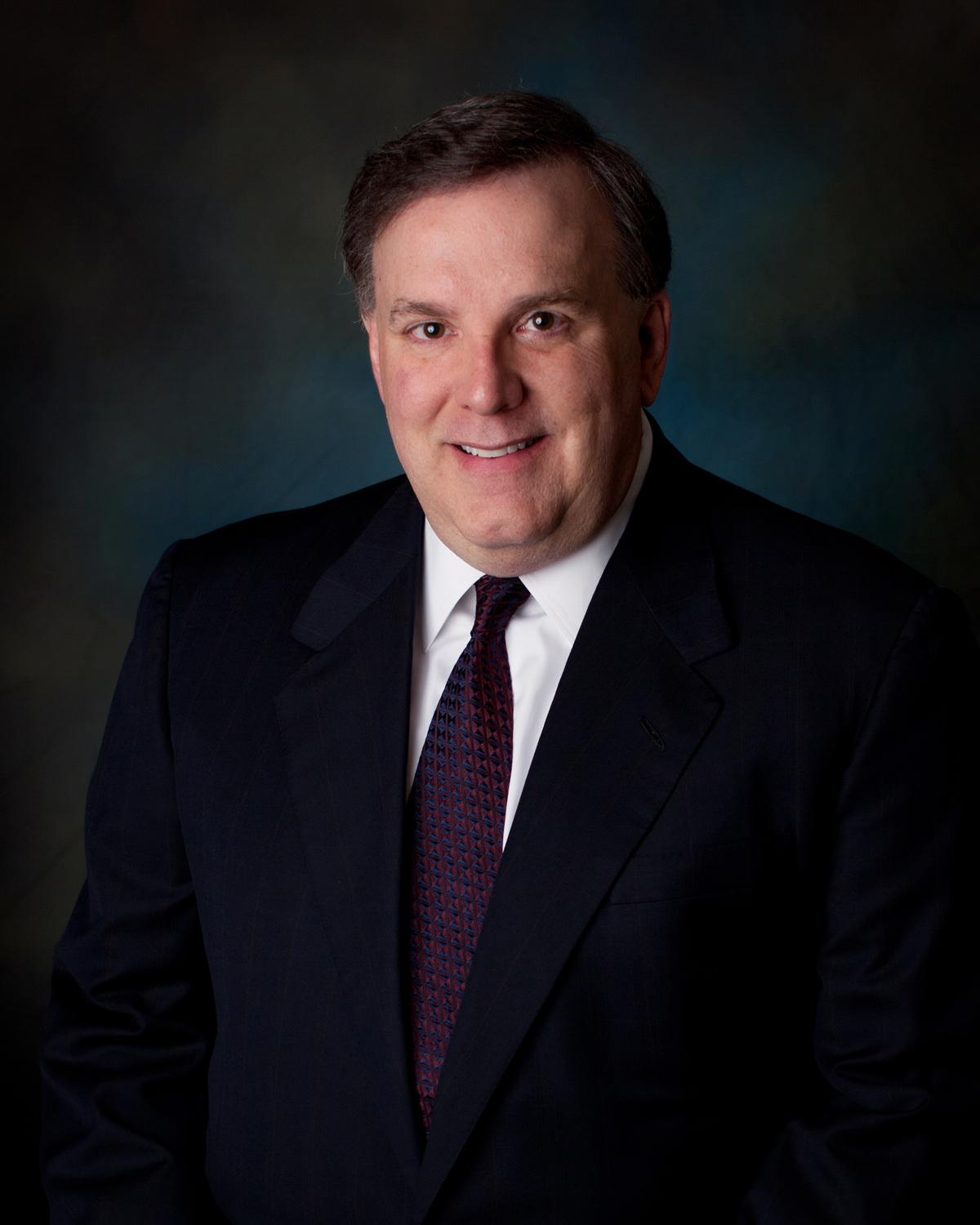
- Jeffrey A. Parker, August 2015
- Born: July 17, 1957; Indianapolis, Indiana, U.S.
- Died: August 23, 2018 (aged 61); Phoenix, Arizona, U.S.

Jeffrey Alan Parker (July 17, 1957 – August 23, 2018) was an American businessman and education philanthropist.

== Early life and education ==
Jeffrey Parker was born in Indianapolis, Indiana, to William and Patricia Parker. He graduated from Sycamore High School (Cincinnati, Ohio). His father, William, was a division president for Kroger Foods. He went on to receive a bachelor's degree in Political Science and a Masters in Public Administration from Jacksonville State University (JSU) in Jacksonville, Alabama. In addition to his studies at JSU, he earned an additional 18 graduate hours in Marketing from Mercer University in Georgia.

== Corporate career ==
After graduation, Parker worked in management in the consumer packaged goods industry for General Foods Corporation, Schering-Plough, and Con-Agra. He then worked in Senior Executive Management positions at Sara Lee, Foster Farms and Crider Foods. Parker retired at age 40.

In 2000, he accepted a position as Executive in Residence at Jacksonville State University's College of Commerce and Business Administration (A position he held through December 2013). Parker received Jacksonville State University's Alumnus of the Year Award in 2008.

In 2005, Parker was asked to take over a small community dental center run by The Calhoun County Community Foundation. Upon Parker's arrival as CEO, the clinic separated from the foundation and was named after its founder, Dr. Warren Sarrell, as “Sarrell Regional Dental Centers for Public Health”. As CEO, Parker oversaw the clinic's growth from serving a few thousand children in its first year to treating 170,000 patient visits in 2015. By September 2015, Sarrell operated 17 dental clinics and a mobile dental bus, employing 49 dentists (including specialists) and 43 hygienists.

== PBS Frontline ==
In the June 26, 2012 episode of PBS's Frontline series titled "Dollars and Dentists," Frontline correspondent Miles O'Brien examined different models of dental services that were attempting to address the access to care issue faced by the majority of Medicaid recipients in America. Jeffrey Parker was interviewed to discuss how Sarrell Dental had become one of the few working models nationwide to see growing success. Parker offered the Sarrell Dental model as a replicable system that could offer a critical component to national oral healthcare reform, while also inviting other dentists to learn from their success: "Who can be against a model that is eliminating decay? ... they need to come see it, they need to adopt it, it works."

== Education philanthropy ==
In 1995, Parker established the Jeffrey A. Parker Scholarship at Jacksonville State University. This scholarship provides college tuition and selection is based on academic merit, university involvement, and financial need. To qualify, candidates must hold senior status in the JSU College of Business. As of July 2015, more than 75 students had received financial aid from the fund.

== Oral Healthcare Reform ==
Parker's push for oral healthcare reform brought national attention to the innovations at Sarrell. In an article on Forbes, Changemakers’ Kristie Wang explained: “Sarrell Dental & Eye Centers has done something that many in the U.S. health industry thought was impossible—providing dental care to children covered by Medicaid, while running a sustainable business and lowering the cost of care to the government." After Sarrell Dental achieved national recognition for its role in oral healthcare reform, Parker was asked to speak in a number of national forums as an expert on operational efficiency and effectiveness.

== DentaQuest Affiliation ==
As of September 2013, Sarrell Dental and DentaQuest Care Group of Massachusetts have announced they are forming an affiliation to advance their shared mission to improve oral health. Parker will now hold the title of chief executive officer of DentaQuest Healthcare Delivery. As Parker states, "this affiliation represents a validation of our model of care and demonstrates an alignment between our two organizations. Through this affiliation, DentaQuest and Sarrell Dental will seek to ensure more people have access to the dental care they need." In August 2015, Parker informed DentaQuest he would be departing the company on December 31, 2015.

== Recognition ==
In the December 2013 issue of HealthLeaders Magazine titled "HealthLeaders20," Jeffrey Parker was selected as one of the twenty individuals who are changing healthcare for the better. Parker is the first-ever to be selected from the dental field. The only other Alabama resident who has ever been named in the HealthLeaders20 is the famed orthopedic surgeon Dr. James Andrews (physician).

Parker was recognized by Ashoka: Innovators for the Public as an Ashoka Fellow in February 2014, for his work as a "social entrepreneur" (Kailash Satyarthi an Ashoka Fellow, won the 2014 Nobel Peace Prize). He is the first person in the US to be honored from the oral health field.

He was interviewed on February 26, 2014, by Forbes.com regarding his new healthcare delivery model.

Parker was recognized on January 6, 2015, by Slate.com regarding Sarrell's healthcare business model.

On May 22, 2015, Parker received an honorary Doctor of Humane Letters before giving the commencement address at the Arizona School of Dentistry and Oral Health.

On November 9, 2015, the Manhattan Institute for Policy Research presented Parker as a recipient of their 2015 Richard C. Cornuelle award for Social Entrepreneurship.

== Personal life and death ==
In addition to two sisters, Parker had one brother, William Douglas Parker, who is the current chief executive officer and chairman of American Airlines. He died in Phoenix, Arizona on August 23, 2018, at the age of 61.

== Publications ==
- Parker, Jeffrey A. "Sarrell Dental: Beyond The Operatory", KDA Today. July/August 2012.
