= Bill Parker (broadcaster) =

Radio and television broadcaster

- Born: William Parker; January 18, 1928; Canastota, New York
- Died: August 19, 2019 (aged 91); Vestal, New York
- Other names: Officer Bill, The Atlantic Weatherman, The Dean of Broadcasting
- Occupation: Broadcaster
- Years active: 1948-2010
- Known for: Broadcaster for WNBF, member of the New York State Broadcasters Association Hall of Fame

William Parker (January 18, 1928 – August 19, 2019) was an American broadcaster for WNBF and a member of the New York State Broadcasters Association Hall of Fame. Shows hosted by Parker include the TV Ranch Club, Captain Galaxy, and the Officer Bill Show. Parker started working at WNBF in 1948 and retired in 1999. In 2015, Parker was added to the New York State Broadcasters Hall of Fame.

== Early life and education ==
Parker was born in Canastota, New York, in 1928, which is in the town of Lenox, New York. After graduating from Canastota High School in 1945, Parker joined the United States Army. Between 1947 and 1948, Parker attended Columbia College in Chicago.

== Career ==
In 1948, Parker started working for WNBF. In 1949, Parker helped create WNBF-TV, where he hosted a show on its first day. On television, Parker hosted children's shows such as the Officer Bill Show, and TV Ranch Club on WNBF-TV. He left WNBF for a short time in the early 60's to work across town at WINR Radio and TV. On Channel 40 he was the host of the Colonel Bleep show. He hosted the show as Colonel Bolt.

== Later life and death ==
In 1999, Parker retired from WNBF after working there for 51 years. In 2015, Parker was added to the New York State Broadcasters Hall of Fame. Parker died on August 19, 2019, and was buried with military honors.
