= Al Parker (disambiguation) =

Al Parker (1952–1992) was an American actor, director, and producer in gay pornographic films.

Al Parker may also refer to:

- Al Parker (artist) (1906–1985), American artist and illustrator
- Al Parker (tennis) (born 1968), American tennis player

== See also ==
- Albert Parker (disambiguation)
- Alan Parker (disambiguation)
- Alexander Parker (disambiguation)
