= Dave Parker (rugby) =

GB international rugby league & union player (1935-2018)

Personal information
- Full name: George David Parker
- Born: 1935; Barrow-in-Furness, Cumbria, England
- Died: 9 November 2018 (aged 83)

Playing information

Rugby union
- Position: Number Eight
Club
Years	Team	Pld	T	G	FG	P
	Manchester
Representative
Years	Team	Pld	T	G	FG	P
	Lancashire	24

Rugby league
- Position: Loose forward
Club
Years	Team	Pld	T	G	FG	P
1960–67	Oldham	198	34	0	0	102
Representative
Years	Team	Pld	T	G	FG	P
1964	Great Britain	2	1	0	0	3

Dave Parker (1935 – 9 November 2018) was an English professional rugby league footballer who played in the 1960s having played rugby union at county level in the 1950s. He played at representative level for Great Britain, and at club level for Oldham, as a loose forward.

Born in Barrow in Furness in 1935, Parker played rugby union while a student at Manchester University and captained both Manchester and the Lancashire representative team before turning professional with Oldham in August 1960. During his rugby union career he made 24 appearances for Lancashire and was considered one of the best number eights in the country.

In a career with Oldham he captained the club to the semi-finals of the 1963-64 Challenge Cup and winning the second division championship in the same season. He made 198 appearances for Oldham, scoring 34 tries, before an injury in the opening game of the 1967–68 Northern Rugby Football League season against Liverpool City ended his playing career.

Parker was capped twice for Great Britain in 1964 playing in two victories against France in March of that year.

Parker died on 9 November 2018, at the age of 83.
