= Andy Parker =

Andy Parker may refer to:

- Andy Parker (businessman) (born 1969), British businessman, CEO of Capita
- Andy Parker (musician) (born 1952), British drummer
- Andy Parker (American football) (born 1961), American football player
- Andy Parker (physicist), professor of high energy physics

== See also ==
- Andrew Parker (disambiguation)
