= Nick Parker (journalist) =

British journalist

- Born: 1960 or 1961 (age 64–65)
- Occupation: Journalist

Nick Parker (born 1960/1961) is an English journalist and chief foreign correspondent of London-based The Sun newspaper. He has covered major breaking news stories across the world as well as domestic stories for The Sun since 1988 and is not to be confused with the CNN reporter of the same name.

== Career ==
Parker's stories include the Piper Alpha disaster, the Lockerbie bombing, both Gulf Wars, the Balkans conflict, the Dunblane massacre, the Kosovo crisis, the return of Great Train Robber Ronald Biggs, 9/11, the Afghan war, the Beslan massacre, the Boxing Day tsunami, Hurricane Katrina, the Darfur crisis, the Israel v Hezbollah war in Lebanon, the Mumbai Massacre, the Haiti earthquake, the invasion of Gaza, the Sousse beach massacre and the Paris terror attacks. He was also a member of The Sun's reporting team on the 1989 Hillsborough disaster.

In addition, Parker has worked on major sporting events including the London and Beijing Olympics and football World Cups and European Championships.

Parker also was responsible for a story in The Sun revolving around cricket player Ben Stokes's murdered siblings, which drew strong criticism from the cricketer and public at large. Stokes denounced the article, describing The Sun's actions as "low and despicable".

== Legal issues ==
On 11 February 2012, Parker was arrested by detectives investigating payments to public officials as part of the Metropolitan Police's Operation Elveden. He was subsequently charged with three counts of aiding and abetting misconduct in public office relating to payments made to a police officer and prison officer. He was also charged as part of the Metropolitan Police's Operation Tuleta with receiving a mobile phone belonging to Labour MP Siobhain McDonagh.

After a three-week trial on 9 December 2014, Parker – who argued all his actions were in keeping with Press Complaints Commission Code of Conduct and in the public interest – was found not guilty of all three aiding and abetting misconduct charges but convicted of receiving the mobile phone and sentenced to three months' imprisonment, suspended for 12 months.

In 2023, actress Sienna Miller said she was "horrified" to see court documents which she believed showed Parker had claimed expenses and met a "medical records tracer" in July and August 2005 to discuss her pregnancy.

She said the Sun's actions "shattered me, damaged my reputation - at times beyond repair", causing her to accuse family and friends of selling information "in a state of intense paranoia and fear".

== Links to articles about Nick Parker ==
- http://www.theguardian.com/media/2014/dec/14/nick-parker-sun-reporter-conviction-bad-joke
- http://www.pressgazette.co.uk/content/conviction-nick-parker-means-mps-expenses-scandal-would-never-be-exposed-if-it-happened
- http://www.pressgazette.co.uk/lawyer-nick-parker-case-shows-journalists-treated-more-severely-common-criminals
