= Aaron Parker (soccer) =

American soccer player (born 1986)

Personal information
- Full name: Aaron Parker
- Date of birth: December 28, 1986 (age 39)
- Place of birth: Buckner, Kentucky, United States
- Height: 6 ft 2 in (1.88 m)
- Position: Forward

Youth career
- 2005–2008: Elon Phoenix

Senior career*
Years	Team	Apps	(Gls)
2009	Wilmington Hammerheads	4	(0)
- * Club domestic league appearances and goals as of 11 October 2009

Aaron Parker (born December 28, 1986, in Buckner, Kentucky) is an American former professional soccer player.

== Career ==
=== College ===
Parker attended Trinity High School and played college soccer at Elon University from 2005 to 2008.

=== Professional ===
Parker turned professional in 2009 when he joined the Wilmington Hammerheads in the USL Second Division. He made his professional debut on April 25, 2009, as a substitute in Wilmington's opening day 2–2 tie with the Charlotte Eagles.
