= Dave Parker (rock musician) =

American musical artist (born 1978)

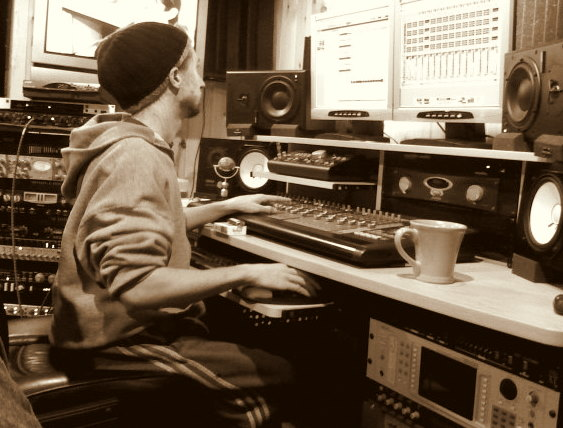

Background information
- Also known as: Wavis M. Gravis
- Born: David Burns Parker; July 15, 1978 (age 47)
- Origin: Savannah, Georgia, United States
- Genres: Rock alternative rock progressive rock hip hop indie rock
- Occupations: Musician, producer, songwriter, live sound engineer
- Instruments: Guitar, keyboards, bass, piano, programming
- Years active: 1997—present

Dave Parker (born July 15, 1978) is an American musician, producer, writer, live sound engineer, and bassist for Albany, New York indie rock band Stellar Young. He has also worked with various other bands throughout his career.

== Career ==
=== Bleed Theory and Divest ===
Bleed Theory began as a studio project, more or less, by Dave Parker, Nate Kelley and Kurt Brown in the fall of 1997. Nate asked Morgan Evans to come down and collaborate on one of the tunes being worked on. Josh Eppard also joined around this time on drums. The band was a side project for Nate, Morgan and Josh, who were involved in Shabutie, Fuse, and 3 (band), respectively. Soon, Josh left to take Nate's place in Shabutie (later to become Coheed and Cambria) and Zac Shaw, a long time friend of Nate and Morgan took his place. The band proceeded until 2001 when Nate left and was replaced by Mike McCoy on bass. The band then evolved into Divest. After guitarist Dave Parker joined Coheed and Cambria as touring keyboardist Divest also went on hiatus until briefly reforming with three original members Morgan Evans (vocals), Kurt Brown (guitar) and Nate Kelley (bass).

=== Counterfeit Disaster ===
In the fall of 2004 Dave Parker, Joe Maggio, Sean-Paul Pillsworth, and Kenny Camacho came together and began writing for what would become Counterfeit Disaster. After a few months the project had to be put on hold indefinitely. In winter of 2005 the project was renewed, adding Dave Daw and Dave Bodie to help bring a more live sound to what was initially intended to be a fully sequenced project. Josh Eppard formally of Coheed and Cambria has now since joined on drums.

=== Coheed and Cambria ===
Dave Parker began playing live keyboards for Coheed and Cambria September 17, 2005 at Irving Plaza as part of the CMJ Festival. While with Coheed and Cambria, Dave Parker toured with: Avenged Sevenfold, Dredg, Circa Survive, Thrice, mewithoutYou in support of Coheed and Cambria's 2005 release Good Apollo, I'm Burning Star IV, Volume One: From Fear Through the Eyes of Madness. Additionally, they shared the stage with Deftones, TOOL, Fall Out Boy, Muse, Thirty Seconds to Mars, and My Chemical Romance. During Parker's tenure Coheed and Cambria performed at Lollapalooza, Reading and Leeds Festivals, Coachella, Pukkelpop. He toured with the band until December 15, 2006, and appears on the DVD "The Last Supper: Live at Hammerstein Ballroom".

=== Weerd Science ===
Weerd Science is a project of Coheed and Cambria drummer Josh Eppard. Dave Parker toured with the project on keyboards. Weerd Science toured with Gym Class Heroes in 2004 and with Bane in 2005. Dave Parker also engineered the debut Weerd Science album Friends and Nervous Breakdowns which was released by Equal Vision Records in March 2005. Additionally, Dave Parker performed guitar, keyboards, some bass, some drum programming, and co-wrote Sick Kids which was released by Horris Records in May 2011.

=== Stellar Young ===
Dave Parker joined The City Never Sleeps in 2010. They released the Madison EP in 2011. The City Never Sleeps changed their name to Stellar Young in September 2012 and released the debut album Everything At Once in December 2013 for "name your price" on bandcamp. The band released their sophomore album Vessels in December 2014 through an exclusive stream on Altpress.com . In September 2015 they also released "Love is Free", the single from their most recent album The Spark Caught on Altpress.com .

== Discography ==
- Weerd Science - Friends and Nervous Breakdowns (2005)
- Counterfeit Disaster - Problem Reaction Solution EP (2006)
- Counterfeit Disaster - The EP (2007)
- Weerd Science - Sick Kids (2011)
- MC Lars - Lars Attacks! (2011) produced "How To Be An Indie Rapper"
- The City Never Sleeps - Madison EP (2011)
- Stellar Young - Everything At Once (2012)
- Stellar Young - Vessels (2014)
- Stellar Young - The Spark Caught (2015)
