= Alan M. Parker =

British billionaire businessman (born 1939)

- Born: 31 March 1939 (age 86); Rhodesia (now Zimbabwe)
- Citizenship: British
- Occupation: Businessman
- Spouse: Jette Parker
- Children: 3

Alan M. Parker (born 31 March 1939) is a British billionaire businessman.

== Early life ==
Alan M. Parker was born into a family in Rhodesia (now Zimbabwe), the son of a British colonial civil servant.

== Career ==
Parker trained as an accountant, and worked for the Hong Kong–based DFS Group. He became DFS's third largest shareholder, and in 1997 when it was taken over by LVMH, Parker received about $840m (£464m) for his 20% stake. Parker also made money investing in hedge funds and high technology.

As of 2014, Parker is living in Geneva, Switzerland and has a net worth of £2.34 billion.

== Philanthropy ==
His wife Jette sponsors The Royal Opera's Jette Parker Young Artists Programme. In 1983 he founded the Oak Foundation, a philanthropic grant-making organisation.

== Personal life ==
He is married to Jette Parker, and they have three children, Caroline, Natalie and Kristian.
