= Neverender: Children of The Fence Edition =

Neverender: Children of the Fence Edition

Box set by Coheed and Cambria
- Released: March 24, 2009
- Recorded: October 22–25, 2008
- Genre: Progressive rock, emo, pop punk, new prog, alternative rock, post-hardcore
- Length: 298:46 (live shows only)
- Label: Columbia
- Director: Doug Spangenberg
- Producer: Space Monkey Studios, Inc.

Coheed and Cambria chronology
Good Apollo, I'm Burning Star IV, Volume Two: No World for Tomorrow (2007)	Neverender: Children of the Fence Edition (2009)	Year of the Black Rainbow (2010)

Professional ratings
Review scores
Source	Rating
AbsolutePunk.net	98% link
Allmusic	link
Metal Hammer	8/10 stars
Rolling Stone	link

Neverender: Children of the Fence Edition is a live CD/DVD box set by American progressive rock band Coheed and Cambria that was released on March 24, 2009. It contains five DVDs and four CDs featuring live footage of the concert series Neverender and audio from each night. In addition, a fifth disc features a documentary of the concert series. The band officially reported on their Myspace that the Children Of The Fence edition would be limited to 15,000 copies worldwide. The first 3,000 copies were signed by the band. Children of the Fence is a reference to Heaven's Fence, the universe in which the band's concept albums take place, and thereby the nickname for fans of the band.

== History ==
Coheed and Cambria embarked on a sixteen date tour across four cities with four dates taking place per city. On each one of these four dates, the band performed one of their concept albums telling the story of The Amory Wars. The DVD set was announced the first night of the New York City leg of the tour on October 22, 2008. The DVD was filmed at Terminal 5. A condensed version was also made available on March 24, 2009 and contains two discs featuring the live concert only. The set debuted at #1 on Billboard's Top Music Video chart. The set was certified Gold by the RIAA in May 2009.

== Track listing CD or DVD ==
=== Disc 1/2 ===
October 22, 2008 – New York, NY (Terminal 5) The Second Stage Turbine Blade

1. Second Stage Turbine Blade – 0:59
2. Time Consumer – 6:20
3. Devil in Jersey City – 4:36
4. Everything Evil – 7:18
5. Delirium Trigger – 5:54
6. Hearshot Kid Disaster – 6:03
7. 33 – 3:29
8. Junesong Provision – 6:16
9. Neverender – 7:26
10. God Send Conspirator – 6:13
11. IRO-Bot – 7:32

=== Disc 3/4 ===
October 23, 2008 – New York, NY (Terminal 5) In Keeping Secrets of Silent Earth: 3

1. The Ring in Return – 1:50
2. In Keeping Secrets of Silent Earth: 3 – 8:20
3. Cuts Marked in the March of Men – 5:08
4. Three Evils (Embodied in Love & Shadow) – 5:15
5. The Crowing – 7:42
6. Blood Red Summer – 5:44
7. The Camper Velorium I: Faint of Hearts – 5:15
8. The Camper Velorium II: Backend of Forever – 5:27
9. The Camper Velorium III: Al the Killer – 4:19
10. A Favor House Atlantic – 4:02
11. The Light & The Glass – 9:23
12. 21:13 (Encore) – 9:29 (Due to an editing error, the IRO-Bot Reprise was not included on the DVD for this track. It is, however, on the CD.)

=== Disc 5/6 ===
October 24, 2008 – New York, NY (Terminal 5) Good Apollo, I'm Burning Star IV, Volume One: From Fear Through the Eyes of Madness

1. Keeping the Blade – 0:56
2. Always & Never – 2:12
3. Welcome Home – 5:44
4. Ten Speed (Of God's Blood & Burial) – 3:47
5. Crossing the Frame – 3:20
6. Apollo I: The Writing Writer – 4:56
7. Once Upon Your Dead Body – 3:32
8. Wake Up – 4:38
9. The Suffering – 4:06
10. The Lying Lies & Dirty Secrets of Miss Erica Court – 3:13
11. Mother May I – 4:25
12. The Willing Well I: Fuel for the Feeding End – 6:54
13. The Willing Well II: From Fear Through the Eyes of Madness – 6:41
14. The Willing Well III: Apollo II: The Telling Truth – 6:55
15. The Willing Well IV: The Final Cut – 18:29
16. Everything Evil / The Trooper / Devil in Jersey City Medley (Encore) (DVD only) – 11:15

=== Disc 7/8 ===
October 25, 2008 – New York, NY (Terminal 5) Good Apollo, I'm Burning Star IV, Volume Two: No World for Tomorrow

1. The Reaping – 1:20
2. No World for Tomorrow – 5:04
3. The Hound (Of Blood and Rank) – 4:43
4. Feathers – 4:50
5. The Running Free – 4:59
6. Mother Superior – 6:41
7. Gravemakers & Gunslingers – 5:22
8. Justice in Murder – 4:21
9. The End Complete I: The Fall of House Atlantic – 1:17
10. The End Complete II: Radio Bye Bye – 5:00
11. The End Complete III: The End Complete – 7:28
12. The End Complete IV: The Road and the Damned – 3:45
13. The End Complete V: On the Brink – 7:09
14. I Shall Be Released (Encore featuring Warren Haynes) (DVD only) – 5:52
15. Welcome Home (Encore featuring Warren Haynes) (DVD only) – 6:10

=== Disc 9 ===
- Documentary: "The Fiction Will See the Real" – 1:18:04
- Neverender: Chicago – 4:09
- Neverender: Los Angeles – 6:13
- Neverender: London – 6:57
- Opening Acts: Michael Todd – 21:38
- Opening Acts: Davenport Cabinet – 7:01
- Opening Acts: Richard Christy – 2:24
- Opening Acts: Claudio Sanchez – 3:40
- Web Content: Toughest Part of Neverender – 2:13
- Web Content: Happiest to Play – 1:24
- Web Content: Toughest Song to Play – 1:13
- Web Content: Toughest Album to Play – 1:13
- Web Content: What Audience Will Get – 1:55
- Web Content: Neverender Teaser – 0:42
- Web Content: Happy Holidays – 1:50
- Wayne Andrews, The Old Bee Keeper [Easter egg; from Sanchez's side project, The Prize Fighter Inferno's album My Brother's Blood Machine] – 4:07

== Extras ==
- 48 page photo book containing pictures submitted by fans.
- 7.5" by 5.5" metal dragonfly
