= Live at the Starland Ballroom =

Live album by Coheed and Cambria
- Released: March 22, 2005
- Recorded: Starland Ballroom, New Jersey
- Genre: New prog, progressive rock, post-hardcore
- Label: Columbia

Coheed and Cambria chronology
Live at the Starland Ballroom (2005)	The Last Supper: Live at Hammerstein Ballroom (2006)

Live at The Starland Ballroom is the first live album by American progressive rock band Coheed and Cambria, released on March 22, 2005. The concert was recorded August 20, 2004 at the Starland Ballroom in Sayreville, New Jersey. The New York City radio station, 92.3 K-Rock put on the show and sold tickets for 92 cents. They sold out almost immediately.

The album was certified Gold by The RIAA on October 31, 2005, for domestic sales exceeding 50,000 copies for a video longform format.

== Track listing ==
No.	Title	Length
1.	"In Keeping Secrets of Silent Earth: 3"	8:05
2.	"Delirium Trigger"	5:10
3.	"A Favor House Atlantic"	3:11
4.	"The Crowing"	6:26
5.	"Devil in Jersey City"	4:30
6.	"Blood Red Summer"	4:04
7.	"Time Consumer"	5:36
8.	"Three Evils (Embodied in Love and Shadow)"	4:37
9.	"Everything Evil"	6:18
10.	"The Light & the Glass" (Acoustic; solo performance by Claudio Sanchez)	7:25

Some of the special features on the DVD are:

- Three music videos (A Favor House Atlantic, Devil In Jersey City, and Blood Red Summer)
- A short documentary on the making of the Blood Red Summer music video
- Live performance from the 2004 Skate and Surf Festival
- Interview with Claudio and Travis.
- Interview with Mic and Josh at ["Blizzard '05"]
