= Good Apollo, I'm Burning Star IV, Volume One: From Fear Through the Eyes of Madness =

2005 album by Coheed and Cambria

Studio album by Coheed and Cambria
- Released: September 20, 2005
- Recorded: February – May 2005
- Studios: Applehead Recording, Woodstock, NY
- Genres: Progressive rock; emo; progressive metal; heavy metal; alternative rock; rock opera
- Length: 71:21
- Label: Columbia
- Producers: Michael Birnbaum & Chris Bittner

Coheed and Cambria chronology
In Keeping Secrets of Silent Earth: 3 (2003)	Good Apollo, I'm Burning Star IV, Volume One: From Fear Through the Eyes of Madness (2005)	Good Apollo, I'm Burning Star IV, Volume Two: No World for Tomorrow (2007)

Alternative cover
- Special edition version cover

Singles from From Fear Through the Eyes of Madness
- 1. "Welcome Home" Released: September 2005; 2. "The Suffering" Released: February 13, 2006; 3. "Ten Speed (of God's Blood & Burial)" Released: 2006

Good Apollo, I'm Burning Star IV, Volume One: From Fear Through the Eyes of Madness is the third studio album by American progressive rock band Coheed and Cambria. It was released on September 20, 2005, through Equal Vision Records and Columbia Records, and is the first release on a major label. It is the third installment of a tetralogy, as well as the final studio album to feature drummer Josh Eppard before his original departure. He was replaced by Chris Pennie who was with the band for their next two albums (although he did not record on No World for Tomorrow due to contractual obligations) before Eppard returned to the band in late 2011. On their previous album, In Keeping Secrets of Silent Earth: 3, the phrase "My dearest Apollo, I'll be burning Star IV" is written after the lyrics for the song "The Light & the Glass".

The album begins to resolve the issues of Claudio Kilgannon's quest to protect the Keywork, and sheds more light on the demise of Coheed and his wife Cambria. Also, it expands on the issues of the Monstar virus and Jesse's involvement in the saga. A graphic novel based upon the entire story of the album was released on the same day. This album, unlike the others, tells the story from the perspective of the author, known as The Writer, and the ways in which his life and personal demons affect his telling of the Amory Wars narrative.

The official site once hosted the third track and first single from the album, entitled "Welcome Home". This song is featured in the music video game Rock Band, and the trailer for the CGI animated movie 9. The band's Myspace and PureVolume had the second single from the album, entitled "The Suffering". The third single was "Ten Speed (of God's Blood & Burial)", released only as a video and never to radio.

== Track listing ==
All lyrics are written by Claudio Sanchez; all music is composed by Coheed and Cambria.

No.	Title	Length
1.	"Keeping the Blade"	2:09
2.	"Always & Never"	2:23
3.	"Welcome Home"	6:14
4.	"Ten Speed (of God's Blood & Burial)"	3:46
5.	"Crossing the Frame"	3:26
6.	"Apollo I: The Writing Writer"	5:15
7.	"Once Upon Your Dead Body"	3:19
8.	"Wake Up"	3:35
9.	"The Suffering"	3:43
10.	"The Lying Lies & Dirty Secrets of Miss Erica Court"	3:17
11.	"Mother May I"	4:31
12.	"The Willing Well I: Fuel for the Feeding End"	7:17
13.	"The Willing Well II: From Fear Through the Eyes of Madness"	7:28
14.	"The Willing Well III: Apollo II: The Telling Truth"	7:18
15.	"The Willing Well IV: The Final Cut"	7:40
Total length:		71:21

Notes

- "The Telling Truth" contains, at approximately 4:46, a reprise of "Blood Red Summer" from the previous Coheed and Cambria album, In Keeping Secrets of Silent Earth: 3. After that, the line "Jesse, bad boy, just come look at what your brother did" is a reference to "Everything Evil" from the band's first album, The Second Stage Turbine Blade.
- "The Final Cut" includes the hidden track "Bron Yr", at approximately 6:20 in, which is a tribute to Led Zeppelin, commonly mistaken as a cover of the Led Zeppelin song "Bron-Yr-Aur Stomp".

The Japanese pressing of the album contained a bonus track, "A Favor House Atlantic" from Live at the Starland Ballroom. "Keeping the Blade" is the only track on the album to feature the time skip motif found on the previous two albums. It is played by string instruments.

== Reception ==
Professional ratings
Aggregate scores
Source	Rating
Metacritic	73/100
Review scores
Source	Rating
AllMusic	4/5 stars
Alternative Press	5/5 stars
Blender	4/5 stars
E! Online	B+
Entertainment Weekly	C+
Melodic.net	3/5 stars
Rolling Stone	3/5 stars
Q	3.5/5 stars
Uncut	3/5 stars

The album was ranked number 69 in the October 2006 issue of Guitar World magazine's list of the greatest 100 guitar albums of all time. An acoustic version of "Wake Up" was featured on the Snakes on a Plane soundtrack.

The CD is Coheed and Cambria's greatest success to date selling over a million copies worldwide. It also received mostly positive reviews, getting a Metacritic score of 73 out of 100.

The album peaked at number 7 on the Billboard 200, selling over 500,000 copies, according to Nielsen SoundScan.

== Bonus edition DVD ==
A special edition of the CD was released, with an alternate cover, and a bonus DVD consisting of the following:

1. "Welcome Home" music video
2. "The Suffering" music video
3. A Favor House Atlantic: The Movie
4. A Favor House Atlantic: Bloopers
5. In the Studio
6. Animated Vignettes

== Live at the Avalon ==
Live at the Avalon

EP by Coheed and Cambria
- Released: 2005
- Recorded: 2005
- Length: 31:00
- Label: Columbia

Coheed and Cambria chronology
Live at La Zona Rosa (2004)	Live at the Avalon (2005)	Kerrang!/XFM UK Acoustic Sessions (2006)

Live at the Avalon is the fifth EP by Coheed and Cambria. Much like their previous EP, Live at La Zona Rosa, (which was packaged with In Keeping Secrets of Silent Earth: 3), Live at the Avalon was packaged with Good Apollo... Volume One when bought at Best Buy. However, unlike the Live at La Zona Rosa EP, this was not recorded at a festival of sorts, but during Coheed and Cambria's 2005 summer tour. This EP included two tracks from In Keeping Secrets of Silent Earth: 3 and two from Good Apollo... Volume One.

=== Track listing ===
1. "Welcome Home" – 5:35
2. "Blood Red Summer" –4:26
3. "In Keeping Secrets of Silent Earth: 3" –8:35
4. "The Willing Well IV: The Final Cut" –12:24

== Graphic novel ==
A graphic novel entitled Good Apollo, I'm Burning Star IV, Volume One: From Fear Through the Eyes of Madness—illustrated by Christopher Shy—was released in September 2005 along with the album of the same name. The story of From Fear Through the Eyes of Madness takes a step outside the science fiction narrative of the first three chapters and examines the life of The Writer, a character who is crafting the lives of the protagonist Claudio and his companions in the form of a fictional story. Through a series of delusional conversations with his 10-speed bicycle about an unfaithful former lover, The Writer decides he must kill the Prise Ambellina to properly end his story. The events in the narrative itself build up to a final confrontation between Jesse's rebel forces and the Red Army of Supreme Tri-Mage Wilhelm Ryan under the command of General Mayo Deftinwolf, as well as a literal meeting of The Writer and Claudio culminating in the death of Ambellina and Claudio's emergence as The Crowing.

This installment has since been remade and follows the new The Amory Wars series of graphic novels. Claudio Sanchez stated that much was lost from the original graphic novel because of financial constraints. He further explained that although Christopher Shy's art is beautiful, it was not the best medium for the album's storytelling.

== Personnel ==
Coheed and Cambria

- Claudio Sanchez – vocals, guitars
- Travis Stever – guitars, lap steel, backing vocals
- Michael Todd – bass guitar, backing vocals
- Josh Eppard – drums, keyboards, backing vocals

Additional musicians

- Danny Louis – keyboards (tracks 5–10 and 15)
- Kara Bullock & Nick Gardner – ukulele
- Chester Brockwell – didgeridoo
- Daniel Sadownick – percussion (tracks 6 and 8)
- Sarah Kathryn Jacobs – backing vocals (tracks 9 and 15)
- Janiris Sanchez (Claudio Sanchez's niece) – child's voice (tracks 2 and 15)
- Kurtis Jungersen – sound effects

Production

- Produced by Michael Birnbaum and Chris Bittner
- Mixed by David Bottrill, with Andy Wallace on "The Suffering"

== Charts ==
Chart performance
Chart (2005)	Peak position
Australian Hitseekers Albums (ARIA)	5
Canadian Albums (Nielsen SoundScan)	21
German Albums (Offizielle Top 100)	85
Scottish Albums (Official Charts)	90
UK Albums (Official Charts)	92
UK Rock & Metal Albums (Official Charts)	6
US Billboard 200	7

== Certifications ==
Certifications
Region	Certification	Certified units/sales
United States (RIAA)	Gold	500,000^{^}
^{^} Shipments figures based on certification alone.
