= The Suffering (song) =

Single by Coheed and Cambria

from the album Good Apollo, I'm Burning Star IV, Volume One: From Fear Through the Eyes of Madness
- Released: February 13, 2006
- Recorded: 2005
- Genre: Progressive rock; emo; alternative rock
- Length: 3:44 (album version); 4:13 (radio version)
- Label: Columbia; Equal Vision
- Composer(s): Claudio Sanchez; Travis Stever; Michael Todd; Josh Eppard
- Producer(s): Michael Birnbaum; Chris Bittner

Coheed and Cambria singles chronology
"Welcome Home" (2005)	"The Suffering" (2006)	"Ten Speed (of God's Blood and Burial)" (2006)

"The Suffering" is a song by American progressive rock band Coheed and Cambria, appearing on the band's third studio album Good Apollo, I'm Burning Star IV, Volume One: From Fear Through the Eyes of Madness. The song was released as the album's second single and had some crossover success, reaching no. 10 on the Billboard Bubbling Under Hot 100 chart.

== Reception ==
"The Suffering" has received positive reviews. The song was selected as an AllMusic reviewer's pick in Rob Theakston's review of the album. Jordan Blum of PopMatters called the song a "sublime blend of catchiness and complexity" that makes the song "instantly appealing and unforgettable."

== Track listing ==
Promo single

No.	Title	Length
1.	"The Suffering" (Radio Version)	4:13
2.	"The Suffering" (Album Version)	3:44

Enhanced CD single

No.	Title	Length
1.	"The Suffering" (Album Version)	3:44
2.	"The Final Cut" (Live in Atlanta from 2005 Summer Tour)	14:44
3.	"The Suffering" (Music Video)	3:49

7" single

Side CO
No.	Title	Length
1.	"The Suffering" (Album Version)	3:44

Side CA
No.	Title	Length
1.	"Welcome Home" (Live in Atlanta from 2005 Summer Tour)	5:42

== Personnel ==
Coheed and Cambria

- Claudio Sanchez – lead vocals, guitar, piano
- Travis Stever – guitar
- Michael Todd – bass
- Josh Eppard – drums

Additional

- Sarah Kathryn Jacobs – backing vocals
- Danny Louis – keyboards

== Charts ==
Chart (2005)	Peak position
US Bubbling Under Hot 100 (Billboard)	10
US Alternative Airplay (Billboard)	16
US Mainstream Rock (Billboard)	29
US Active Rock (Billboard)	29
UK Singles (OCC)	60
UK Rock & Metal (OCC)	4

== Certifications ==
Region	Certification	Certified units/sales
United States (RIAA)	Gold	500,000^{‡}
^{‡} Sales+streaming figures based on certification alone.
