= Nostalgia in Stereo =

Nostalgia In Stereo

Studio album by Davenport Cabinet
- Released: October 14, 2008
- Genre: Alternative rock
- Label: Equal Vision Records

Davenport Cabinet chronology
The English Panther (2006)	Nostalgia In Stereo (2008)	Our Machine (2013)

Nostalgia In Stereo is the second album released by Coheed and Cambria guitarist Travis Stever, under the name of Davenport Cabinet.

== Track listing ==
1. "Square One"
2. "Nostalgia In Stereo"
3. "Thieves"
4. "Milk Foot"
5. "Wrecking Ball"
6. "Rusty Knives"
7. "Angel On The Shoulder"
8. "Pissing In The Wind"
9. "12 Hours"
10. "Tired Of Driving"
11. "Demon Fire"
