= In Keeping Secrets of Silent Earth: 3 =

2003 album by Coheed and Cambria

Studio album by Coheed and Cambria
- Released: October 7, 2003
- Recorded: Applehead Recording, Woodstock, New York
- Genres: Post-hardcore; pop-punk; experimental rock; emo; progressive rock; rock opera
- Length: 69:34
- Labels: Columbia; Equal Vision
- Producers: Michael Birnbaum and Chris Bittner

Coheed and Cambria chronology
| The Second Stage Turbine Blade (2002) | In Keeping Secrets of Silent Earth: 3 (2003) | Good Apollo, I'm Burning Star IV, Volume One: From Fear Through the Eyes of Madness (2005) |

Singles from In Keeping Secrets of Silent Earth: 3
- 1. "A Favor House Atlantic" Released: June 8, 2004; 2. "Blood Red Summer" Released: November 9, 2004; 3. "In Keeping Secrets of Silent Earth: 3" Released: 2005

Professional ratings
Review scores
| Source | Rating |
|---|---|
| Allmusic | 4/5 stars |
| Blender | 4/5 stars |
| Melodic.net | 2/5 stars |
| Q | 3/5 stars |
| Robert Christgau | (dud) |
| Rolling Stone | 3/5 stars |
| Sputnikmusic | 3/5 stars |

In Keeping Secrets of Silent Earth: 3 is the second studio album by American progressive rock band Coheed and Cambria. It was released on October 7, 2003, through Equal Vision Records. It was recorded at Applehead Recording, Woodstock, New York and produced by Michael Birnbaum and Chris Bittner.

== Background ==
The album is the second installment of a tetralogy about the ongoing saga of the Keywork in The Amory Wars. The Amory Wars is also the name of the graphic novel series written by lead singer Claudio Sanchez that details the events foretold in greater detail. There are three notable singles on this album: "A Favor House Atlantic", "Blood Red Summer" and "In Keeping Secrets of Silent Earth: 3".

The album peaked at number 52 on the Billboard 200, has sold over 500,000 copies and is RIAA-certified Gold. Entertainment Weekly described it as being one of the top five key albums in the new prog genre.

In January 2006 Vitamin Records released a string quartet tribute record.

== Synopsis ==
The third chapter from The Amory Wars, the first issue of the In Keeping Secrets of Silent Earth: 3 comic series was released in May 2010, with a new issue being released monthly. The series was co-written by Claudio Sanchez and Peter David and featured interior artist Chris Burnham. A small summary of the chapter's plot was published on the Evil Ink Comics website.

Ten years after "Second Stage Turbine Blade", son Claudio emerges from the depths of Shylos Ten, the Fence's "quiet" planet where the Red Army performs its brutal interrogations and imprisonments. In finding out that his entire family has been murdered, Claudio begins his quest for vendetta. His foes, Supreme Tri Mage Wilhelm Ryan and General Mayo Deftinwolf sense that he is still alive and holds special powers. They know they must stop him before he defeats them. Meanwhile, Inferno (Jesse Kilgannon) takes up arms against the Red Army (“Man your Battlestations”) in an effort to seek the same kind of vengeance on him. In Claudio’s re-emergence he teams up with Ambellina, the Prise who is selected by her peers to be his guide. The pair along with Sizer, a disassembled IRO-bot, seek out Inferno to find answers as to why his family were killed, but their plans take an unexpected turn in a ship called the Camper Velourium, and a freighter pilot named Al the Killer.

== Track listing ==
All lyrics are written by Claudio Sanchez; all music is composed by Coheed and Cambria.

In Keeping Secrets of Silent Earth: 3
| No. | Title | Length |
|---|---|---|
| 1. | "The Ring in Return" | 2:08 |
| 2. | "In Keeping Secrets of Silent Earth: 3" | 8:13 |
| 3. | "Cuts Marked in the March of Men" | 5:01 |
| 4. | "Three Evils (Embodied in Love and Shadow)" | 5:11 |
| 5. | "The Crowing" | 6:40 |
| 6. | "Blood Red Summer" | 4:13 |
| 7. | "The Camper Velourium I: Faint of Hearts" | 5:22 |
| 8. | "The Camper Velourium II: Backend of Forever" | 5:23 |
| 9. | "The Camper Velourium III: Al the Killer" | 4:16 |
| 10. | "A Favor House Atlantic" | 4:00 |
| 11. | "The Light & the Glass" | 9:40 |
| 23. | "21:13" (hidden track) | 9:50 |
| Total length: | | 1:09:34 |

"A Favor House Atlantic"
A sample of "A Favor House Atlantic" from In Keeping Secrets of Silent Earth: 3

Notes: It is debated whether tracks 7–9 are titled "The Camper Velourium" or "The Velourium Camper." The original CD and most websites list the tracks as "Velourium Camper", and Al's ship is called the Velourium Camper in the comics, but the re-released CD case and the official website both say "Camper Velourium." Claudio referred to the ship that the tracks are based on as the Camper Velourium (in a Metal Hammer Magazine interview) and on their Myspace page, the track is abbreviated TCV, so "Camper Velourium" is assumed to be the proper name of the songs. "The Camper Velourium" is also the way the tracks are named on the Neverender: Children of The Fence Edition boxset.

"21:13" is track 23 on the CD, following the silent tracks from tracks 12 to 22, collectively known as "A Lot of Nothing I-XI". These silent tracks were omitted in the digital version and rereleases.

== Vinyl LP ==
A 2 disc 12" vinyl LP has been produced for this album. Four sets were made, one printed on two black discs, one on two transparent discs, one on orange and white discs, and another with blue and gray marbled discs. The track listing on these, like the CD album, omits all of the "A Lot of Nothing" tracks, as well as "21:13", while "21:13" is still contained on the vinyl.

In August 2014, Coheed and Cambria announced a remastered, new pressing of the album on vinyl. There are currently three versions of this new LP set available: a grey marbled disc set, a peach marbled disc set (only available during the Neverender IKSSE3 tour), and a black set pressed on 180g vinyl discs. The track listing on this version is the first to list "2113" on the back.

== Personnel ==
Personnel taken from In Keeping Secrets liner notes.

Coheed and Cambria

- Claudio Sanchez – vocals, guitars
- Travis Stever – guitars
- Michael Todd – bass
- Josh Eppard – drums

Additional personnel

- Danny Louis – additional keyboards
- Michael Birnbaum – production
- Chris Bittner – production
- Roger Lian – mastering
- Bill Scoville – art direction and design
- Justin Meyer – drum tech

== Charts ==
2003–2004 chart performance
| Chart (2003–2004) | Peak position |
|---|---|
| UK Independent Albums (Official Charts) | 44 |
| US Billboard 200 | 52 |
| US Independent Albums (Billboard) | 5 |

2006 chart performance
| Chart (2006) | Peak position |
|---|---|
| UK Rock & Metal Albums (Official Charts) | 14 |

2023 chart performance
| Chart (2023) | Peak position |
|---|---|
| US Indie Store Album Sales (Billboard) | 22 |

== Certifications ==
Certifications
| Region | Certification | Certified units/sales |
|---|---|---|
| United States (RIAA) | Gold | 500,000^{^} |
^{^} Shipments figures based on certification alone.

== Live at La Zona Rosa ==
Live at La Zona Rosa

EP by Coheed and Cambria
- Released: 2004
- Recorded: March 19, 2004 at La Zona Rosa, Austin, Texas
- Length: 32:09
- Label: Columbia
- Producers: Chuck E. Meyers; Nicholas A Terry

Coheed and Cambria chronology
| Delirium Trigger (2000) | Live at La Zona Rosa (2004) | Live at the Avalon (2005) |

Live at La Zona Rosa is the fourth EP by Coheed and Cambria. It was recorded during the band's set while playing at the Burning Van concerts in La Zona Rosa in Austin, Texas on March 19, 2004. It came packaged as a bonus disc with In Keeping Secrets of Silent Earth: 3 when purchased at Best Buy stores in the US or online via Tower Records' website. Preorders of My Brother's Blood Machine, the album by Claudio Sanchez's solo project the Prize Fighter Inferno, were also accompanied by this CD. It includes three tracks from their debut studio album The Second Stage Turbine Blade, and two tracks from their second studio album In Keeping Secrets of Silent Earth: 3.

=== Track listing ===
1. "Intro" – 0:48
2. "Devil in Jersey City" – 4:47
3. "Delirium Trigger" – 5:16
4. "The Crowing" – 6:37
5. "Blood Red Summer" – 4:24
6. "Everything Evil (extended jam version)" – 10:17

== See also ==
- The Amory Wars – A complete overview of the story
