= Neverender =

2008 concert series by Coheed and Cambria

- Tour by Coheed and Cambria
- The tour poster
- Start date: October 22, 2008
- End date: December 5, 2008
- No. of shows: 16

Neverender was a four-night concert series performed by Coheed and Cambria. It took place in New York, Los Angeles, Chicago and London, and consisted of one of the band's four studio albums being played in full each night, telling the story of the concept in sequence according to each album. "Neverender" is a song from the album The Second Stage Turbine Blade.

- Night One: The Second Stage Turbine Blade
- Night Two: In Keeping Secrets of Silent Earth: 3
- Night Three: Good Apollo, I'm Burning Star IV, Volume One: From Fear Through the Eyes of Madness
- Night Four: Good Apollo, I'm Burning Star IV, Volume Two: No World For Tomorrow

(The London showing played in a different order due to cancellation on December 2.)

== Announcement ==
In early July 2008, the band's official website and MySpace featured a teaser poster with the dragonfly artwork for an event called Neverender. A few days later, the event was unveiled to the public. Four days before all of the tickets went on sale there was a presale of special "VIP" tickets. These were 10% of the total number of tickets for the concerts. They sold out within minutes of going on sale.

In early August, the band's official website along with their MySpace featured two flags on the same Neverender poster. Two days later it was announced that Neverender would also have shows in Chicago and London. The film Night of the Living Dead was played in the background on night four.

== Neverender: The Children of the Fence Box Set ==
On March 24, 2009 a box set was released containing footage from all nights of Neverender from the New York City dates. It contains a CD and DVD of each night of the concert as well as a documentary entitled The Fiction Will See The Real, both directed by Doug Spangenberg.

== Tour dates ==
Date	City	Country	Venue	Encore
October 22, 2008	New York City, New York	United States	Terminal 5	In Keeping Secrets of Silent Earth: 3, Welcome Home, No World for Tomorrow
October 23, 2008	New York City, New York	United States	Terminal 5	21:13, Gravemakers & Gunslingers, The Suffering
October 24, 2008	New York City, New York	United States	Terminal 5	Everything Evil/The Trooper(Iron Maiden)/Devil in Jersey City Medley, A Favor House Atlantic
October 25, 2008	New York City, New York	United States	Terminal 5	I Shall Be Released (Bob Dylan), Welcome Home, Neverender
October 28, 2008	Chicago, Illinois	United States	Riviera Theatre	In Keeping Secrets of Silent Earth: 3, Welcome Home, No World for Tomorrow
October 29, 2008	Chicago, Illinois	United States	Riviera Theatre	21:13, Gravemakers & Gunslingers, The Suffering
October 30, 2008	Chicago, Illinois	United States	Riviera Theatre	Everything Evil/The Trooper(Iron Maiden)/Devil in Jersey City Medley, A Favor House Atlantic
October 31, 2008	Chicago, Illinois	United States	Riviera Theatre	I Shall Be Released (Bob Dylan), Welcome Home, Neverender
November 5, 2008	Los Angeles, California	United States	Avalon	In Keeping Secrets of Silent Earth: 3, Welcome Home, No World for Tomorrow
November 6, 2008	Los Angeles, California	United States	Avalon	21:13, Gravemakers & Gunslingers, The Suffering
November 7, 2008	Los Angeles, California	United States	Avalon	Everything Evil/The Trooper(Iron Maiden)/Devil in Jersey City Medley, A Favor House Atlantic
November 8, 2008	Los Angeles, California	United States	Avalon	I Shall Be Released (Bob Dylan), Welcome Home, Neverender
December 1, 2008	London	United Kingdom	Astoria	In Keeping Secrets of Silent Earth: 3, Welcome Home, No World For Tomorrow
~~December 2, 2008~~	London	United Kingdom	Astoria	Cancelled due to power cut
December 3, 2008	London	United Kingdom	Astoria	The Camper Velourium I: Faint of Hearts, Cuts Marked in the March of Men, Everything Evil/The Trooper(Iron Maiden)/Devil in Jersey City Medley, A Favor House Atlantic
December 4, 2008	London	United Kingdom	Astoria	I Shall Be Released (Bob Dylan), Welcome Home, Neverender
December 5, 2008	London	United Kingdom	Astoria	21:13, Gravemakers & Gunslingers, The Suffering

== London Astoria cancellation ==
The band were forced to cancel their show at the London Astoria on Tuesday December 2, due to a power cut caused by road maintenance outside the building and the accidental severance of a major power conduit. One worker died as a result of electrocution. As a result, the performance of In Keeping Secrets of Silent Earth: 3 was rescheduled for Friday December 5.

Initially, the VIP Meet and Greet and Acoustic performance were moved to the Friday, but as a fair number of fans were unable to make the new date, lead singer Claudio Sanchez announced on-stage that the Thursday would remain the same and Friday date would feature a cover song set including music by Claudio Sanchez's one-man side project The Prize Fighter Inferno.

== Neverender 12% ==
Neverender 12% Artwork

On February 26, 2009 an exclusive live EP was released only at Hot Topic stores, which contains 6 tracks pulled from the upcoming Neverender set. The tracks were recorded by Michael Comstock at Terminal 5, NYC, October 22–25, 2008, and were mixed and mastered by Mike Major, at Mike's Mix Room, Madeira Beach, FL

Tracks:

1. Gravemakers and Gunslingers – 5:13
2. Delirium Trigger – 4:51
3. The Willing Well II : From Fear Through the Eyes of Madness – 6:39
4. A Favor House Atlantic – 3:31
5. Three Evils (Embodied In Love and Shadow) – 4:54
6. Wake Up – 4:38
