= Davenport Cabinet =

- Origin: New York City, United States
- Genre: Alternative rock
- Label: Equal Vision
- Members: Travis Stever, Tyler Klose, Tom Farkas, Michael Robert Hickey, Rory Hohenberger
- Website: Myspace page

Davenport Cabinet was the solo project of Travis Stever of Coheed and Cambria. It was originally called The English Panther.

== History ==
Under its original name, the band released a self-titled album in late 2006, The English Panther.

In 2008, Stever renamed the project "Davenport Cabinet", after two magicians, the Davenport Brothers of the mid-to-late 19th century. He has stated the reasoning for this as "I realized that I had no connection to the English Panther name. It was a joke name given to me a long time ago and I used it purely out of convenience. Frankly I think the name sucks now. Recently I found a name that is a better fit to the project."

In late 2008, Stever released the album Nostalgia In Stereo as Davenport Cabinet. It contains a mixture of old material written for The English Panther and new songs.

As of 2011 Stever's cousin Tyler Klose joined Davenport Cabinet. He and Stever played guitar and sang.

They released a full-length album, titled Our Machine, on January 15, 2013.

In May 2013, Tom Farkas (bass) and Michael Robert Hickey (drums) joined Davenport Cabinet as full-time members.

The band released an EP titled Risks in Magic on November 13, 2013.

With Davenport Cabinet now having a full band it was time for a full-length album. Damned Renegades was released on September 30, 2014.

The band released one final EP, titled Selfish Angels, on October 14, 2016.

As of 2016, Davenport Cabinet had disbanded.

== Discography ==
- The English Panther (December 22, 2006)
- Nostalgia In Stereo (October 14, 2008)
- 12 inch split with One Small Step For Landmines (June 2010)
- Our Machine (January 15, 2013)
- Risks in Magic EP (November 12, 2013)
- Damned Renegades (September 30, 2014)
- Selfish Angels EP (October 14, 2016)
