= The English Panther (album) =

Studio album by The English Panther
- Released: December 22, 2006
- Genre: Alternative

The English Panther chronology
The English Panther (2006)	Nostalgia in Stereo (2008)

The English Panther is the self-titled debut album from The English Panther, a solo project by Travis Stever of Coheed and Cambria. It was released December 22, 2006.

The cover was designed by Skyler Stever.

Some of the album's songs were leaked in early 2006 under different titles. For example, "American Shmuck" was leaked as "American Cocksucker".

== Track listing ==
1. "Angel On the Shoulder" – 2:46
2. "Storms" – 3:14
3. "Wicked Sun" – 2:43
4. "Threat" – 1:56
5. "Live to Tell" – 4:11
6. "Panther Medley" – 2:50
7. "12 Hours" – 2:49
8. "Ok I Will Drive" – 2:34
9. "All Rite for Now" – 2:20
10. "High Tips" – 1:47
11. "Kiss of a Wrecking Ball – 2:03
12. "Step to the One" – 1:26
13. "Tongue Tied" – 2:58
14. "I Am Tired of Driving" – 3:13
15. "American Shmuck" – 1:45
16. "Modern Math" – 2:04
17. "What???" – 2:17
