= Wes Styles =

American multi-instrumentalist, composer and producer

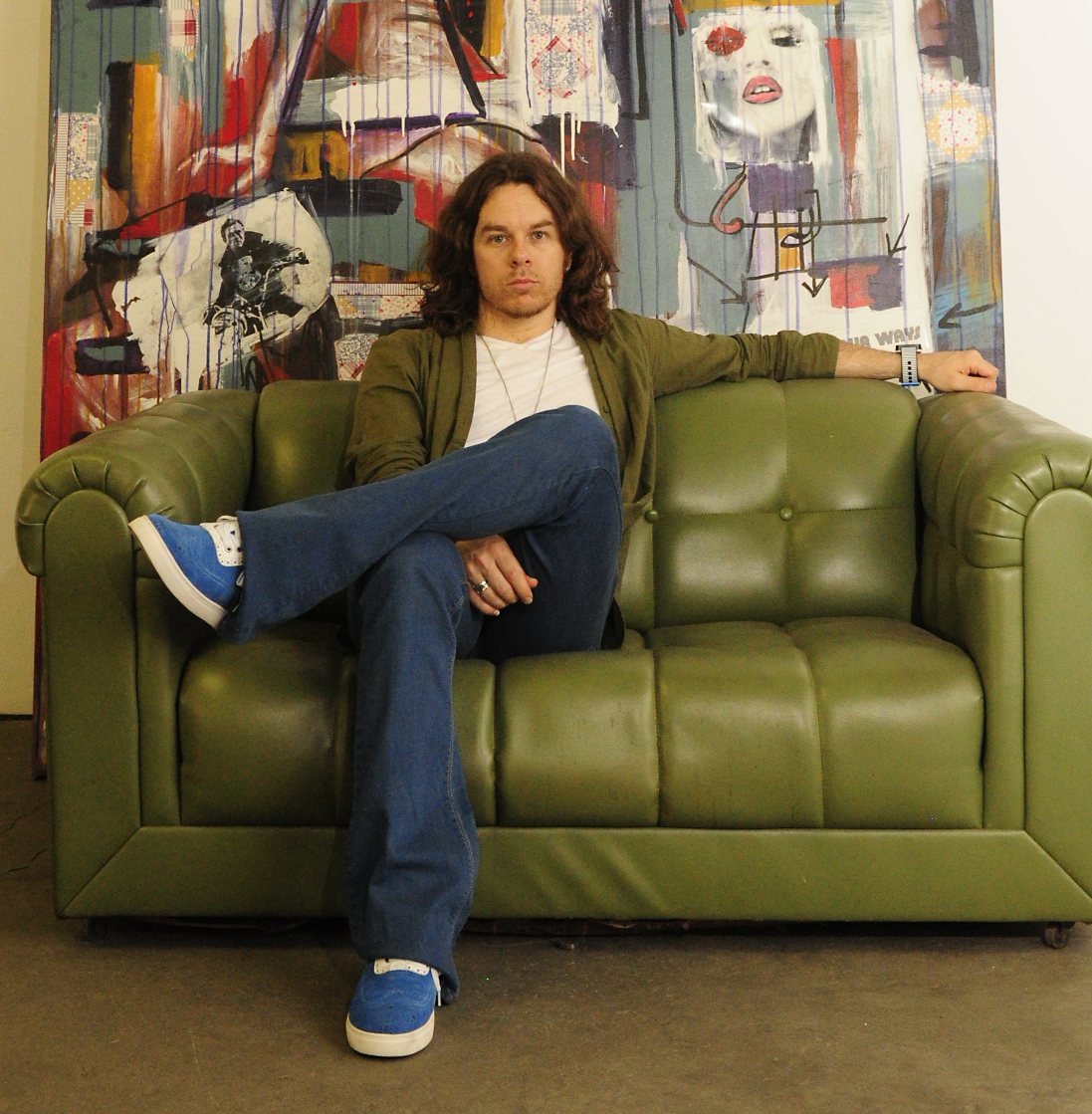

Background information
- Birth name: Wesley Charlton Garren
- Origin: United States
- Genres: Progressive metal, alternative rock, soul
- Occupation(s): Composer, producer, musician, mixing engineer
- Instrument(s): Guitar, keyboards, bass
- Years active: 1993-present
- Website: westunes.com

Wes Styles (born Wesley Charlton Garren) is a multi-instrumentalist, composer, and producer. Influenced by popular music of the late 1970s and early 1980s, his music and production contains elements of many different genres, including funk, rock, pop, soul and hip hop. Styles gained his stage name by playing several different "styles" of music.

== Career ==
=== Florida (1993-2003) ===
After majoring in Instrumental Jazz Performance at the University of South Florida, he was hired as guitarist/keyboardist for Atlantic recording artist Savatage. In October 1993, after a full US and European tour, his stint with Savatage was ended abruptly when founding member/guitarist, Criss Oliva, was killed by a drunk driver. Shortly after Oliva's death, Wes recorded a self-titled instrumental acoustic guitar album (using his birth name Wesley Charlton Garren) dedicated to Criss's memory.

In 1994, Wes won first place in the Best of the Bay guitar competition, in which the prize was a Gibson Les Paul that became his main guitar. In addition to running his own recording studio, giving music lessons, and playing in cover bands, Wes also formed several original bands, including Skunkworks, Ouch, Ramona Ramonster, and Surely T & the Saints of Pain.

In 1999, he was runner-up in Tommy Hilfiger's Unsigned Artist of the Millennium contest. He also briefly played guitar in a rock band that was managed by Orlando bigwigs, Johnny Wright and Lou Pearlman. Before moving to California, he finished production on the first Wes Styles album, Pop Culture Poison, in which he played most of the instruments himself.

=== California (2003-present) ===
Soon after moving to North Hollywood, Wes played keyboards with Ty Taylor. He got signed to an indie label, called Jecarco Entertainment, but left shortly after creative differences with the label CEO, and consequently finished his second Wes Styles album, the Betamax Collection, on his own and released it independently. Wes later played guitar in many acclaimed LA bands such as Sextus, Fantastic Black, J Davey, The Fuxedos, Jeff Fowler, AM/FM and Keram Malicki-Sánchez.

In 2007, Wes started touring full-time as the keyboardist for progressive rock band Coheed and Cambria. He can be seen on Coheed's live Neverender DVD, and heard on their 2010 studio album, Year of the Black Rainbow. He also acted as their substitute bassist in 2011 when Michael Todd was arrested for attempted armed robbery during their tour with Soundgarden.

In 2008, while touring with Coheed and Cambria, Styles became endorsed by Moog Music.

In January 2009, he played in the Neil Sedaka play, Breaking Up is Hard to Do, in which Sedaka made a guest appearance and performed "Love Will Keep Us Together."

== Discography ==
=== As Wesley Charlton Garren ===
- Wesley Charlton Garren

=== As Wes Styles ===
- Pop Culture Poison (2003)

Keyboard Magazine's review of Pop Culture Poison stated that, "if pop culture is truly poisoned, then Wes Styles may very well be the antidote."
Included performances by Matt Mahaffey, Ronnie Dee, and Roger Delillo.

- The Betamax Collection (2008)
- Afterlife (2012)
- The Latter Day Sins (2014)
- Stereophilia (2017)
