= In Keeping Secrets of Silent Earth: 3 (song) =

Single by Coheed and Cambria

from the album In Keeping Secrets of Silent Earth: 3
- Released: 2005
- Recorded: 2003
- Genre: Progressive metal
- Length: 8:12
- Label: Columbia, Equal Vision
- Songwriters: Claudio Sanchez, Travis Stever, Josh Eppard, Mic Todd
- Producers: Michael Birnbaum and Chris Bittner

Coheed and Cambria singles chronology
"Blood Red Summer" (2004)	"In Keeping Secrets of Silent Earth: 3" (2005)	"Welcome Home" (2005)

"In Keeping Secrets of Silent Earth: 3" is a song by American progressive rock band Coheed and Cambria. The song was released as the third and final single from the album of the same name. The song did not chart and no music video was ever produced. The song is a staple of their live shows and one of the most popular cult hits from their discography.

== Story ==
The song tells of the first exchange between Jesse, the leader of the resistance, and Mayo, general for The Red Army.

== Reception ==
A reviewer for AbsolutePunk said the song "[instills] euphoria in the listener." Mind Equals Blown reviewer Jason Gardner, in a retrospective review of the album, called the song "huge" and "emotional."

== Track listing ==
No.	Title	Length
1.	"In Keeping Secret of Silent Earth: 3"	8:12

== Band ==
- Claudio Sanchez – lead vocals, rhythm guitar
- Travis Stever – lead guitar, backing vocals
- Michael Todd – bass guitar, screamed vocals
- Josh Eppard – drums, percussion, piano
