= Starland Ballroom =

Concert venue in Sayreville, New Jersey

Coordinates: 40°26′25″N 74°21′19″W

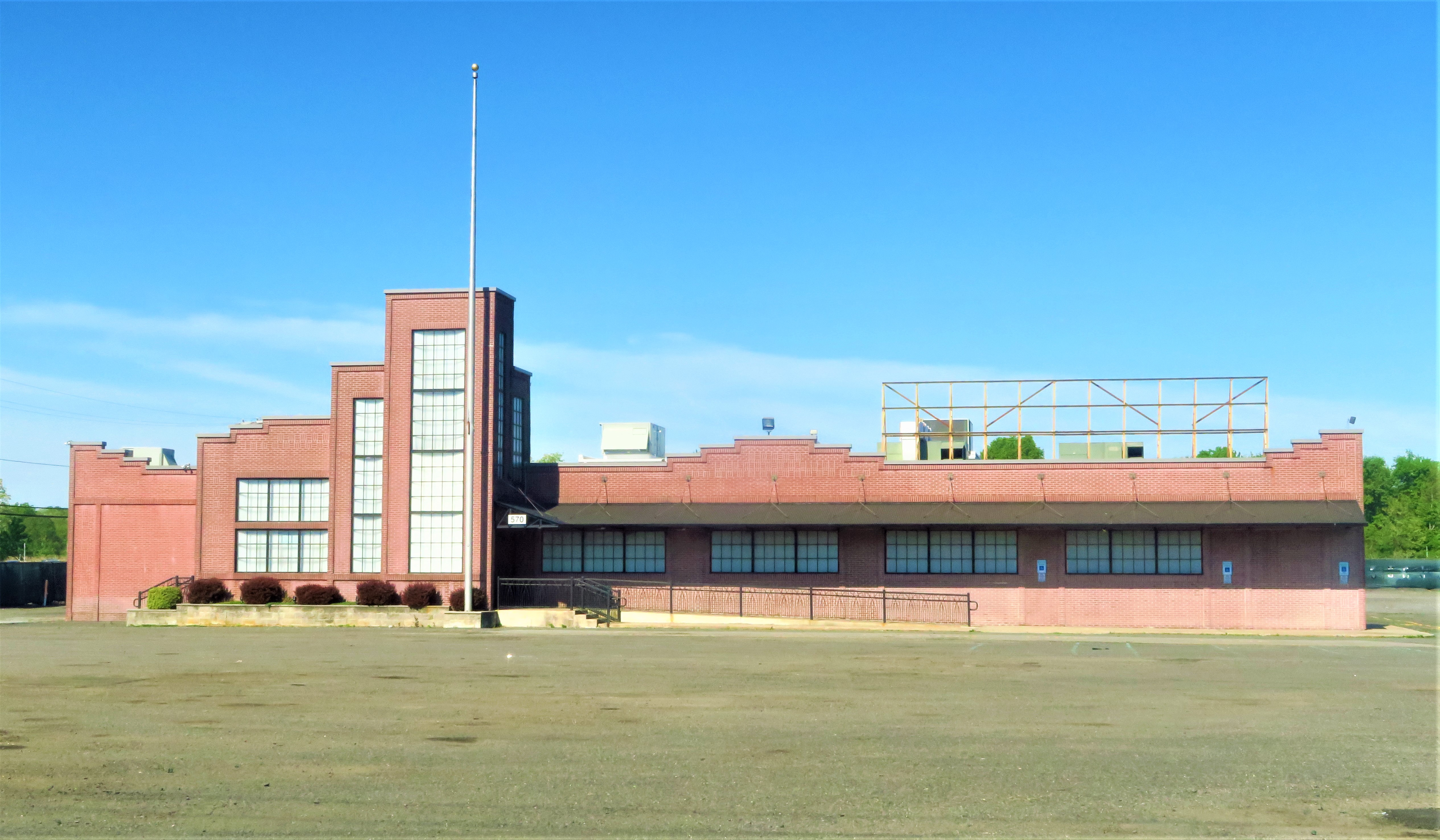
- Exterior of venue in May 2021
- Interactive map of Starland Ballroom
- Former names: Jernee Mill Inn (1962–1982); Willy's (1982–1987); Hunka Bunka Ballroom (1987–2003)
- Address: 570 Jernee Mill Rd; Sayreville, New Jersey 08872-1753
- Owner: AEG
- Operator: The Bowery Presents
- Capacity: 2,000

Construction
- Opened: August 1962
- Closed: October 29, 2012
- Reopened: September 6, 2013

Website
- www.starlandballroom.com
- Building details

General information
- Renovated: November 2012 - September 2013

Renovating team
- Structural engineer: Kipcon Engineering
- Other designers: Heritage Industrial Services, Inc.; M. Silberstein Interior Design; Integrity Ironworks, Inc.

The Starland Ballroom is a concert venue located in Sayreville, New Jersey. Beginning in the 1960s, the building was known as the Jernee Mill Inn, a local bar with a banquet hall. It was originally known as the Hunka Bunka Ballroom and then Willy's in the 1980s. It has operated as a dance music club but more often hosted concerts with primarily metal, punk and ska lineups.

== History ==
The venue opened in August 1962 as a banquet hall and tavern by brothers Chester, Frank and Edward (Rusty) Cholewa. The hall was known as the Jernee Mill Inn, named after the main road near the building. In the late 1970s, Rusty's wife, Phyllis decided to use the space as a concert venue, to fill the gaps in wedding and party reservations.

In 1982, the venue was purchased by Bernie Bailey. During this time, the main hall was used as a rehearsal space, during dark days. Around this time, Jon Bon Jovi and Richie Sambora met at the venue before forming Bon Jovi.

Five years later, Bailey changed the name to the Hunka Bunka Ballroom and dancing became the primary focus of the venue. As Hunka Bunka, the club became one of New Jersey's premier dance clubs, catering to primarily to local, regional and nationally known DJs, the occasional rock band plus live band and track Pop and Dance artists.

In September 2003, Hunka Bunka was purchased by the two owners of the New Jersey–based concert company, Concerts East, Tony Pallagrosi and Jerry Bakal. Within twelve weeks, the club reopened as the Starland Ballroom, with a show by David Lee Roth.

In April 2007, after steering the concert hall into the list of Top 10 ticket selling venues in North America, according to Pollstar magazine, Bakal and Pallagrosi sold the venue to AEG. From 2007 to 2017, AEG Live (now AEG Presents) were the owners and operators of the building. In 2017, AEG Live purchased 50% of The Bowery Presents, with the latter becoming the operator of the venue.

In 2012, the venue was significantly damaged by Hurricane Sandy. The storm caused the Raritan River to flood, with the club being engulfed in six feet of water. The result was damage to the walls, flooring, electrical system and plumbing. The building closed late October 2012, canceling all concerts until March 2013. Renovation efforts began mid-November 2012, with 24 local contractors contributing to rebuilding the club. Renovations include adding a mezzanine in the rear of the main hall, updated lighting, improved sightlines, and acoustics, redesign of the backstage area and the dressing rooms. Flooding parameters were put in place to prevent any water damage in the future.

While the venue was slated to reopen in March 2013, AEG announced the club was set to reopen in September. Tickets for forthcoming events went on sale in June. The grand reopening took place on September 6, 2013, with a concert by Billy Currington.

From 2003 to 2013, the venue sold 1.3 million tickets.

== Events ==
Taking Back Sunday has been hosting an annual Holiday Spectacular every year in December since 2013.

Coheed and Cambria filmed a concert and released it on DVD called Live at the Starland Ballroom.

MTV Classic's That Metal Show filmed at least one episode at the venue.

In 2005, the Starland hosted a pair of concerts to raise money for victims of the December 26 tsunamis. My Chemical Romance, Taking Back Sunday, Senses Fail and dozens more performed over two nights, raising over $150,000 for UNICEF and the International Red Cross.

In September 2005, Dashboard Confessional and Coheed and Cambria co-headlined an event to raise $80,000 for Direct Relief International's efforts to assist victims of the Hurricane Katrina disaster.

== Noted performers ==
- A Tribe Called Quest
- Against Me!
- Airbourne
- All That Remains
- Amon Amarth
- Anaka
- Anthrax
- As I Lay Dying
- Alice in Chains
- Atreyu
- Avenged Sevenfold
- Bad Religion
- Ben Folds
- Billy Currington
- Biology
- Black Label Society
- Blink-182
- Bo Burnham
- Bon Jovi
- The Bouncing Souls
- Brian Fallon
- Bruce Springsteen
- Buckcherry
- Bullet For My Valentine
- Cannibal Corpse
- Chester Bennington
- Chris Brown
- Coheed and Cambria
- Collective Soul
- Childish Gambino
- Clutch
- D.R.I.
- DMC
- Dashboard Confessional
- Death Angel
- Death Grips
- Dierks Bentley
- Disco Biscuits
- Disturbed
- DIY / No Exit
- Dokken
- The Doobie Brothers
- Dropkick Murphys
- E.Town Concrete
- Every Time I Die
- Exodus
- Fall Out Boy
- Finger Eleven
- From Autumn to Ashes
- From Ashes to New
- Garbage
- The Get Up Kids
- God Forbid
- Gogol Bordello
- Good Charlotte
- Green Day
- Greta Van Fleet
- Guster
- Gwar
- HIM
- Hanson
- Hatebreed
- Hollywood Undead
- Huddy
- Iced Earth
- Jackyl
- Jimmy Eat World
- Johnny Maestro & the Brooklyn Bridge
- Justin Timberlake
- Kacey Musgraves
- Ken Carson
- Killswitch Engage
- Kix
- Knocked Loose
- L.A. Guns
- Lamb of God
- Lifehouse
- Mastodon
- Megadeth
- Metallica
- The Mighty Mighty Bosstones
- Misfits
- Mitski
- Modest Mouse
- Motionless In White
- Motörhead
- My Chemical Romance
- Nelly Furtado
- New York Dolls
- The Offspring
- Overkill
- Papa Roach
- Paramore
- Parkway Drive
- Parliament-Funkadelic
- Peaches & Herb
- Puddle of Mudd
- Queensrÿche
- Reel Big Fish
- Rob Zombie
- Ryan Adams
- Saves the Day
- Seether
- Sevendust
- Skid Row
- Skillet
- Slayer
- Social Distortion
- Staind
- The Starting Line
- Streetlight Manifesto
- Sum 41
- Tegan & Sara
- Tesla
- Testament
- The 1975
- Thin Lizzy
- Third Eye Blind
- Three Days Grace
- Thursday
- Toad the Wet Sprocket
- Trace Adkins
- Trivium
- Twisted Sister
- Two Door Cinema Club
- Velvet Underground
- Volbeat
- Warrant
- W.A.S.P.
- WHISKEY TIME MACHINE
- Wiz Khalifa
- Wu-Tang Clan
- Yngwie Malmsteen
- Ziggy Marley

== See also ==
- New Brunswick, New Jersey music scene
