= Nate Kelley =

American drummer (born 1978)

Nate Kelley (born February 15, 1978, in Rockford, Illinois) is the original drummer and backing vocalist for the progressive rock band Shabütie (now called Coheed and Cambria). He is credited on Coheed and Cambria's debut album, The Second Stage Turbine Blade, for the songs "Delirium Trigger", "33", and "Junesong Provision". Kelley, along with Claudio Sanchez, Travis Stever, and Jon Carleo, formed the band Beautiful Loser in 1995. After Stever's departure from the band, it became known as Shabütie. Kelley left Shabütie in February 2000, and the band would be again renamed to Coheed and Cambria after Stever's return and Kelley's replacement with Josh Eppard of 3. He has performed with several other bands after leaving, including Johnny Neutrino and the Secret Weapon.
