= A Favor House Atlantic =

Single by Coheed and Cambria

from the album In Keeping Secrets of Silent Earth: 3
- Released: June 8, 2004
- Recorded: 2003
- Genre: Emo; emo pop
- Length: 3:53
- Label: Columbia; Equal Vision
- Songwriters: Claudio Sanchez; Travis Stever; Josh Eppard; Mic Todd
- Producers: Michael Birnbaum; Chris Bittner

Coheed and Cambria singles chronology
"Devil in Jersey City" (2004)	"A Favor House Atlantic" (2004)	"Blood Red Summer" (2004)

Audio sample
- file; help

"A Favor House Atlantic" is a song by American progressive rock band Coheed and Cambria from their 2003 album In Keeping Secrets of Silent Earth: 3. In the United States, it remains Coheed and Cambria's highest charting song, having peaked at No. 13 on Billboard's Alternative Songs chart. It reached No. 77 on the UK Singles Chart.

The song features the characters Claudio and Al the Killer, and is part of the sci-fi saga that is present in almost all of the band's songs. In contrast to other songs on the album, "A Favor House Atlantic" has been described as a "fairly straightforward [slice] of emo". Vulture.com described the song as a Trojan Horse of invading emo disguised as pop music.

The song is featured in ATV Offroad Fury 3. It was also made available as a downloadable, playable track for the music video game series Rock Band as part of the Bonnaroo Pack. It also appears on the soundtrack to Major League Baseball 2K9.

Variety ranked it as one of the best emo songs of all time in 2022.

== Music video ==
There are two versions of the music video of the song. The first, directed by Christian Winters, revolves around the band in a bar, attempting to pick up women. Meanwhile, an alternate version of the band performs the song on the stage. This version could be considered an "80s" version of the band as they wear typical 80s rock style attire such as headbands and tight clothes.

The video's humor is very tongue-in-cheek featuring antics such as drummer Josh Eppard attempting to look up girls' dresses, bassist Michael Todd in a drunken stupor soliciting the services of a drag queen, and the band insulting itself.

The second version is an animated video, telling a story from the Amory Wars. Rather than being about Claudio and Al the Killer, however, it is about Coheed and Cambria as teenagers.

== Track listing ==
No.	Title	Length
1.	"A Favor House Atlantic" (radio edit)	3:34
2.	"Devil in Jersey City" (live)	4:47
3.	"Delirium Trigger" (live)	5:16
4.	"The Crowing" (live)	4:24
5.	"A Favor House Atlantic" (music video; enhanced content)	3:34

== Charts ==
=== Weekly charts ===
Weekly chart performance for "A Favor House Atlantic"
Chart (2004)	Peak position
UK Singles (Official Charts)	77
UK Indie (Official Charts)	16
US Alternative Airplay (Billboard)	13
US Mainstream Rock (Billboard)	40

=== Year-end charts ===
Year-end chart performance for "A Favor House Atlantic"
Chart (2004)	Position
US Modern Rock Tracks (Billboard)	60

== Certifications ==
Certifications for "A Favor House Atlantic"
Region	Certification	Certified units/sales
United States (RIAA)	Gold	500,000^{‡}
^{‡} Sales+streaming figures based on certification alone.
