= List of The Amory Wars characters =

This is a list of characters in The Amory Wars series.

== Main characters ==
- Coheed Kilgannon (The Beast) - Husband of Cambria, he harbors the Monstar virus which, when triggered, causes the cooling of the star transformers that hold planets in the Keywork. Blades can protrude from his left arm and his right arm is robotic, turning into some kind of cannon. Previously a member of K.B.I. Coheed, who has become the Monstar, is killed by Cambria, "The White Ruineer" at the end of Second Stage Turbine Blade. However, due to unresolved issues between him and Claudio, Claudio sees visions of him during In Keeping Secrets of Silent Earth: 3.
- Cambria Kilgannon (The Knowledge) - Wife of Coheed, she possesses some type of psychic or clairvoyant ability. Previously a member of K.B.I., Cambria becomes The White Ruineer and takes her own life at the end of Second Stage Turbine Blade, just after killing the Monstar (Coheed). She appears in the last issue of In Keeping Secrets Of Silent Earth: 3, using her powers to heal Claudio and take over Al to fight the Red Army.
- Claudio Kilgannon (The Character, The Crowing, Boy, Rabbit, Grover) - Son of Coheed & Cambria and the only known survivor of his family. He wanders the streets of Godder Damm after the events of The Second Stage Turbine Blade. It is revealed in In Keeping Secrets of Silent Earth: 3 that he makes money by stealing the wallets of corpses left by URA soldiers and then selling the corpses to cannibals. He, furthermore, sees visions of his dead father due to his unresolved issues at Coheed due to his anger at the slaughter of his family. After meeting his 'uncle' Jesse, the two plan to destroy Heaven's Fence and kill Wilhelm Ryan. The Prise Ambellina educates Claudio that he is also The Crowing, a messiah who will save the souls of Heaven's Fence by destroying the Keywork; however, he is not willing to accept this fate until the climax of Good Apollo I'm Burning Star IV, Vol.1: From Fear Through the Eyes of Madness.
- Jesse (Inferno) - Commonly referred to as Coheed's 'brother', Jesse (like Coheed) is an IRO-bot. Created in a visual likeness of Dr. Hohenberger, Jesse leads the rebels in war against Wilhelm Ryan. The third member of K.B.I., Jesse is said to have created five new IRO-bots. Jesse is also a Boxer and goes by the name of The Prise Fighter Inferno. Jesse is the only one who knows the truth of everything that has happened so far in the story. He is killed on the surface of Apity Prime (Omega System) by Mayo Deftinwolf. After he is killed, he resurrects on present day Earth to narrate the story of My Brother's Blood Machine and the rest of The Amory Wars.
- Ambellina - A Prise. She (similarly to Newo Ikkin) is sometimes based upon the character Erica Court, but represents the future the Writer could have had with Erica. Ambellina burns off her wings to be more human at the order of the other Prise. This is referenced in the song by Coheed and Cambria, "The Crowing": I will call you out from shelter; burn your wings you'll know no better. She is sent to guide Claudio Kilgannon to his destiny as The Crowing. Like the rest of the Prise, her mission is to watch over the Keywork and see that God's will is carried out. In the Year Of the Black Rainbow novel, she is characterized as being sympathetic towards humans and very rebellious towards Paranoia. She is gruesomely murdered by the Writer at the end of Good Apollo. Ambellina finally dies in Claudio Kilgannon's arms before he fully becomes The Crowing. Her last words are, "I know not much of love... it is not in my make, but if I could've... I would've loved you."
- Apollo - Newo Ikkin's pet dog in The Fiction, as well as The Writer's pet dog in The Real. The story of In Keeping Secrets of Silent Earth: 3 is told by Claudio Kilgannon to Apollo.
- Chase (The Vishual) - An IRO-Bot built by Jesse, she has the ability to hear the Writer as he writes the story. She uses this gift by giving hints to the characters about the future, either in cryptic messages or by directly telling them. She has a body of a 10-year-old and the mind of a mid-20-year-old due to her being given a stimulant by Inferno to speed up her mental growth but not her physical growth. Her role as The Vishual was told in the Book Of Ghansgraad as a signal that The Crowing has arrived.
- Sizer - First appearance is next to Chase at the beginning of the Second Stage Turbine Blade Issue I. He is described as a hulk-like creature and, in the Good Apollo graphic novel, we see a man missing an eye who transforms into a huge beast which is believed to be Sizer. During In Keeping Secrets of Silent Earth: 3, Sizer is heavily wounded in the battle at Silent Earth: 3, and is captured and subsequently torn apart by Mayo. Claudio later finds Sizer's remains in Godder Damm, and proceeds to reassemble the IRO-Bot. Sizer later accompanies Claudio, Ambellina and Al to Si-Revody. In the upcoming "Good Apollo, I'm Burning Star IV, Volume Two: No World for Tomorrow" book, Claudio S. says that Sizer will have more of a central role and is in fact more involved in In Keeping Secrets Of Silent Earth: 3 than most people have come to speculate and believe.
- Wilhelm Ryan - The Supreme Tri-Mage of Heaven's Fence and former Mage of Sector 6. Ryan ordered his top general, Mayo Deftinwolf, and his army to invade Sector 10 of the Keywork ruled by the Mage Rolander Gurash. The Mages demanded that Ryan withdraw his troops, but he refused and killed Gurash, which initiated the War of the Mages. Ryan won the war at the battle of Apity Prime, where he killed his only remaining opposition, Covent Marth, taking 8 of the remaining mages and turning them into the blood thirsty Onstantine Priests. He and Deftinwolf use the Knowledge and the Beast (Coheed and Cambria) in a plot to destroy the remaining threat to his rule, Mariah Antillerea. 6 years after this in In Keeping Secrets, Ryan has made the fates of Coheed and Cambria public knowledge. However, he has manipulated the information to make the couple look like terrorists in an attempt to keep his image well received.
- General Mayo Deftinwolf - Ryan's Top General. He mainly does all of Ryan's dirty work. He orchestrated the deaths of Coheed, Cambria, and the Kilgannon children, and ultimately kills Inferno on the surface of Apity Prime in hand-to-hand combat. Assembled by Gyatronic Technologies Inc. and issued to Ryan during The Second Era (before the Mage War), Deftinwolf was the first Z Class cybernetic organism of its kind. This cyborg was an amalgamation of the defensive traits of the G10 and Y series, fused to create an organism suitable for the military rank and combat. Through years of training and programming, Deftinwolf was positioned as General to what would later be known as the United Red Army (URA). His face was injured in combat with Coheed and Inferno in Year of the Black Rainbow. He is also personally responsible for the death of Dr. Leonard Hohenberger.
- Admiral Vielar Crom- A tall, intimidating character who towers over Deftinwolf and appears to have more military power and higher intelligence. He makes his debut in The Year of The Black Rainbow book, as Mage Covent Marth's General, and may appear in No World For Tomorrow. In "The Year of The Black Rainbow" he is assigned to follow Mage Covent Marth before the start of the Mage Wars. By the end of Year of the Black Rainbow he joins Supreme Tri-Mage Wilhelm Ryan as an Admiral of the URA. In the first half of The Second Stage Turbine Blade, Admiral Crom is appointed to pursue the Gloria Vel Vessa and take over Deftinwolf's post after Coheed and Cambria commandeered the ship. He wears a special armor that is capable of absorbing various kinds of energy from the area around him. He is later salvaged and brought back to life by Wilhelm Ryan, and is used to create a huge robot from House Atlantic.
- The Onstantine Priests - Technically "Zombie-fied" Mages of Yesteryear. After the War of the Mages Wilhelm Ryan had taken 8 of the Mages and created blood thirsty monsters whose main role was to patrol the Keywork in search of "The Crowing." The super human abilities of these monsters range from levitation and shape shifting to physical self-rejuvenation, the latter most clearly demonstrated in Issue III of The Amory Wars. The priests are easily recognized by a high-pitched screech. Towards the end of the first volume and the beginning of the second volume of The Second Stage Turbine Blade they are shown to molt their original forms and change from being unified in their forms to completely independent.
- Mariah Antillerea - Mariah Antillerea is a very mysterious character, and little about her is known. Believed to be conceived immaculately on a riverbank, she was raised by a group of men called the Tra-Nuvis Monks. She is also believed to be a mage sent by God to overthrow Wilhelm Ryan. . She is Jesse's wife and leads the human resistance against the Red Army. She is killed and beheaded by Mayo Deftinwolf.
- Michael - Pilot of the Grail Arbor, Jesse's ship. In the comic he is located on the left, next to Sizer. Named after Michael Todd of the band Coheed and Cambria.

== The Second Stage Turbine Blade ==
- Josephine Kilgannon - Oldest child of Coheed and Cambria and fiancé of Patrick McCormick. An IRO-Bot created by Dr. Hohenberger to serve as the antidote to Coheed's Monstar virus, Josie possesses a telepathic link with Cambria. Josie is assaulted and raped by a gang called the Jersey City Devils. Later, Coheed, deceived by Mayo, kills her by smashing a hammer into her head in front of Patrick.
- Maria Kilgannon - Child of Coheed and Cambria. Twin of Matthew, she is poisoned by Coheed after he was deceived by Mayo.
- Matthew Kilgannon - Child of Coheed and Cambria. Twin of Maria, he is also poisoned by Coheed.
- Newo Ikkin - Claudio's girlfriend/love interest. The name is based upon a former girlfriend of Claudio Sanchez, Nikki Owen. The Writer bases her character on his former girlfriend, Erica Court; Ikkin represents the past that the Writer had with Erica. Claudio Kilgannon later tells the story of In Keeping Secrets outside of her house.
- Longcindia* - Speculation exists as to whether or not Chase created him herself. Longcindia was a malfunctioning IRO-Bot created before The Second Stage Turbine Blade. Shortly after his creation, Jesse incinerated him in front of Chase and Sizer; he was killed because there is no room for error in the final battle.
- Patrick McCormack - Josephine's fiancé who witnesses her murder and flees the Kilgannon's residence upon seeing Josephine die. Patrick is pursued by an Onstantine Priest who kills him, which takes place in the song 33.
- Dr. Leonard Hohenberger - The scientist responsible for the creation of the IRO-Bots Jesse, Coheed, Cambria, and later, Josephine. He implanted the Monstar virus in Coheed, in an attempt to give Ryan the Monstar Virus yet keep him from possessing it completely, and created Josephine in secret as the antidote to the Monstar. General Mayo Deftinwolf refers to Hohenberger as a "terrorist" though through the will of Ryan, Mayo requests Hohenburger to create the Monstar virus. Hohenburger dies by a Pulser blast by Mayo after a failed assassination attempt at the end of The Year of the Black Rainbow.
- Paranoia - A little known Prise who worked with Dr. Leonard Hohenberger in the creation of the KBI. In The Amory Wars, she leads 5 other Prise to visit Mariah on the harsh terrain of the desert planet of Dil-Ariuth IX.
- Dr. Sirius Amory - An astronomer and scientist also known as "the Afterman" who is credited as the discoverer of the Keywork. He is the protagonist of the story of The Afterman albums. The Stars of Sirius are named after him, and evidently the title, The Amory Wars, is taken from his last name.
- Star Cecil - An alien named Cecil of whom Claudio befriends during his early years on Shylos XII. "Star" is the slang name for the alien's race used by the Red Army to dehumanize them. He is accidentally killed by Claudio during the raid of Si-Revody, when a stray energy blast knocks Cecil into the Star-eater.
- The Hearshot Kid - A Star accidentally released by Claudio from a holding cell on the Guile Griever. He is killed, but the story of his demise is used by the slaves on Shylos XII to give them hope.

== In Keeping Secrets of Silent Earth: 3 ==
- Al - A freighter pilot, Al is a psychopath who kills white women who remind him of his lost love, Luci, and keeps their corpses hanging in a room in his ship. He first meets Claudio at a local tavern called the Faint of Hearts, where he offers his ship, the Velourium Camper (sometimes known as the Camper Velourium) to Claudio in a game of cards. Al manages to beat Claudio despite the latter's cheating, which causes Claudio to become enraged and subsequently kicked out of the Faint of Hearts. When Al learns of Wilhelm Ryan's bounty on Claudio, he seeks to befriend Claudio in order to deliver him to Ryan (as Claudio's powers nullify conventional bounty hunting). He later takes Claudio, Ambellina and Sizer out of Godder Damm to Si-Revody to find Cecil. When Ambellina discovers the room full of the remains of Al's victims, Al arrives to knock her out. He is later taken over by Claudio Kilgannon to fight the Reds, and is shot dead during the battle.
- Hack - An IRO-Bot created by Inferno, he can protrude spikes from his body. He fights the Red Army on Silent Earth: 3, but is destroyed in the battle. He is later reassembled by Inferno.
- Many - An IRO-Bot created by Inferno, she can divide herself into multiple bodies. She fights the Red Army on Silent Earth: 3, but is destroyed in the battle. She is later reassembled by Inferno.

== Good Apollo, I'm Burning Star IV, Volume One: From Fear Through the Eyes of Madness ==
- The Writer - Also referred to as The Writing Writer and in the 2017 retelling of Good Apollo Vol.1 he is given the name Ryder, he is the author of the story of Heaven's Fence, referred to as "God" by the people of The Fiction. The turmoil in his own life causes him to become overwhelmed by the story—so much so that he longs for an ending to it. As his stress mounts, he becomes delusional and he begins seeing visions of Ten Speed. At the end of Good Apollo, Volume One, he enters his own story and kills the Prise Ambellina, triggering Claudio the Character's transformation into the messianic Crowing.
- Ten Speed of God's Blood & Burial - The manifestation of The Writer's ill will and malice which takes the form of his 10-speed bicycle. Ten Speed convinces the Writer that he needs to kill off Ambellina in order to end the story, with the argument that if Ambellina is dead, Claudio will become the Crowing and destroy the Keywork.
- Erica Court- The Writer's former lover, whose unfaithfulness causes him to descend into madness and interfere with the story of Heaven's Fence. It is hinted that The Writer once asked Erica Court to marry him (The Suffering), and that at some point in the relationship he turned hostile (Welcome Home). Erica is represented within the Writer's story in the guise of Newo Ikkin (the past, or the bad/evil side) as well as in Ambellina (the future, the good/pure side).

== Other ==
- Covent Marth - Marth ruled Sector 4 of Heaven's Fence. He warned Ryan of a vision he foresaw where Ryan sparked war, though Ryan ignored his warning. Ryan started the War of the Mages and pitted the other Mages against each other, though Marth was ultimately only against Ryan himself. He is killed by Ryan during the final battle of the Mage Wars on Apity Prime, where Ryan emerged victorious and declared himself Supreme Tri-Mage. This occurs in the song Guns of Summer on Year of the Black Rainbow
