= Welcome Home (Coheed and Cambria song) =

Single by Coheed and Cambria

from the album Good Apollo, I'm Burning Star IV, Volume One: From Fear Through the Eyes of Madness
- Released: September 20, 2005
- Recorded: 2005
- Genre: Progressive metal
- Length: 6:15; 4:29 (radio edit)
- Label: Columbia, Equal Vision
- Producers: Michael Birnbaum, Chris Bittner, Coheed and Cambria

Coheed and Cambria singles chronology
"In Keeping Secrets of Silent Earth: 3" (2004)	"Welcome Home" (2005)	"The Suffering" (2006)

Audio sample
- file; help

"Welcome Home" is a song by American progressive rock band Coheed and Cambria, released on September 20, 2005 through Columbia Records. It is the third track on the album, Good Apollo, I'm Burning Star IV, Volume One: From Fear Through the Eyes of Madness. The song was the first single on the album and was made into a music video. The song tells of the hostility in The Writer and Miss Erica Court's relationship in The Amory Wars, according to bandleader Claudio Sanchez. It reached #24 on the Mainstream Rock chart. A 7" version backed by a live-version of "The Crowing" and sold with the album.

The song was featured as a playable track in the game Rock Band, as well as the soundtrack of the Xbox 360 version of Madden NFL 06. It was also the official theme of the re-branded version of NXT between June 2012 and February 2014. It was also included in the trailers of the animated movie 9 and on the film's official soundtrack album.

== Track listing ==
7"

No.	Title	Length
1.	"Welcome Home" (album version)	6:17
2.	"The Crowing" (live from the Starland Ballroom)	6:27

US/EU Promo CD

No.	Title	Length
1.	"Welcome Home" (single version)	6:17
2.	"Welcome Home" (single edit)	4:30

US Promo CD #2

No.	Title	Length
1.	"Welcome Home" (single version)	4:18
2.	"Welcome Home" (edit)	4:30

Digital Single

No.	Title	Length
1.	"Welcome Home" (Shawn "Clown" Crahan remix)	3:51

== Inclusion in Rock Band ==
In 2007, this song was included in the Harmonix music video game Rock Band, exposing Coheed and Cambria to a considerably wider audience. However, the words "whore" and "fucking" were edited to "wolf" and "mucking" respectively. The conclusion of the song was also edited, replacing the fade-out and the strings with a short guitar solo as the player earns the ending bonus points.

== Charts ==
Chart	Peak Position
US Alternative Songs (Billboard)	36
US Mainstream Rock Songs (Billboard)	24

== Certifications ==
Region	Certification	Certified units/sales
United States (RIAA)	Platinum	1,000,000^{‡}
^{‡} Sales+streaming figures based on certification alone.
