= Blood Red Summer =

Single by Coheed and Cambria

from the album In Keeping Secrets of Silent Earth: 3
- Released: November 9, 2004
- Recorded: 2003
- Genre: Emo pop; glam metal
- Length: 4:05
- Label: Columbia, Equal Vision
- Songwriters: Claudio Sanchez, Travis Stever, Josh Eppard, Mic Todd
- Producers: Michael Birnbaum, Chris Bittner

Coheed and Cambria singles chronology
"A Favor House Atlantic" (2004)	"Blood Red Summer" (2004)	"In Keeping Secrets of Silent Earth: 3" (2004)

"Blood Red Summer" is the second single and sixth track from Coheed and Cambria's second studio album, In Keeping Secrets of Silent Earth: 3. A video was recorded and received airplay on MTV, MTV2, and Fuse. The video was on the first preview disk packaged with the PlayStation Portable. The song peaked at 29 on the US Alternative Songs chart.

== Music video ==
The music video of the song (directed by Marc Webb) begins with lead singer/guitarist, Claudio Sanchez, in a cabin in the woods. He is shown setting up alarms and booby traps such as trip wires and spot lights outside the cabin and constructing a fence to surround the cabin. All the while he sees fellow band members Travis Stever, Michael Todd, and Josh Eppard, only to suddenly close his eyes and then they are gone. Claudio is then shown sitting in a store room surrounded by shelves of canned food, batteries, and bottled water, eating Campbell's soup from the can. As he eats, the spot lights come on and Claudio rushes to the nearest window to see his band mates outside running through his traps.

Travis, Michael, and Josh all have glowing, red eyes and move in staggered motions. While looking through a spacing in the wooden door, Claudio fires an arrow from a compound bow which hits Josh in the chest but barely fazes him. The three "infected" band members eventually break into the cabin and surround Claudio, attacking him. Claudio wakes up on the floor in front of a door and seems dazed. As his eyes open they are glowing red as well. The video ends with the four band members staggering off through the woods, possibly in search of their next victim.

== Single track listings ==
=== CD ===
1. "Blood Red Summer" (4:05)

== Song credits ==
=== Performers ===
- Claudio Sanchez (Vocals/Guitar)
- Travis Stever (guitar)
- Michael Todd (bass)
- Joshua Eppard (drums/Backing Vocals)

=== Producers ===
Recorded at Applehead Studios in Woodstock, New York for Ill-Air Productions.

- Michael Birnbaum
- Chris Bittner

=== Mastered by ===
- Roger Lian at Masterdisk

== Charts ==
Chart	Peak Position
US Alternative Songs (Billboard)	29
