= Never Got Caught =

American rock band

Never Got Caught is an American rock band composed of vocalist and guitarist Bryan "Uzi" Hinkley and drummer Bill Hinkley of the Boston hardcore punk band TREE, bassist Jesse Sherman, and guitarist David Ward.

== History ==
The musical style of the band has been referred to as "Blues, jazz, metal, classic rock, punk, and a flair for the experimental all go into the blender to form the seductive, intoxicating, devastating cocktail that is Never Got Caught."

== Discography ==
- Never Got Caught EP (2007)
- There and Back (2008)
- Creepshow (2009)
- I/III (2011)
