= Michael Todd (musician) =

American rock musician (born 1980)

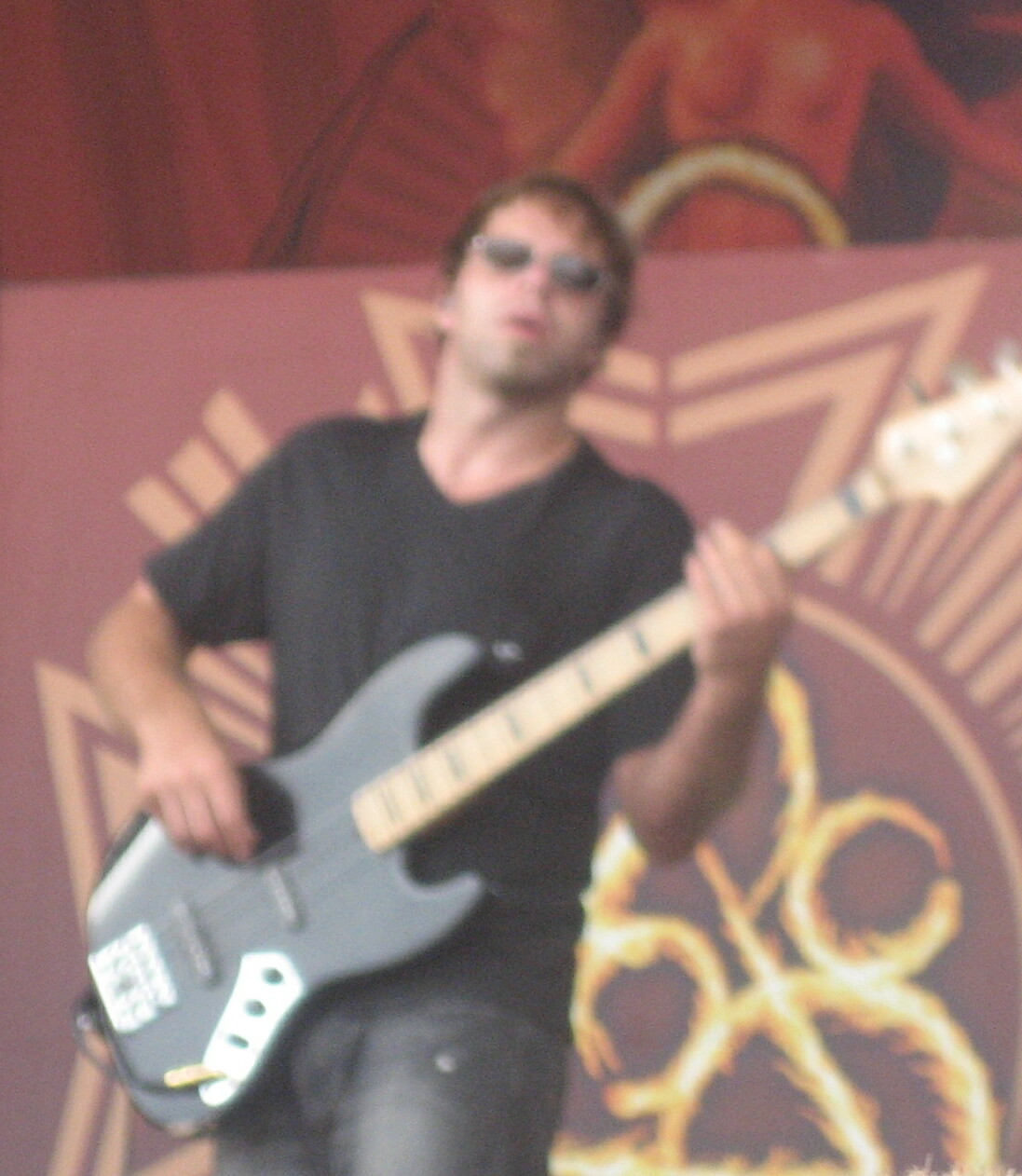
- Todd during the Warped Tour 2007

Background information
- Born: August 19, 1980 (age 45); Kingston, New York, U.S.
- Genres: Rock, alternative rock, progressive rock, post-hardcore
- Occupation: Bassist

Michael Robert Todd or Mic Todd (pronounced "Mike"; born August 19, 1980) is the former bassist for the progressive rock band Coheed and Cambria. Upon the time of his initial departure, he had been with the band for ten years. He officially parted ways with the band in 2011. He then created the band Flux Forteana, formerly known as 'Flux Fortuna', and is now in law school.

== Career ==
When Shabütie needed a new bass player to replace founding member Jon Carleo, drummer Nate Kelley suggested Mic, a former bandmate. Originally a guitarist, he picked up the bass solely for the new band, remaining as they transitioned into Coheed and Cambria.

At the beginning of the 2006 European Tour, Todd left the band due to a growing addiction to heroin and checked into rehab. During the time he was absent, Matt Williams of Jumblehead was Coheed's substitute bassist.

On July 10, 2011, during a tour with Soundgarden, Todd was arrested at the Comcast Center in Mansfield, Massachusetts for armed robbery and unlawful possession of narcotics after reportedly robbing a Walgreens pharmacy in Attleboro, Massachusetts. After his arrest, the band announced that Wes Styles would be taking over bass duties for the remainder of the tour. On June 12, 2012, Todd pleaded guilty to his charges in superior court and was ordered to serve one year of home confinement and three years of probation. On August 4, 2011, the band released an official statement stating that they had come to a mutual decision with Todd to part ways.

In 2012 Michael Todd was diagnosed with cancer.

Todd's solo project is Flux Forteana, a "folksy with some rock" collaboration with guitarist Bryan Hinkley (Clutch, Never Got Caught) and other Boston-area musicians. In an interview with Ultimate-Guitar.com, Todd stated that he had been working on his own music during his hiatus from Coheed and Cambria. He confirmed that he will at some point put out a solo album, and that it will be "more folky and more simplistic" than bandmate Claudio Sanchez' solo project, The Prize Fighter Inferno. He cites female folk singers, such as Ani DiFranco and Ingrid Michaelson, as his songwriting influences.

== Playing style ==
Todd's preferred bass is a Spector Euro model, which was used heavily in the band's music videos and live performances. In the past, he has utilized ESP basses (Delirium Trigger video), Spector basses (particularly the Rebop model), Fender Jazz Bass (Live At The Starland Ballroom); since the Vans' 2007 Warped Tour, Mic has been seen using Fender Jazz and Precision Basses exclusively.

Mic Todd plays bass using the traditional finger approach, fingering the strings with the index and middle finger of his right hand, and more recently with a three-finger approach. He has been known to also use the slapping technique. He often arpeggiated the chords played by guitarists Claudio Sanchez and Travis Stever and makes heavy use of fifths and octaves of the root of the chord being played.

During live shows with Coheed and Cambria, Todd provided the screaming vocals when playing older songs such as "Devil in Jersey City", "Everything Evil", "Delirium Trigger", "Hearshot Kid Disaster", "Junesong Provision", "In Keeping Secrets of Silent Earth: 3", "Three Evils (Embodied in Love and Shadow)", and "The Camper Velourium III: Al The Killer", as well as new songs such as "The End Complete III: The End Complete", "This Shattered Symphony" and "When Skeletons Live".

During live performances he also handled most of the backing vocals and harmonies – notably on "The Suffering", using a falsetto voice (as the original lines were sung by a female friend of the band), and the screaming vocals on songs such as "Three Evils (Embodied in Love and Shadow)".
