= My Brother's Blood Machine =

Studio album by The Prize Fighter Inferno
- Released: October 31, 2006
- Recorded: 1999–2006
- Genre: Folktronica, folk, electronica
- Length: 49:21 (including 66 4–5 second long "air tracks")
- Label: Equal Vision
- Producer: Claudio Sanchez

Professional ratings
Review scores
Source	Rating
AbsolutePunk.net	76% link
AllMusic	link

My Brother's Blood Machine is the first album by The Prize Fighter Inferno, the side project of Coheed and Cambria frontman Claudio Sanchez. It was released on October 31, 2006. "The Missing McCloud Boys" (previously titled "I'm Going to Kill You"), "The Fight Of Moses Early & Sir Arthur McCloud", "Who Watches the Watchmen?", and "The Margretville Town Dance." were previously available to listen to on PFI's MySpace page, and to download via various websites. It peaked at #1 on Heatseekers and 119 on the top 200 billboard. The album is not packaged with a traditional lyrics booklet. Instead, it comes with a series of eight mock-tarot cards with drawings loosely related to the album's story, and the lyrics and production credits printed on the back.

A music video for "Who Watches The Watchmen?" was shot on February 28, 2007.

== Plot ==
My Brother's Blood Machine is connected to the story of The Amory Wars (as told in the Coheed and Cambria albums). My Brother's Blood Machine is told from the perspective of the character Jesse, "The Prise-Fighter Inferno". Writer and singer of the album, Claudio Sanchez explains the story in an interview with MTV News, September 29, 2006.

"Well, this story actually acts as a prequel to the Amory Wars," the center of the Coheed and Cambria mythology, Sanchez explains. "The Inferno character, who appears in the Coheed concept as a man named Jesse, dies in the Good Apollo: Volume One, and is resurrected on present-day Earth. So he leaves the solar system that the story takes place in, and gets resurrected in the present day. But before he can tell the story of the Amory Wars, he needs to tell the story of the Blood Machine."

"The Blood Machine revolves around three families, one being the Bleam family, who are our horrific sort of 'Texas Chainsaw Massacre' family," he continued. "There's the McCloud family — where we have our main character, Cecilia — and the Early family. And [Cecilia's] love interest is the son of that family, Johnny. And there are so many subplots. One, for example, talks about how Cecilia's father happens to molest her, and eventually she can't take it anymore and tries to convince Johnny to leave with her. She steals her two brothers, who happen to be twins, and Johnny decides not to go. So she ends up running away with the twins into the woods, where she meets the Bleam family."

Sanchez said that there are two Bleam brothers — Long-Arm and Butchie — who are horrific monsters. "Their mother happens to be crazy, and she ends up telling these two kids that 'God has come to me with a higher calling for you — you need to be the new Death,' and she tells them that they have to go out and collect souls for God," he explained. "And so, out of their mind, they're like, 'OK, so when a body dies, how do we get the soul out of it?' They construct this Blood Machine, which basically tears a body to shreds, and they think that releases the soul."

== Track listing ==
No.	Title	Length
1.	"The Going Price for Home"	4:04
2.	"The Fight of Moses Early & Sir Arthur McCloud"	2:37
3.	"Our Darling Daughter You Are, Little Cecilia Marie"	3:38
4.	"A Death in the Family"	3:25
5.	"The Margretville Dance"	3:42
6.	"Accidents"	5:14
7.	"Run, Gunner Recall, Run! The Town Wants You Dead!"	3:28
8.	"Who Watches the Watchmen?"	4:16
9.	"Wayne Andrews, the Old Bee Keeper"	2:59
10.	"The Missing McCloud Boys"	3:37
11.	"Easter"	2:43
12.	"78"	4:00
Total length:		49:21

NOTE: "78" is actually track 78, preceded by 66 tracks of silence, called "The Space Between The Songs: I–LXVI".
