= The Prize Fighter Inferno =

American acoustica/elctronica band

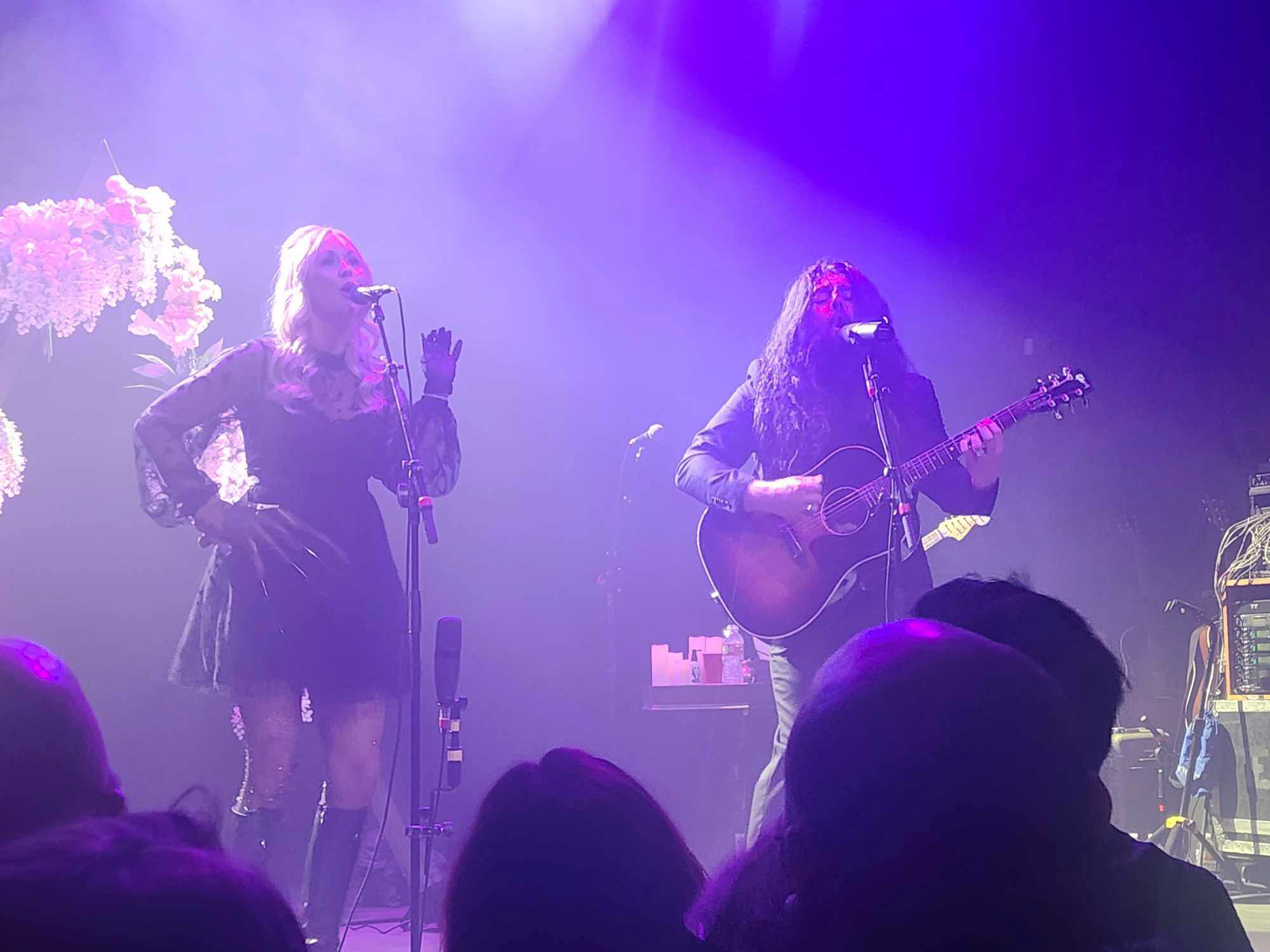
- Chondra Echert and Claudio Sanchez performing as The Prize Fighter Inferno in Denver, 2024

Background information
- Origin: Valley Cottage, New York, USA
- Genres: Folk rock, folktronica, electronica, experimental rock, acoustic
- Years active: 1999–present
- Labels: Equal Vision, Evil Ink
- Spinoff of: Coheed and Cambria
- Members: Claudio Sanchez; Chondra Echert
- Website: theprizefighterinferno.com

The Prize Fighter Inferno is an acoustic/electronica project of Claudio Sanchez, the lead singer and lead/rhythm guitarist for the band Coheed and Cambria, and his wife Chondra Echert. The first album, called My Brother's Blood Machine was released on October 31, 2006, through indie label Equal Vision Records. According to My Brother's Blood Machine liner notes, Sanchez recorded the album over a period of seven years with "...random recording devices...".

== Music ==
=== Early years (2003–2006) ===
Before the first album's release, four official songs were available for listening online:

- The Fight Of Moses Early & Sir Arthur McCloud (released on November 10, 2005, on Myspace)
- The Margretville Town Dance (later changed to The Margretville Dance) (released on November 10, 2005, on Myspace)
- The Missing McCloud Boys (originally called I'm Going To Kill You) (released on November 10, 2005, on Myspace)
- Who Watches The Watchmen? (released on October 9, 2006, on Myspace)

These songs are available on the band's official MySpace page. The first single in the album is "Who Watches The Watchmen?"

A 30-second clip of the song "78" was available on various websites advertising the release of the CD.

- "I'm Going To Kill You" was released on Equal Vision Records' "Inventing The Scene" compilation in 2003.

=== Half Measures EP (2009–2012) ===
On September 25, 2009, A new song called "Gears" was introduced in the trailer of Claudio Sanchez's comic series Kill Audio. When the fourth issue of Kill Audio was released, in February 2010, people who had ordered via MerchNow received a 7" vinyl EP titled "Beaver Records." This EP included "Gears" and the previously unreleased song "Erizo Schultz" featuring Chondra on vocals. The vinyl credits Sanchez and his wife Chondra Echert as "The Prize Fighter Inferno".

An EP was released for New York Comic Con 2012 titled "Half Measures" with tracks: Elm Street Lover Boy, Simple Fix, Pistol Pete Matty, and Half Measures. On Record Store Day, the EP released as a Glow in the Dark vinyl, along with The Afterman: Descension Big Beige Demos in a coke-bottle clear vinyl, and Davenport Cabinet's EP in a blue vinyl.

=== Stray Bullets EP (2020) ===
On March 21, 2020, Sanchez premiered a new song, "More Than Love", on his Instagram page. In April 2020, he announced the song's official release on the Prize Fighter Inferno project's Facebook page on April 3. Later that month, on the 24th, a cover of the Ben E. King song, "Stand by Me" was released to streaming services and digital retailers as well.

In an article from Spin Magazine on May 12, 2020, Sanchez stated, "I figured, if there's any time to do this, it's now. I'll get a bunch of songs together, put a record out, I will feel good, and then get back to Coheed". In the same article, two new songs were debuted from the project, "Death Rattle" and "Crazy for You".

On July 10, 2020, a 5-track EP titled "Stray Bullets" was released; the title track features Weerd Science. (Coheed and Cambria's drummer Josh Eppard's solo rap project)

=== The City Introvert (2021) ===
The second Prize Fighter Inferno album, The City Introvert, released on April 23, 2021 via Evil Ink Records.

=== Virtual Pioneers (2024) ===
The music video for a new single, titled "Virtual Pioneers" was released on February 6, 2024, in anticipation of their first tour. A 2-track single released on February 7, 2024, featuring a reimagined version of "The Going Price For Home".

== Other songs ==
In 2004, a leaked recording of several In Keeping Secrets of Silent Earth: 3 acoustic demos made its way to several P2P networks. Among these were a few Prize Fighter Inferno demos, including "Blood Machine," "Run Like Hell," and "Your Love" (a cover of The Outfield).

On May 25, 2008, a song titled "From China With Love" was posted on the official MySpace along with a short blog entry explaining that Claudio Sanchez was not sure that leaving it off My Brother's Blood Machine was the best idea, and that it was being released online to tide fans over until the next album, which the reader is assured is in the works.

== Live performances ==
On December 5, 2008, Claudio Sanchez performed a solo acoustic show during Coheed and Cambria's Neverender shows in London, UK. The performance of In Keeping Secrets of Silent Earth: 3 was cancelled on December 2 due to a power cut, and was moved to December 5, with Sanchez as the support to make up for the delay. Sanchez played three cover songs, two Prize Fighter Inferno songs, and a new song he had written a few days before. Sanchez gave information on the new song, titled "The Echomaker," saying that it was a demo for a project he and his wife were working on, a musical called "Rosie Barbara and the Family Massacre." The title of the song came from the book of the same name that Sanchez's wife was reading at the time, which he felt fit with the subject of the story. The setlist of that night was as follows:

1. "Your Love" (The Outfield cover)
2. "Purple Haze" (Jimi Hendrix cover)
3. "Wayne Andrews, the old bee Keeper" (PFI song)
4. "The Echomaker" (new song)
5. "Who Watches the Watchmen?" (PFI song)
6. "Faithfully" (Journey cover)

On their 2011 Neverender: SSTB tour, Coheed and Cambria played "Who Watches The Watchmen?" as part of their acoustic set. The first ever Prize Fighter Inferno tour was announced on July 18, 2023, with 11 dates starting February 17, 2024. Two additional shows were added; a new first-ever show on Friday, February 16 in Washington DC & another Detroit show on February 28, 2024.

=== First Tour ===
The first ever Prize Fighter Inferno tour was announced on July 18, 2023, with 11 dates starting February 17, 2024. Two additional shows were added; a new first-ever show on Friday, February 16 in Washington DC & another Detroit show on February 28, 2024.

- February 16: The Atlantis, Washington, DC
- February 17: The Atlantis, Washington, DC
- February 18: Theater of Living Arts, Philadelphia, PA
- February 20: Webster Hall, New York, NY
- February 21: Royale, Boston, MA
- February 23: Saint Andrews Hall, Detroit, MI
- February 24: Lincoln Hall, Chicago, IL
- February 25: Fine Line, Minneapolis, MN
- February 27: Gothic Theater, Denver, CO
- February 29: Rebel Lounge, Phoenix, AZ
- March 1: Troubadour, Los Angeles, CA
- March 2: Independent, San Francisco, CA

== Discography ==
Studio albums

- My Brother's Blood Machine (2006)
- The City Introvert (2021)

EPs

- Beaver Records (2011)
- Half Measures (2012)
- Stray Bullets (2020)

Singles

- "Virtual Pioneers" (2024)

=== Music videos ===
Year	Title	Image	Link	Director	Album
2007	"Who Watches the Watchmen?"			-	My Brother's Blood Machine
2021	"Rock Bottom"			Jenny He	The City Introvert
2024	"Virtual Pioneers"			Ernie Falconer	"Virtual Pioneers" single

== Plot ==
Like the albums of Coheed and Cambria, My Brother's Blood Machine is a concept album that continues the story of The Amory Wars. It contains many of the same recurring themes as the Coheed and Cambria story, such as love, the importance of children, and death. The album is being told from the point of view of the character Jesse, also known as "Inferno" (also referred to in the Amory Wars Comics as "The Prise Fighter Inferno").

The name of the album, My Brother's Blood Machine, is a phrase that appears in Coheed and Cambria's In Keeping Secrets of Silent Earth: 3. This story is set in the past of the universe from the Amory Wars. In an interview with rock-sound.net in 2005, Claudio Sanchez has said that the two stories "do connect, but not in the most obvious way."

The story revolves around the Bleam brothers Long-arm and Butchie who have been socially alienated due to their physical abnormalities and compete for the title of Death. The tale is told in the context of a framework wherein the storyteller is Prize Fighter Inferno, an otherworldly hitchhiker who takes the listener on a tour of Margretville and the Blood Machine.

In an interview posted by MTV News on September 29, 2006, Sanchez went into much greater detail about the plot:

"Well, this story actually acts as a prequel to the Amory Wars," the center of the Coheed and Cambria mythology, Sanchez explains. The Inferno character, who appears in the Coheed concept as a man named Jesse, "dies in the Good Apollo: Volume One, and is resurrected on present-day Earth. So he leaves the solar system that the story takes place in, and gets resurrected in the present day. But before he can tell the story of the Amory Wars, he needs to tell the story of the Blood Machine.

"The Blood Machine revolves around three families, one being the Bleam family, who are our horrific sort of 'Texas Chainsaw Massacre' family," he continued. "There's the McCloud family — where we have our main character, Cecilia — and the Early family. And [Cecilia's] love interest is the son of that family, Johnny. And there are so many subplots. One, for example, talks about how Cecilia's father happens to molest her, and eventually she can't take it anymore and tries to convince Johnny to leave with her. She steals her two brothers, who happen to be twins, and Johnny decides not to go. So she ends up running away with the twins into the woods, where she meets the Bleam family."

Sanchez said that there are two Bleam brothers — Long-Arm and Butchie — who are horrific monsters. "Their mother happens to be crazy, and she ends up telling these two kids that 'God has come to me with a higher calling for you — you need to be the new Death,' and she tells them that they have to go out and collect souls for God," he explained. "And so, out of their mind, they're like, 'OK, so when a body dies, how do we get the soul out of it?' They construct this Blood Machine, which basically tears a body to shreds, and they think that releases the soul."

Sanchez said there are numerous subplots that will unfold as well, including the elaborate background of the Bleam kith: The family's patriarch, a meth addict, dismembers his wife when he catches her pinching from his stash, and her death sends the Bleam boys on a downward spiral toward complete madness.
