= Coheed and Cambria =

American progressive rock band

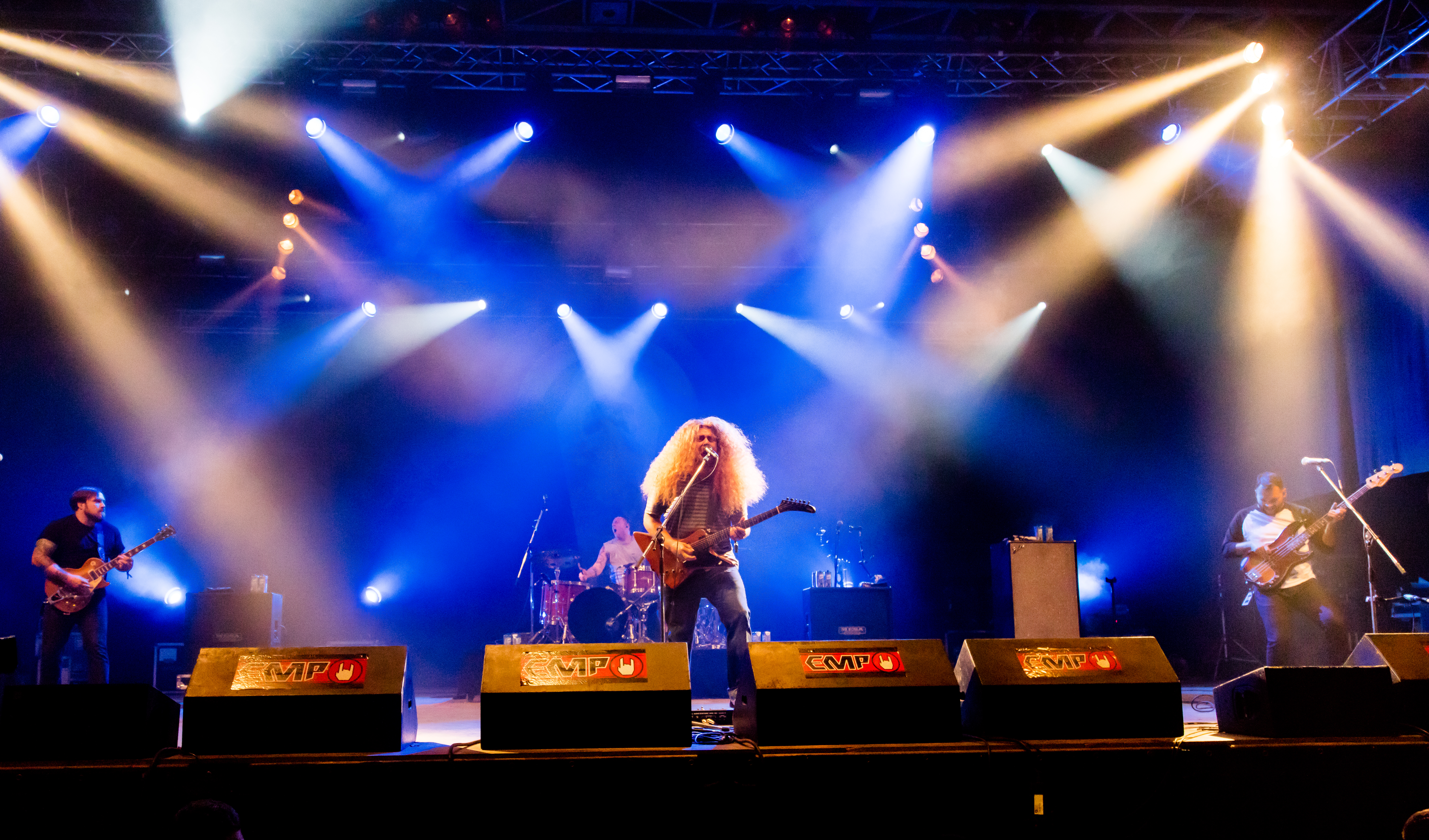
- Coheed and Cambria performing in 2016; Left to right: Travis Stever, Josh Eppard (on drums), Claudio Sanchez, Zach Cooper

Background information
- Also known as: Toxic Parents (1995); Shabütie (1995–2001)
- Origin: Nyack, New York, U.S.
- Genres: Progressive rock; emo; alternative rock; new prog; heavy metal; post-hardcore
- Years active: 1995–present
- Labels: 300; Evil Ink; Hundred Handed/Everything Evil; B-Unique; Columbia; Equal Vision; Roadrunner; Sony
- Spinoffs: The Prize Fighter Inferno
- Members: Claudio Sanchez; Travis Stever; Josh Eppard; Zach Cooper
- Past members: John Carleo; Nate Kelley; Mic Todd; Chris Pennie
- Website: coheedandcambria.com

Coheed and Cambria is an American progressive rock band from Nyack, New York, formed in 1995. It consists of Claudio Sanchez (vocals, guitars, keyboards), Travis Stever (guitars, vocals), Josh Eppard (drums, keyboards, backing vocals), and Zach Cooper (bass, backing vocals). The group's music incorporates aspects of progressive rock, pop, heavy metal, and post-hardcore.

All of Coheed and Cambria's albums except for 2015's The Color Before the Sun are concept albums based on a science fiction storyline called The Amory Wars, a series written by Sanchez, which has been transcribed into a series of comic books as well as a full-length novel. The band has released eleven studio albums, three live albums, and several special-edition releases. Six of their albums have reached the Billboard Top 10. The band's most recent studio album, Vaxis – Act III: The Father of Make Believe, was released in 2025.

== History ==
=== Formation and Shabütie (1995–2001) ===
In March 1995, after the split of Claudio Sanchez and Travis Stever's band called Toxic Parents, they formed a band with Nate Kelley called Beautiful Loser. The band featured Stever on vocals and guitar, Sanchez on guitar, Kelley on drums and Jon Carleo on bass. The group was short lived, breaking up by June 1995 after an argument over gas money. Stever left the band, and the resulting trio was named Shabütie, a word taken from African tribe chants that means "naked prey" in the film The Naked Prey.

The band spent nearly a year experimenting with a multitude of different musical styles, including punk rock, indie rock, acoustic rock, funk, and heavy metal. When Carleo left the band in August 1996, Kelley recruited Michael Todd to take his place. Todd, who was primarily a guitarist, picked up the bass specifically for Shabütie. As Shabütie, the band wrote dozens of songs and released their first studio demo Plan to Take Over the World in 1999. The band also released The Penelope EP in 1999, shortly after which Stever rejoined the band. Shabütie also appeared on the sampler album Error 404: Not Found in July of 1999, which featured their songs Camouflage and Kinderwhore.

Kelley left the band during a performance in late 1999. Josh Eppard (then the drummer of his brother Joey Eppard's band 3) replaced him. The band went on to release Delirium Trigger in 2000, still featuring Kelley on the drums, but listing Eppard in the liner notes.

=== The Amory Wars, The Second Stage Turbine Blade, and In Keeping Secrets of Silent Earth: 3 (2001–2004) ===
"The Keywork", a commonly used logo for the band, symbolizes the energy stream among the planets in Coheed and Cambria's fictional universe.

Several songs that appeared on Delirium Trigger were adapted into a series of science fiction comics written by Claudio Sanchez called The Bag.On.Line Adventures, which was later renamed The Amory Wars. Sanchez's side project originally developed during a 1998 trip to Paris, where the band members decided to rename themselves Coheed and Cambria, named after two of the story's protagonists, and adopted the concept story as a theme that would unify their future albums. This side project also created Coheed's official logo, the Keywork, a symbol for the planetary alignment of the Amory Wars universe.

In February 2002 the band released its first studio album The Second Stage Turbine Blade after signing with Equal Vision Records. Influenced by the post-hardcore group At The Drive In, the band's first release also featured a guest appearance from Dr. Know of the hardcore-punk band Bad Brains as well as the revised "Delirium Trigger", "33", and "Junesong Provision" from the Delirium Trigger EP. The band also released its first single and music video, "Devil in Jersey City". The band eventually played several tour dates in the United States and Japan, as well as a brief stint on the 2002 Vans Warped Tour. In August 2002, Coheed and Cambria started working with manager Blaze James.

"A Favor House Atlantic"
Sample of "A Favor House Atlantic", the first single from In Keeping Secrets of Silent Earth: 3 (2003). The single shows Coheed and Cambria's early emo and pop punk influences.

"The Crowing"
Sample of "The Crowing", also from In Keeping Secrets of Silent Earth: 3 (2003). This sample shows a tendency towards heavy metal music which is found throughout the band's catalog.

Following extensive touring with groups Breaking Pangaea, Linkin Park, and The Used, in October 2003 the band released its second studio album In Keeping Secrets of Silent Earth: 3, also on Equal Vision Records. Featuring the singles "A Favor House Atlantic" and "Blood Red Summer" and corresponding videos which received airtime on MTV, the band supplemented the release by touring with various artists such as Thursday, Thrice, AFI, and Rainer Maria. Coheed and Cambria also made its second appearance on the Warped Tour and performed additional European shows. The album peaked at No. 52 on the Billboard charts and was certified Gold by the RIAA.

=== Good Apollo, I'm Burning Star IV (2004–2006) ===
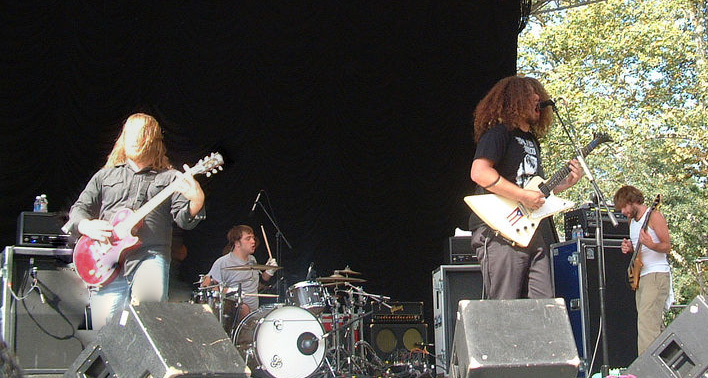
Coheed and Cambria performing live in 2005

The band also supported the release by filming an August 2004 concert at New Jersey's Starland Ballroom. The performance was converted into the band's first live DVD, Live at the Starland Ballroom, which was released in March 2005.

The success of In Keeping Secrets of Silent Earth: 3 attracted the attention of the record label Columbia Records, with whom they signed a multi-album contract. The band stopped touring to record their third studio album and first major-label release Good Apollo, I'm Burning Star IV, Volume One: From Fear Through the Eyes of Madness in early 2005 for a September 2005 release.

"Welcome Home"
A sample of "Welcome Home" from Good Apollo, I'm Burning Star IV, Volume One: From Fear Through the Eyes of Madness

Their most commercially successful album to date, Good Apollo Volume One has sold almost 1 million copies and peaked at No. 7 on the Billboard charts. The album represented a departure from their previous melodic post-hardcore influenced rock toward a progressive rock sound. The single "Welcome Home" was described by John A. Hanson as "a heavily Led Zeppelin-influenced metal tune". The band supported the album with American and European tours accompanied by The Blood Brothers, Circa Survive, Dredg, Head Automatica, and Avenged Sevenfold, tours culminating in the release of the exclusive iTunes EP Kerrang!/XFM UK Acoustic Sessions and their second live DVD The Last Supper: Live at Hammerstein Ballroom.

=== Departures and No World for Tomorrow (2006–2009) ===
Claudio Sanchez released an album from his side-project The Prize Fighter Inferno in October 2006 titled My Brother's Blood Machine. Like Coheed and Cambria's albums, it was a concept album, related to Coheed and Cambria via a character that appears in both stories: Jesse, "The Prize Fighter Inferno". The album was intended to be a prequel to the Coheed and Cambria albums. Claudio says "when we were called Shabütie, the initial idea for Coheed and Cambria was to be an acoustic/electronic side project. So I guess The Prize Fighter Inferno is kind of the original idea for Coheed and Cambria."

In early November 2006, Josh Eppard and Michael Todd left the band for personal reasons, forcing Matt Williams and the band's drum technician, Michael Petrak, to fill out temporarily the band's rhythm section for a handful of shows. In April 2007, bassist Michael Todd rejoined Coheed and Cambria, and the band entered the Los Angeles-based studio with new producer Nick Raskulinecz. The following June Chris Pennie, formerly of the Dillinger Escape Plan, joined Coheed and Cambria as its drummer, but due to contractual restrictions with his previous record label, Pennie did not appear on the band's fourth release. Instead, Foo Fighters drummer Taylor Hawkins recorded the drums, making use of several ideas Pennie had previously written in correspondence with Sanchez.

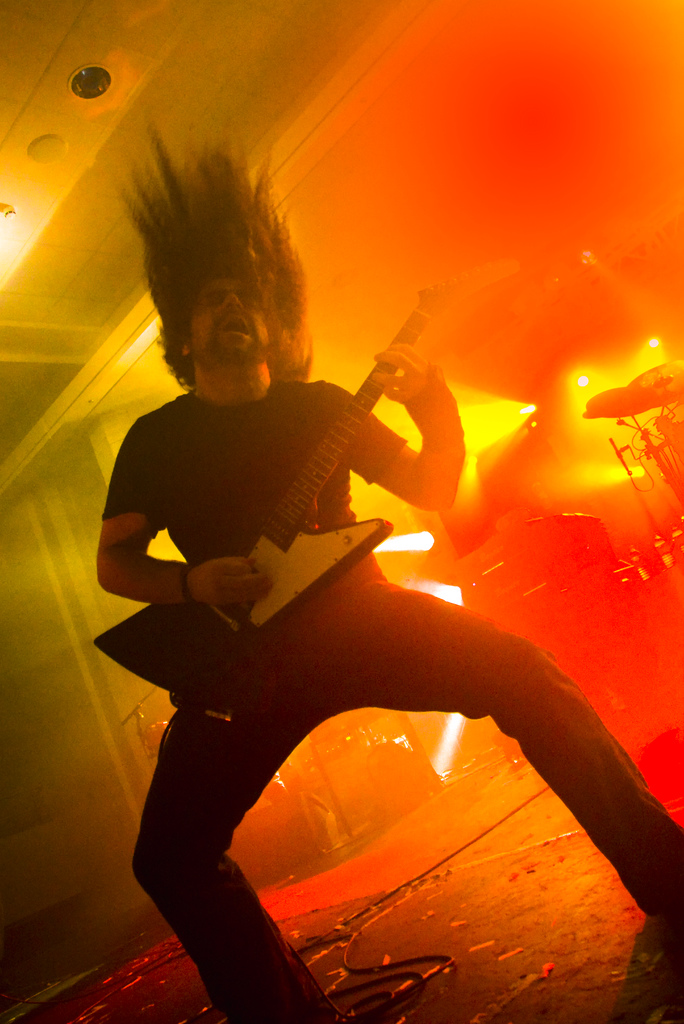
Claudio Sanchez during the Kerrang! Tour 2008

The band's fourth studio album, and second release with Columbia Records, Good Apollo, I'm Burning Star IV, Volume Two: No World for Tomorrow, was released in October 2007, debuting at number 6 on the Billboard charts. The album's first single, "The Running Free", was released to radio in August 2007. The second single was "Feathers" with a video starring Rena Riffel. The band continued touring, headlining portions of the 2007 Warped Tour, a tour supported by Clutch and The Fall of Troy, and opened for Linkin Park's 25-city U.S. tour, which forced the cancellation of Coheed and Cambria's performances on Australia's Soundwave Festival. In addition to the return of Todd on bass and new drummer Pennie, the band also recruited a touring keyboardist and backup vocalists for its live performances.

In November 2007, their song "Welcome Home" was included as a playable track in the video game Rock Band, and a cover of their song "Ten Speed (of God's Blood & Burial)" was later made available as a download for Rock Band. In 2009 two more songs were made available for download, "The Running Free" and "A Favor House Atlantic", for the video game Rock Band, later joined in 2010 by the songs "Guns of Summer", "Here We Are Juggernaut" and "The Broken".

The band prepared a four-month world tour beginning in January 2008. They later headlined at The Bamboozle 2008 music festival.

The band headlined the 2008 Kerrang! Tour in the U.K., where the band performed and recorded a cover of "The Trooper" by Iron Maiden, which is featured on Kerrang!'s Iron Maiden tribute album, Maiden Heaven, that came with the July 16 issue. They were nominated for Best International Band and Best Music Video (for Feathers) in the 2008 Kerrang! Awards.

In October and November 2008, the band played Neverender, a four-night concert series in which the band played one album per night. The event was held in New York City, Chicago, Los Angeles, and in London in early December. Neverender: Children of The Fence Edition, a CD/DVD box set of their Neverender performance, was released on March 24, 2009.

=== Year of the Black Rainbow (2009–2011) ===
Coheed and Cambria toured through most of early 2009. Between January and March, they toured with Slipknot and Trivium on the Slipknot-headlined All Hope Is Gone tour. In August 2009, Coheed and Cambria toured in support of Heaven & Hell on their tour in support of The Devil You Know. On September 16, 2009, they performed at the Puyallup Fair alongside Brand New and Jaguar Love. In October they performed at the Austin City Limits Music Festival in Austin, Texas. They also performed at the Wacken Open Air festival, at the UK leg of the Sonisphere Festival tour, and at the Lollapalooza festival in Chicago, Illinois.

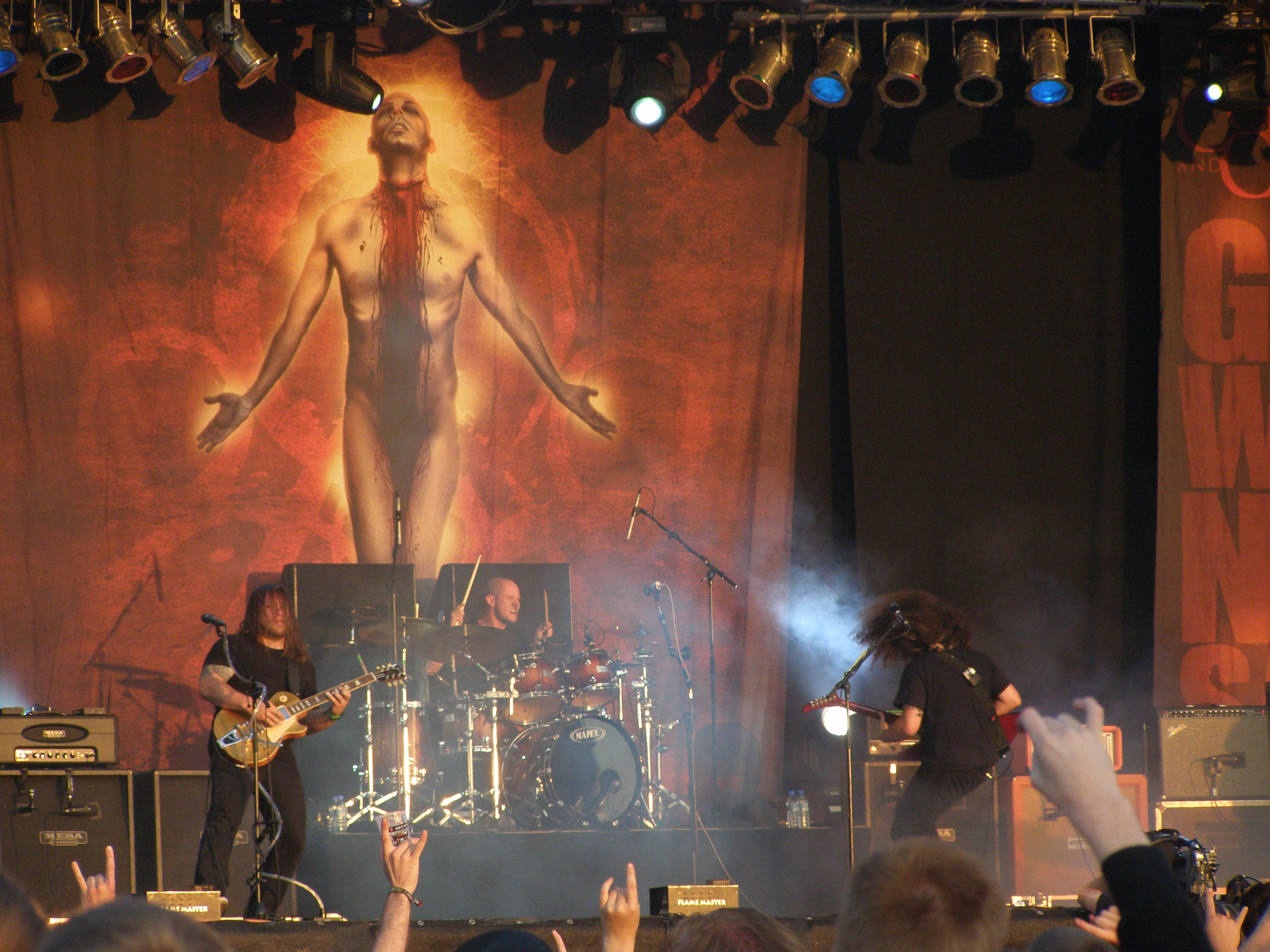
Coheed and Cambria performing live in 2009

Coheed and Cambria finished recording their fifth studio album Year of the Black Rainbow in 2009. It is a prequel to their conceptual story, having events that take place before The Second Stage Turbine Blade. A novel was released to accompany the album co-written by Sanchez and Peter David. The album was released on April 13, 2010, in both a standard, iTunes special, and deluxe edition (with the deluxe edition including the Year of the Black Rainbow novel and a special Year of the Black Rainbow "black card" that provided the holder early access to some Coheed shows. The concept of a special card with this privilege would carry over into future album releases). In 2010 the band played the UK rock festival Download, alongside A Day to Remember and Bullet for My Valentine.

"The Broken", "Guns of Summer" and "Here We Are Juggernaut" were released on the Rock Band music store on April 20, 2010.

Sanchez stated that with the Coheed and Cambria saga completely chronicled on the group's first five albums, he was contemplating the direction of future releases. "I've thought of telling stories of the future and stories of the past, maybe getting involved more in the story of Sirius Amory (sic – Sirius Amory in the stories), the fellow who figured out the value of the Keywork," he said. "Or even stories that kind of parallel the one that we're telling. It's kind of up in the air. I've started writing music for that next record, and I'm kind of hoping that maybe in doing that it's going to tell me which one to do."

On July 10, 2011, bassist Michael Todd was arrested and taken into police custody in Attleboro, Massachusetts, on charges of armed robbery. Wes Styles acted as a temporary replacement for the remaining dates. On August 4, 2011, Todd and the band parted ways by mutual decision.

The band recorded a cover of the ZZ Top song "Beer Drinkers & Hell Raisers" for the tribute album A Tribute from Friends, and the song "Deranged" was released on the soundtrack for the video game Batman: Arkham City on October 18, 2011.

=== Line-up change and The Afterman (2011–2014) ===
Claudio announced at New York Comic Con in "Radio.com" in October 2011 that the upcoming album was written and that the recordings would begin in November. He also confirmed that the band were continuing to write music following the Amory Wars storyline, hinting that fans would be surprised by which character was followed in the new album.

In November 2011, Chris Pennie departed the band by mutual agreement due to creative differences. Two weeks later, Pennie was replaced by the band's former drummer Josh Eppard, and the following April, the band announced via social media that their replacement bassist would be Zach Cooper, previously of the band AM to AM. According to an interview with Cooper, Coheed manager Blaze James "cold-called" Cooper to audition for the bass position based upon a personal recommendation.

In June, the band completed the recording of their sixth studio album at Applehead Studios. The following month, Coheed announced via their website that the upcoming album would be a double album called "The Afterman." The first part, titled The Afterman: Ascension, was released on October 9, 2012, and the second, titled The Afterman: Descension, was released on February 5, 2013. It was produced by Coheed and Cambria, with Michael Birnbaum and Chris Bittner. 'The Afterman' tells the story of Sirius Amory, the namesake of the concept, as he explores the energy source holding together the Keywork (the 78 worlds in which The Amory Wars is set) and finds that it is in fact an afterlife for departed souls. In the same month, Claudio announced at San Diego Comic-Con that Entourage producers Mark Wahlberg and Stephen Levinson would be developing his comic book series The Amory Wars into a full-length live action film. In September 2019, Sanchez revealed that Wahlberg's agreement to produce the project had expired.

On August 28, 2012, the band released the music video for "Key Entity Extraction I: Domino the Destitute", the first single from The Afterman: Ascension, on their Vevo channel, reaching over one million views. Two weeks before the album's release, the band premiered the studio version of the title track "The Afterman" on Rolling Stone. The second video from the album was later created for this track. In 2013, the band released videos for "Dark Side of Me" and "Number City", from The Afterman: Descension.

On August 18, 2014, it was revealed on a Billboard.com article that Coheed and Cambria would be releasing a remastered version of In Keeping Secrets of Silent Earth: 3 on October 21, including some interview questions about why they were releasing it, and premiering the remastered version of the single "A Favor House Atlantic" from that album.

On August 25, 2014, a video of Claudio playing a new song titled "Atlas" was uploaded to the band's YouTube channel.

In September and October 2014, Coheed and Cambria went on tour with Thank You Scientist, playing In Keeping Secrets of Silent Earth: 3 in its entirety in correspondence with its remastering. In February 2015, it was announced on BBC Radio 1 that the band would be performing "In Keeping Secrets of Silent Earth: 3" at Hevy Fest held at Port Lympne, Kent, England.

=== The Color Before the Sun (2015–2017) ===
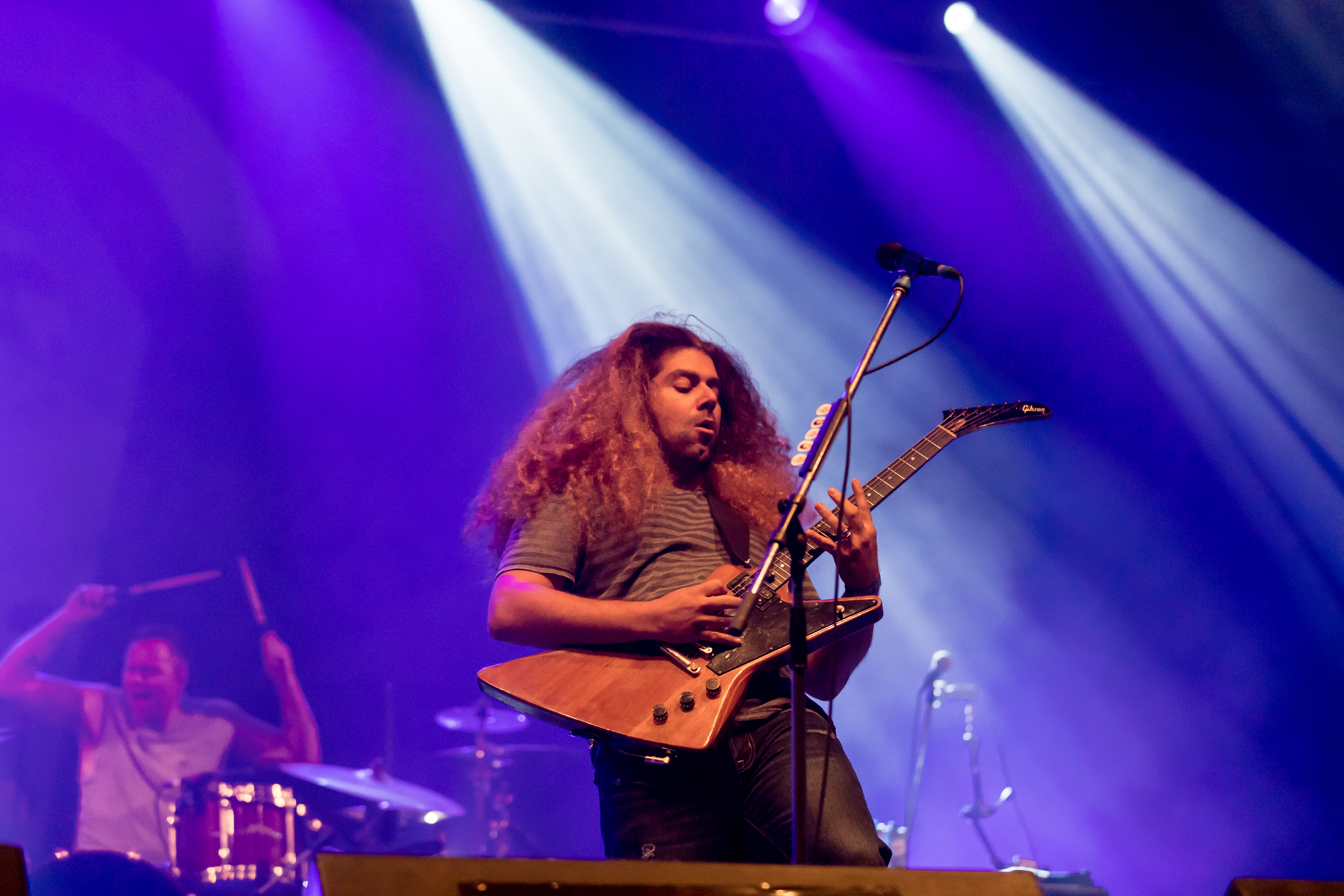
Coheed and Cambria performing live at Summer Breeze Open Air in 2016

In an interview, Claudio Sanchez stated that he hoped to take Coheed and Cambria into the studio during January 2015 for a spring or summer release.

The band's eighth album, The Color Before the Sun, was released on October 16, 2015. It is the band's first album not connected to The Amory Wars storyline. Instead, the album reflects on Sanchez's recent events in his life, such as moving from the country to the city, as well as his child Atlas. The album's first single, "You Got Spirit, Kid" was released on July 10, 2015. The second single, "Here to Mars", was released on September 3, 2015.

The band embarked on an early 2016 U.S. tour with Glassjaw, I the Mighty, and Silver Snakes, and a late 2016 U.S. tour with Saves the Day and Polyphia.

On August 19, 2016, the band released a Deconstructed version of the album which includes demos of the tracks as well as live recordings.

=== Vaxis – Act I: The Unheavenly Creatures (2018–2020) ===
On February 20, 2018, the band announced a summer tour with Taking Back Sunday and The Story So Far.

It was announced on April 5, 2018, that the band had signed with Roadrunner Records and released a teaser potentially for a new album set to release in 2018. The band decided to premiere a new song after a show at the Chameleon Club in Lancaster, PA on May 5, 2018. After videos of the song went viral among fans on YouTube the band decided to premiere the video for a new song, "The Dark Sentencer" along with the album's "Prologue" (the album's backstory), on May 31, 2018, against their promotional plan set forth by Roadrunner Records. On June 22, 2018, the band announced their new album, Vaxis – Act I: The Unheavenly Creatures, would be released October 5, 2018. It continues the Amory Wars storyline that the band's first seven albums followed. The second song on the album, "Unheavenly Creatures", was released on June 28. A third single, "The Gutter", was released on August 16. A fourth, "Old Flames", was released on September 27. A fifth, "Love Protocol", made its debut on BBC Radio 1 on September 30.

The band embarked on an early 2019 tour with Maps & Atlases. On February 12, 2019, the band announced The Unheavenly Skye Tour, co-headlined with Mastodon and featuring special guests Every Time I Die.

On August 21, 2020, the band released "Jessie's Girl 2", a sequel to Rick Springfield's 1981 song, "Jessie's Girl", featuring Springfield on the recording. The song was released on both a red and blue 7" vinyl on September 4. According to an article by Entertainment Weekly, the band reportedly has considered releasing a whole album called Sequels entirely composed of sequels to other songs.

=== Vaxis – Act II: A Window of the Waking Mind (2021–2024) ===
In early 2021, the band announced a tour co-headlining with The Used. On July 21, 2021, they released the lead single, "Shoulders", from their tenth studio album. The album continues the Amory Wars "Vaxis" saga from the previous album, though frontman Claudio Sanchez noted that parts of the story were still in flux as some plot points felt insensitive in the wake of the COVID-19 pandemic, such as a song titled "Hallelujah Quarantine" written before the pandemic, centered around a "celebration called The Quarantine. It's almost like a cotillion where the young come to party and to decide their fates. But this organization is really just taking these young kids to use them as blood banks." On November 10, 2021, the band released their new album's second single, "Rise, Naianasha (Cut the Cord)". In December 2021, the band announced The Great Destroyer Tour with Sheer Mag, to take place in February and March 2022. In January 2022, the band announced the title and track listing of their tenth album: Vaxis – Act II: A Window of the Waking Mind, which released on June 24, 2022, to critical acclaim. A third single, "The Liars Club", was released on February 22, 2022. The next day, the band announced the A Window of the Waking Mind Tour with Dance Gavin Dance and Mothica. A fourth single, "Comatose", was released on May 18, 2022, and the band added European tour dates with Thrice and Touché Amoré. Due to sexual assault allegations against Dance Gavin Dance singer Tilian Pearson and his departure from the band, Alkaline Trio replaced Dance Gavin Dance on the A Window of the Waking Mind tour. On January 24, 2023, the band announced the Neverender: No World for the Waking Mind Tour with Deafheaven. On February 6, 2024, the band announced a tour supporting Incubus, and on February 20, they announced a co-headlining tour with Primus. On May 8, 2024, the band released a new song, "The Joke", a track cut from Vaxis – Act II.

=== Vaxis – Act III: The Father of Make Believe (2024–present) ===
On July 12, 2024, the band premiered a new song, "Blind Side Sonny", on tour. They released a music video for the song on October 2, 2024. On November 20, the band revealed the title of their eleventh studio album, Vaxis – Act III: The Father of Make Believe, the full tracklisting, and second single, "Searching for Tomorrow", along with a release date of March 14, 2025. On December 9, 2024, the band announced the Infinite Arc Tour with Mastodon and Periphery. On January 14, 2025, the band released the single "Someone Who Can" and announced a second leg to their 2025 tour with Taking Back Sunday and Foxing. On June 3, 2025, the band announced the Welcome to Forever Tour, a UK and European tour with Haken.

On September 10, 2025, the band announced a deluxe edition of Vaxis – Act III, called the New Entities Edition, with four new tracks that was released on October 3, 2025. In February 2026, the band was confirmed to be on the roster for the Louder Than Life festival taking place in Louisville in September.

== Musical style and influences ==
The band's style is described as progressive rock by Equal Vision, Spin, and AllMusic. Songs such as "Blood Red Summer" and "Three Evils (Embodied in Love and Shadow)" have been noted in many reviews of the band also to contain several elements of pop, as exemplified by one review by Sputnikmusic which says "Coheed and Cambria manage to bring new life to a dying genre, and mix up the standard pop-punk scheme with creative and original riffs." The band has also been described as alternative rock, new prog, progressive metal, emo, post-hardcore, and alternative metal.

Sanchez has stated that he is envious of his father's era of music, with the band being influenced by groups of that era such as Led Zeppelin, Pink Floyd, The Police, Queen, and Thin Lizzy. Sanchez also acknowledges an eclectic array of influences, including post-hardcore group At the Drive-In and heavy metal pioneers Iron Maiden.

One of the biggest influences for Coheed and Cambria was alternative metal band Faith No More. Before establishing the band, Sanchez and Stever got hold of their 1992 record Angel Dust, which Stever claimed "showed [them] the light", and they would later listen to King for a Day and Album of the Year continually as well. Stever also stated "There are many more songs that we have done through the years that have had a guitar part or vocal melody that I will say, 'Oh shit - there's that Faith No More influence'."

Contrary to rumors, bassist Michael Todd said the band was not influenced by Saga and that he had never heard of that group. Many draw similarities between Rush and Coheed and Cambria, but Josh Eppard stated in an interview that neither he nor the other band members were "big" Rush fans. Claudio later stated he began to listen more critically to Rush's albums after the comparisons.

Influences of punk rock have been cited as well, especially the Misfits and Bad Brains. Dr. Know of Bad Brains plays a guitar solo on the track "Time Consumer" from Second Stage Turbine Blade. Sanchez and Stever's early band Toxic Parents drew many similarities from Jane's Addiction and Misfits.

Sanchez has stated that The Amory Wars, the story on which Coheed and Cambria base its lyrics, has similarities to other stories, especially to the Star Wars trilogy. For example, when the character Coheed returns home to his wife Cambria, she says, "Somehow I've always known," a line that Princess Leia said to Luke Skywalker in Return of the Jedi.

== Band members ==
Current members

- Claudio Sanchez – lead vocals, guitar (1995–present), keyboards (2003–present), backing vocals (1995)
- Travis Stever – guitar (1995, 1999–present), backing vocals (1999–present), lead vocals (1995)
- Josh Eppard – drums, percussion, backing vocals, keyboards (2000–2006, 2011–present)
- Zach Cooper – bass, backing vocals (2012–present)

Former members

- Jon Carleo – bass (1995–1996)
- Nate Kelley – drums, backing vocals (1995–2000)
- Michael Todd – bass, backing vocals (1996–2006, 2007–2011)
- Chris Pennie – drums (2007–2011)

Former touring musicians

- Dave Parker – keyboards (2005–2006)
- Matt Williams – bass (2006–2007)
- Michael Petrak – drums (2006–2007)
- Kelly Fauth – backing vocals (2007–2010)
- Halina Larsson – backing vocals (2007–2010)
- Wes Styles – keyboards (2007–2010), bass (2011)

Session musicians

- Taylor Hawkins – drums (2007; died 2022)

== Discography ==
- The Second Stage Turbine Blade (2002)
- In Keeping Secrets of Silent Earth: 3 (2003)
- Good Apollo, I'm Burning Star IV, Volume One: From Fear Through the Eyes of Madness (2005)
- Good Apollo, I'm Burning Star IV, Volume Two: No World for Tomorrow (2007)
- Year of the Black Rainbow (2010)
- The Afterman: Ascension (2012)
- The Afterman: Descension (2013)
- The Color Before the Sun (2015)
- Vaxis – Act I: The Unheavenly Creatures (2018)
- Vaxis – Act II: A Window of the Waking Mind (2022)
- Vaxis – Act III: The Father of Make Believe (2025)

== Awards ==
Year	Award	Category
2004	MTVU Woodie Award	Soundtrack of My Life Woodie (Best Album) (In Keeping Secrets of Silent Earth: 3)
2004	MTVU Woodie Award	The Road Woodie (Best Live Performance)
2006	Metal Hammer Golden Gods Awards	Best Album (Good Apollo, I'm Burning Star IV, Volume One: From Fear Through the Eyes of Madness)
2008	Kerrang! Awards	Best Music Video ("Feathers")
2010	MTV Musical March Madness	Championship Title
