= Travis Stever =

American guitarist

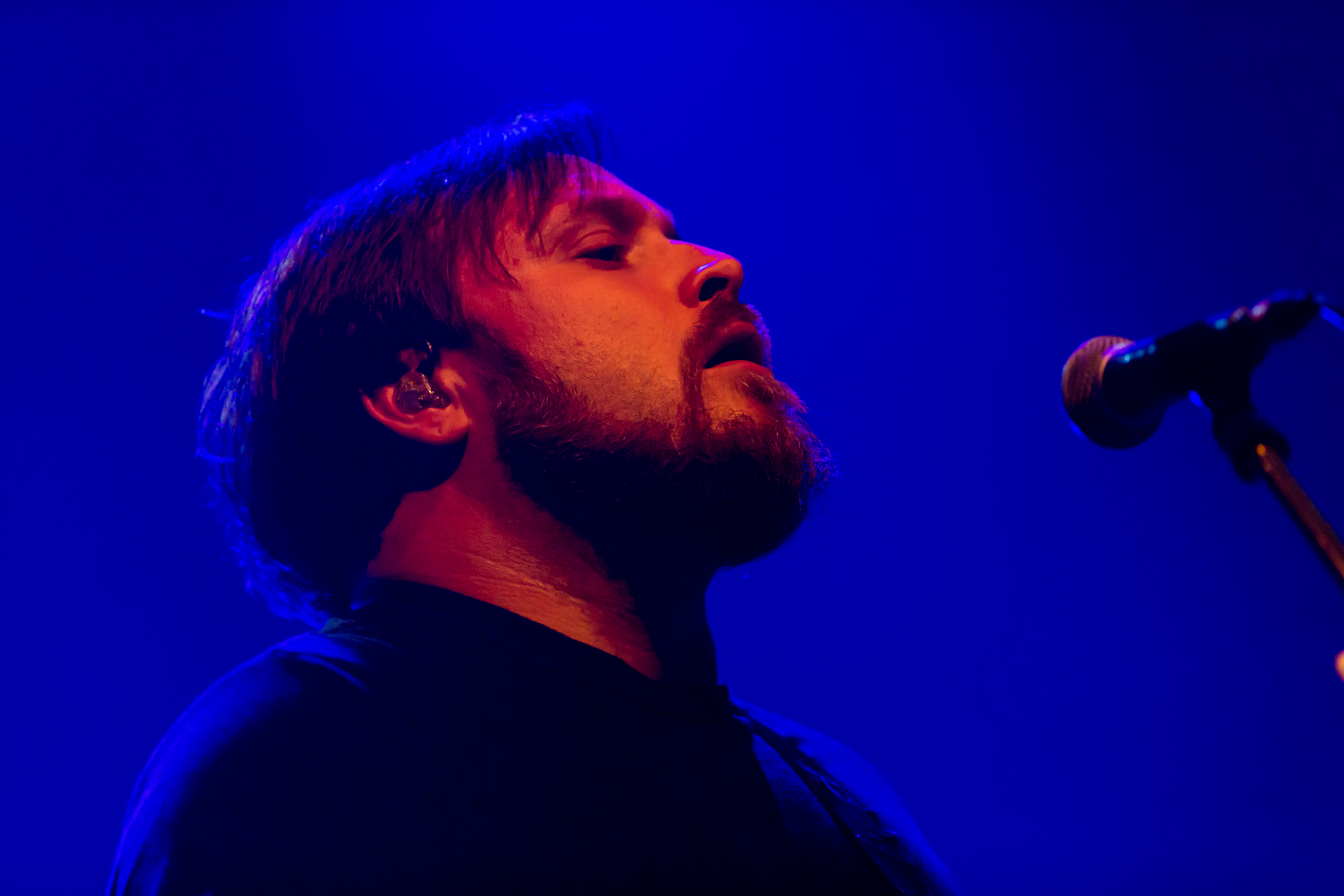
- Stever performing with Coheed and Cambria in 2016

Background information
- Born: November 25, 1978 (age 47) Suffern, New York, U.S.
- Genres: Rock, alternative rock, progressive rock
- Occupation: Musician
- Instruments: Guitar, lap steel, vocals
- Years active: 1995–present
- Labels: Columbia, Sony BMG Music Entertainment
- Member of: Coheed and Cambria; L.S. Dunes
- Website: www.coheedandcambria.com

Travis Stever (born November 25, 1978) is an American musician who is best known as the lead guitarist and co-founder of progressive rock band Coheed and Cambria.

== Coheed and Cambria ==
Travis Stever is a founding member of Coheed and Cambria. The band is named after the title characters in lead singer-guitarist Claudio Sanchez's story, which is central to most of the band's albums. Stever acts as a lead and rhythm guitarist in the band. He wrote the lyrics for the song "Ten Speed". He and Sanchez share leads and solos in the band's music, and often switch back and forth in the "dueling guitar" style made popular in the 1970s.

== Side projects ==
Stever is the lead guitarist and vocalist of a side project called Fire Deuce, a 1980s-style metal band who released "Children of the Deuce" in 2005.

A 2006 side project released an album entitled The English Panther.

Stever has also embarked on a non-Coheed project named Davenport Cabinet, which released Nostalgia In Stereo in 2008, Our Machine in 2013 and Damned Renegades in 2014. In 2021, Stever joined with members of Skarhead and Full Scale Riot to form the alternative rock and metal band Zero Trust, where Stever plays bass guitar. The band formed as an outlet during the COVID-19 pandemic and the 2020–21 United States racial unrest, debuting with a two song, self-titled EP.

Stever is a member of the post-hardcore/alternative rock supergroup L.S. Dunes featuring members of Circa Survive, My Chemical Romance, and Thursday, with their debut album, Past Lives, released on November 11, 2022.

== Instruments ==
Travis' main guitars are usually stock Gibson Les Paul's modified with a Bigsby vibrato tailpiece.

Besides guitar, Stever plays other stringed instruments such as the bass guitar, lap steel, banjo, mandolin, and dobro. He is credited with these instruments on various tracks of Coheed albums, and experiments with many of them on the Davenport Cabinet albums.

He uses a guitar talk box, as seen in The Last Supper: Live at Hammerstein Ballroom and Neverender Box Set.

He contributed to The Prize Fighter Inferno's My Brother's Blood Machine by playing lap steel on "Wayne Andrews, The Old Beekeeper".

== Equipment ==
=== Guitars ===
- All electric guitars strung with DR Strings: DDT-10/52
- Gibson Les Paul Standard in wine red w/ Bigsby B5 Tailpiece, Sperzel locking tuners, and Gibson black speed knobs
- Gibson Les Paul Standard in Vintage Sunburst w/ a Graph-Tech nut and Chrome Grover tuners w/ EMG 81/85
- Gibson Les Paul Standard in Heritage Cherry-Burst, kept stock
- Gibson Les Paul Goldtop Traditional w/ Bigsby B7 Tailpiece
- Gibson Les Paul Custom in Ebony w/ The Keywork graphic built into the finish
- Gibson Les Paul Studio in Alpine White w/ Gold hardware, kept stock (The Running Free video)
- Gibson SG Special in Blue-Teal Flip-Flop w/ Chrome Grover tuners and a Graph-Tech nut tuned B Standard for Sentry the Defiant
- Gibson Johnny A. Model (Domino the Destitute video)
- Taylor 814-CE acoustic/electric
- Rickenbacker lap-steel slide guitar tuned to open F (used only in "Once Upon Your Dead Body" and "The Willing Well II: From Fear Through The Eyes Of Madness")

=== Amplifiers ===
- Bogner Uberschall 120 W Head w/ Standard Grill
- Marshall JCM900 100 W Head
- Mesa/Boogie Stiletto Deuce 100 W Head
- Mesa/Boogie Stiletto Ace 2×12 50 W Combo
- Marshall JCM2000 Head
- Mesa/Boogie Lonestar 2x12 Combo
- Mesa/Boogie Electra Dyne Head
- Mesa/Boogie Mark V Head
- Fractal Audio AxeFX II (current live rig)

=== Cabinets ===
- Mesa/Boogie Rectifier oversized 4x12s
- Bogner Uberschall 4x12s
- Marshall 1960A 4x12

=== Effects ===
- Heil Talk Box
- Dunlop 535Q CryBaby Wah
- Boss DD-3 Digital Delay
- Boss PS-5 Super Shifter
- Boss TU-2 Chromatic Tuner
- Ernie Ball VP Junior Passive Volume Pedal
- Morley Steve Vai Bad Horsie 2 Contour Wah
- Fractal Audio AxeFX II (current live rig)

== Personal life ==
Following his parents' divorce, Stever grew up in both Park Ridge, New Jersey, and Nyack, New York.

He attended Park Ridge High School and played on the football team.

At one point during the late 2010s, Stever was a music teacher at School of Rock Orangeburg.
