= Coheed and Cambria discography =

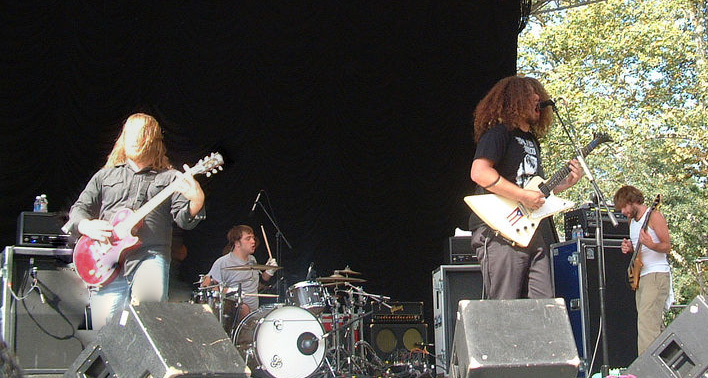
- Coheed and Cambria performing in 2005
- Studio albums: 11
- Extended plays: 4
- Live albums: 5
- Singles: 33
- Video albums: 3
- Music videos: 45

Most of Coheed and Cambria's albums are part of a sci-fi saga called The Amory Wars. They have been released out of sequence in relation to the story arc. The first album released was The Second Stage Turbine Blade, the second part in the series, followed by the third, In Keeping Secrets of Silent Earth: 3, and the fourth, which is split into two volumes. The first, Good Apollo, I'm Burning Star IV, Volume One: From Fear Through the Eyes of Madness, was released in 2005, and the second, entitled Good Apollo, I'm Burning Star IV, Volume Two: No World for Tomorrow, was released on October 23, 2007, and is said to be the last chapter in the ongoing saga of Coheed and Cambria Kilgannon, the main characters in The Amory Wars saga. They released the prequel to the saga, Year of the Black Rainbow, on April 13, 2010. The band then released a double album entitled The Afterman, set before the events of Year of the Black Rainbow. The first part, The Afterman: Ascension, was released October 9, 2012, and the second part, The Afterman: Descension, was released February 5, 2013. The band's eighth album, The Color Before the Sun, was released on October 16, 2015. It is the band's first album not to be part of The Amory Wars concept. After this, the band returned to the Amory Wars storyline with a planned pentalogy of albums, titled Vaxis. The first part, Vaxis – Act I: The Unheavenly Creatures, was released on October 5, 2018. The second part, Vaxis – Act II: A Window of the Waking Mind, was released on June 24, 2022. The third part, Vaxis – Act III: The Father of Make Believe, was released on March 14, 2025.

== Albums ==
=== Studio albums ===
Title	Details	Peak chart positions								Certifications (sales threshold)
Title	Details	US	US Rock	US Indie	AUS	CAN	GER	GRC	UK	Certifications (sales threshold)
The Second Stage Turbine Blade	Release date: March 5, 2002; Label: Equal Vision; Formats: Vinyl, CD	70	12	15	—	—	—	—	—	
In Keeping Secrets of Silent Earth: 3	Release date: October 7, 2003; Label: Equal Vision; Formats: Vinyl, CD	52	—	5	—	—	—	—	—	RIAA: Gold
Good Apollo, I'm Burning Star IV, Volume One: From Fear Through the Eyes of Madness	Release date: September 20, 2005; Label: Columbia; Formats: Vinyl, CD, music download	7	—	—	— (Note: Good Apollo, I'm Burning Star IV, Volume One: From Fear Through the Eyes of Madness did not enter the ARIA Albums Chart, but peaked at number five on the ARIA Hitseekers Albums Chart.)	21	85	—	92	RIAA: Gold
Good Apollo, I'm Burning Star IV, Volume Two: No World for Tomorrow	Release date: October 23, 2007; Label: Columbia; Formats: Vinyl, CD, music download	6	3	—	39	22	—	—	41	
Year of the Black Rainbow	Release date: April 13, 2010; Label: Columbia; Formats: Vinyl, CD, music download	5	2	—	38	14	71	46	35	
The Afterman: Ascension	Release date: October 9, 2012; Label: Hundred Handed/Everything Evil; Formats: Vinyl, CD, music download	5	3	3	—	11	—	—	46	
The Afterman: Descension	Release date: February 5, 2013; Label: Hundred Handed/Everything Evil; Formats: Vinyl, CD, music download	9	3	3	85	16	—	—	64	
The Color Before the Sun	Release date: October 16, 2015; Label: 300 Entertainment; Formats: Vinyl, CD, music download	10	1	—	—	26	—	—	55	
Vaxis – Act I: The Unheavenly Creatures	Release date: October 5, 2018; Label: Roadrunner; Formats: Vinyl, CD, music download	14	3	—	49	58	46	—	36	
Vaxis – Act II: A Window of the Waking Mind	Release date: June 24, 2022; Label: Roadrunner; Formats: Vinyl, CD	23	3	—	—	—	27	—	73	
Vaxis – Act III: The Father of Make Believe	Release date: March 14, 2025; Label: Virgin; Formats: Vinyl, CD	51	7	9	—	—	—	—	70	
"—" denotes releases that did not chart

=== Live albums ===
Title	Details
Live at La Zona Rosa	Release date: June 22, 2004; Label: Columbia/Equal Vision; Bundled with copies of In Keeping Secrets of Silent Earth: 3
Live at the Avalon	Release date: 2005; Label: Columbia; Bundled with copies of Good Apollo, Volume One
Kerrang!/XFM UK Acoustic Sessions	Release date: 2006; Label: Sony BMG Music Entertainment; iTunes exclusive
The Afterman (Live Edition)	Release date: August 13, 2013; Label: Hundred Handed/Everything Evil

=== EPs ===
Year	EP details
1999	Plan to Take Over the World^{[A]}: First EP; Release date: 1999; Label: Wisteria Records
1999	The Penelope EP^{[A]}: Second EP; Release date: 1999; Label: Wisteria Records
2000	Delirium Trigger^{[A]}: Third EP; Release date: 2000; Label: Wisteria Records
2009	Neverender 12%: Fourth EP; Release date: 2009; Label: Columbia Records

Notes

- A. These EPs were released under Coheed and Cambria's original name, Shabűtie.

== Singles ==
Year	Song	Peak chart positions							Certifications	Album
Year	Song	US Bub.	US Alt.	US Hard Rock	US Main.	US Rock	US Rock Airplay	UK	Certifications	Album
2004	"Devil in Jersey City"	—	—	—	—	—	—	—		The Second Stage Turbine Blade
2004	"A Favor House Atlantic"	—	13	—	40	—	—	77	RIAA: Gold	In Keeping Secrets of Silent Earth: 3
2004	"Blood Red Summer"	—	29	—	—	—	—	—		In Keeping Secrets of Silent Earth: 3
2005	"In Keeping Secrets of Silent Earth: 3"	—	—	—	—	—	—	—		In Keeping Secrets of Silent Earth: 3
2005	"Welcome Home"	—	36	—	24	—	—	—	RIAA: Platinum	Good Apollo, I'm Burning Star IV, Volume One: From Fear Through the Eyes of Madness
2006	"The Suffering"	10	16	—	29	—	—	60	RIAA: Gold	Good Apollo, I'm Burning Star IV, Volume One: From Fear Through the Eyes of Madness
2006	"Ten Speed (Of God's Blood and Burial)"	—	—	—	—	—	—	—		Good Apollo, I'm Burning Star IV, Volume One: From Fear Through the Eyes of Madness
2007	"The Running Free"	—	19	—	31	—	—	—		Good Apollo, I'm Burning Star IV, Volume Two: No World for Tomorrow
2008	"Feathers"	—	—	—	—	—	—	—		Good Apollo, I'm Burning Star IV, Volume Two: No World for Tomorrow
2010	"The Broken"	—	—	—	—	— (Note: "The Broken" did not enter the Hot Rock & Alternative Songs chart, but peaked at number 39 on the Rock Digital Song Sales chart.)	—	—		Year of the Black Rainbow
2010	"Here We Are Juggernaut"	—	29	—	—	42	42	—		Year of the Black Rainbow
2010	"World of Lines"	—	—	—	—	—	—	—		Year of the Black Rainbow
2011	"Deranged"	—	—	—	—	—	—	—		Batman: Arkham City – The Album
2012	"Key Entity Extraction I: Domino the Destitute"	—	—	—	—	—	—	—		The Afterman: Ascension
2012	"The Afterman"	—	—	—	—	—	—	—		The Afterman: Ascension
2013	"Dark Side of Me"	—	—	—	—	—	—	—		The Afterman: Descension
2015	"You Got Spirit, Kid"	—	—	—	—	—	—	—		The Color Before the Sun
2015	"Here to Mars"	—	—	—	—	—	—	—		The Color Before the Sun
2018	"The Dark Sentencer"	—	—	—	—	34	—	—		Vaxis – Act I: The Unheavenly Creatures
2018	"Unheavenly Creatures"	—	—	—	—	—	—	—		Vaxis – Act I: The Unheavenly Creatures
2018	"The Gutter"	—	—	—	38	—	—	—		Vaxis – Act I: The Unheavenly Creatures
2018	"Old Flames"	—	—	—	—	—	—	—		Vaxis – Act I: The Unheavenly Creatures
2018	"Love Protocol"	—	—	—	—	—	—	—		Vaxis – Act I: The Unheavenly Creatures
2020	"Jessie's Girl 2" (featuring Rick Springfield)	—	—	12	—	— (Note: "Jessie's Girl 2" did not enter the Hot Rock & Alternative Songs chart, but peaked at number 18 on the Rock Digital Song Sales chart.)	—	—		Non-album single
2021	"Shoulders"	—	—	20	9	—	25	—		Vaxis – Act II: A Window of the Waking Mind
2021	"Rise, Naianasha (Cut the Cord)"	—	—	—	—	—	—	—		Vaxis – Act II: A Window of the Waking Mind
2022	"The Liars Club"	—	—	25	21	—	—	—		Vaxis – Act II: A Window of the Waking Mind
2022	"Comatose"	—	—	—	—	—	—	—		Vaxis – Act II: A Window of the Waking Mind
2024	"The Joke" / "Deranged" (2024 mix)	—	—	23	—	—	—	—		Non-album single
2024	"Blind Side Sonny"	—	—	—	—	—	—	—		Vaxis – Act III: The Father of Make Believe
2024	"Searching for Tomorrow"	—	—	22	—	—	—	—		Vaxis – Act III: The Father of Make Believe
2025	"Someone Who Can"	—	20	—	—	—	41	—		Vaxis – Act III: The Father of Make Believe
2025	"Goodbye, Sunshine" (Endless Summer featuring Nick Hexum)	—	—	—	—	—	—	—		Non-album single
2025	"Key Entity Extraction VII: Yuko the Trivial"	—	—	—	—	—	—	—		Vaxis – Act III: The Father of Make Believe (New Entities Edition)
"—" denotes releases that did not chart

== Other charted songs ==
Year	Song	Peak chart positions	Album
Year	Song	US Hard Rock	Album
2025	"Goodbye, Sunshine"	16	Vaxis – Act III: The Father of Make Believe
2025	"The Father of Make Believe"	23	Vaxis – Act III: The Father of Make Believe

== Other appearances ==
Year	Song	Album
2008	"The Trooper" (Iron Maiden cover)	Maiden Heaven: A Tribute to Iron Maiden
2011	"Deranged"	Batman: Arkham City – The Album
2011	"Beer Drinkers & Hell Raisers" (ZZ Top cover)	ZZ Top: A Tribute from Friends
2015	"Hello" (Adele cover)	Non-album single

== Guest appearances ==
Year	Song	Artist	Album
2025	"counting on you"	LSR/CITY	CYBERPUNK (Original Motion Concert Soundtrack)

== Soundtrack appearances ==
=== Films ===
Year	Song	Soundtrack
2006	"Wake Up" (acoustic)	Snakes on a Plane
2009	"Welcome Home"	9

=== Video games ===
Year	Song	Soundtrack
2004	"A Favor House Atlantic"	ATV Offroad Fury 3
2005	"Welcome Home"	Madden NFL 06
2007	"Welcome Home"	Rock Band
2008	"Ten Speed (Of God's Blood & Burial)"	Rock Band
2008	"The Running Free"	NHL 09
2009	"A Favor House Atlantic"	Major League Baseball 2K9
2010	"Guns of Summer"	Rock Band 2
2010	"Here We Are Juggernaut"	Rock Band 2
2010	"The Broken"	Rock Band 2
2010	"World of Lines"	Tony Hawk: Shred
2018	"Unheavenly Creatures"	Rock Band 4
2022	"The Liars Club"	Rock Band 4
2022	"Welcome Home"	Rock Band 4
2022	"The Liars Club"	NHL 23
2025	"Welcome Home"	Fortnite Festival
2026	"Searching for Tomorrow"	Forza Horizon 6

== Videos ==
=== Video albums ===
Year	Album details	Certifications
2005	Live at the Starland Ballroom: Released: March 22, 2005; Label: Columbia Records	RIAA: Gold
2006	The Last Supper: Live at Hammerstein Ballroom: Released: October 31, 2006; Label: Equal Vision	
2009	Neverender: Children of The Fence Edition: Released: March 24, 2009; Label: Sony BMG	RIAA: Gold

=== Music videos ===
Year	Song	Director
2003	"Delirium Trigger"	Coheed and Cambria
2003	"Devil in Jersey City"	Christian Winters
2003	"Devil in Jersey City" (alternate video)	Coheed and Cambria
2004	"A Favor House Atlantic"	Christian Winters
2004	"Blood Red Summer"	Marc Webb
2005	"The Suffering"	Artificial Army
2005	"Welcome Home"	Artificial Army
2006	"Ten Speed (Of God's Blood & Burial)"	Brian Lazzaro
2006	"The Willing Well IV: The Final Cut"	Claudio Sanchez
2007	"The Running Free"	Nathan "Karma" Cox
2008	"Feathers"	Marc Klasfeld
2008	"Gravemakers & Gunslingers"	Claudio Sanchez
2010	"The Broken"	Weweremonkeys
2010	"Here We Are Juggernaut"	Josh Forbes
2010	"World of Lines"	Lex Halaby
2011	"Far"	Aaron Hymes
2012	"Key Entity Extraction I: Domino the Destitute"	Robert "Roboshobo" Schober
2012	"The Afterman"	Robert "Roboshobo" Schober
2013	"Dark Side of Me"	Robert "Roboshobo" Schober
2013	"Number City"	Jonathan "Dropbear" Chong
2015	"You Got Spirit, Kid"	DJay Brawner
2015	"Island" (alternate video)	Coheed and Cambria
2016	"Island"	Anderson Wright
2016	"Bridge and Tunnel" (demo)	Nicholas Hipa
2016	"Colors"	Ernie Falconer
2018	"Unheavenly Creatures"	P. R. Brown
2018	"Old Flames"	Charles Todd
2019	"True Ugly"	Claudio Sanchez and Ernie "Dirty Ern" Falconer
2019	"The Pavilion (A Long Way Back)"	Claudio Sanchez and Ernie "Dirty Ern" Falconer
2019	"Toys"	Alex Wasilewski
2020	"Jessie's Girl 2" (featuring Rick Springfield)	Craig Bernard and Culley Bunker
2021	"Shoulders"	Max Moore
2022	"The Liars Club"	Marco Pavone
2022	"The Liars Club" (performance video)	Ernie Falconer
2022	"Love Gun" (Kiss cover)	Ernie Falconer
2022	"A Disappearing Act"	Max Moore
2023	"Beautiful Losers"	Patrik Skoglöw
2023	"Ladders of Supremacy"	Darin "Pix3lface" Vartanian
2023	"Devil in Jersey City" (Live at the Starland Ballroom)	Coheed and Cambria
2024	"The Joke"	Max Moore
2024	"Blind Side Sonny"	Max Moore
2024	"Searching for Tomorrow"	A.F. Schepperd
2025	"Someone Who Can"	Mason Mercer
2025	"Goodbye, Sunshine" (Endless Summer featuring Nick Hexum)	Josh Forbes
2025	"Goodbye, Sunshine"	Josh Forbes
2025	"One Last Miracle"	Alex Wasilewski
