= The Afterman =

The Afterman refers to a double album by Coheed and Cambria:

- The Afterman: Ascension, 2012 album
- The Afterman: Descension, 2013 album
- The Afterman (Live Edition), 2013 live album
