= Vaxis =

Vaxis may refer to:

- Vaxis – Act I: The Unheavenly Creatures, 2018 album by Coheed and Cambria
- Vaxis – Act II: A Window of the Waking Mind, 2022 album by Coheed and Cambria
- Vaxis – Act III: The Father of Make Believe, 2025 album by Coheed and Cambria
