= Vaxis – Act III: The Father of Make Believe =

Studio album by Coheed and Cambria
- Released: March 14, 2025
- Recorded: 2024
- Genre: Progressive rock; hard rock; alternative rock
- Length: 57:27
- Label: Virgin
- Producer: Claudio Sanchez; Zakk Cervini

Coheed and Cambria chronology
Vaxis – Act II: A Window of the Waking Mind (2022)	Vaxis – Act III: The Father of Make Believe (2025)

Singles from Vaxis – Act III: The Father of Make Believe
- 1. "Blind Side Sonny" Released: October 2, 2024; 2. "Searching for Tomorrow" Released: November 20, 2024; 3. "Someone Who Can" Released: January 14, 2025; 4. "Goodbye, Sunshine" Released: August 20, 2025; 5. "Key Entity Extraction VII: Yuko the Trivial" Released: September 10, 2025

Vaxis – Act III: The Father of Make Believe is the eleventh studio album by American progressive rock band Coheed and Cambria. It was released on March 14, 2025. The album, like most of the studio albums from the band, is a concept album that continues the Amory Wars storyline. A deluxe edition of the album, called the New Entities Edition, was released on October 3, 2025.

== Themes and composition ==
While the album continues The Amory Wars storyline established in most of the band's previous albums, frontman and lead writer Claudio Sanchez has stated that this album was more personal than others, with a focus on personal stories rather than the concept first. Sanchez has described the album as a "midlife crisis."

The album's themes revolve around loss, as "Yesterday's Lost" sees Sanchez ponder a potential time without his wife and "Meri of Mercy" features the return of characters inspired by his late grandparents.

== Critical reception ==
Professional ratings
Aggregate scores
Source	Rating
Metacritic	82/100
Review scores
Source	Rating
3 Songs & Out	4.5/5 stars
Kerrang!	4/5
Maximum Volume Music	9.5/10
Metal Hammer	4/5 stars
New Noise Magazine	5/5 stars
PopMatters	7/10
Sputnikmusic	4.7/5

Vaxis – Act III: The Father of Make Believe was released to critical acclaim from many contemporary music critics. At Metacritic, which assigns a normalized rating out of 100 to reviews from mainstream critics, the album received an average score of 82 based on five reviews, indicating "universal acclaim".

== Track listing ==
All tracks are written by Claudio Sanchez except "Corner My Confidence" written by Sanchez and Zakk Cervini.

Vaxis – Act III: The Father of Make Believe
No.	Title	Length
1.	"Yesterday's Lost"	3:24
2.	"Goodbye, Sunshine"	4:16
3.	"Searching for Tomorrow"	3:33
4.	"The Father of Make Believe"	4:39
5.	"Meri of Mercy"	4:16
6.	"Blind Side Sonny"	2:22
7.	"Play the Poet"	3:29
8.	"One Last Miracle"	3:12
9.	"Corner My Confidence"	4:04
10.	"Someone Who Can"	3:45
11.	"The Continuum I: Welcome to Forever, Mr. Nobody"	3:43
12.	"The Continuum II: The Flood"	6:23
13.	"The Continuum III: Tethered Together"	4:36
14.	"The Continuum IV: So It Goes"	5:45
Total length:		57:27

Vinyl edition-exclusive bonus track
No.	Title	Length
15.	"The Omni-Voice"	23:24
Total length:		80:51

New Entities Edition
No.	Title	Length
15.	"Key Entity Extraction VI: Melvin the Mistake"	3:50
16.	"Key Entity Extraction VII: Yuko the Trivial"	3:52
17.	"Key Entity Extraction VIII: Peter the Wishing"	6:28
18.	"Key Entity Extraction IX: Shiloh the Selfish"	3:56
Total length:		75:06

Notes

- "Yesterday's Lost" contains, at approximately 0:28, a reprise of "The Hollow" from The Afterman: Ascension.
- "The Continuum III: Tethered Together" contains multiple allusions to the Key Entity Extraction suite from the Afterman albums, most prominently reprising the melody of "Key Entity Extraction I: Domino the Destitute" from The Afterman: Ascension. It also contains the choral chant from “The End Complete III: The End Complete” from Good Apollo, I'm Burning Star IV, Volume Two: No World for Tomorrow.
- "The Continuum IV: So It Goes" contains, at approximately 5:16, a reprise of "Pretelethal" from The Afterman: Descension.

== Personnel ==
=== Coheed and Cambria ===
- Claudio Sanchez – vocals, guitar, synthesizer, production
- Travis Stever – guitar
- Zach Cooper – bass
- Josh Eppard – drums

=== Additional musicians ===
- Christopher Jahnke – orchestrations

=== Technical ===
- Zakk Cervini – production, mixing, engineering
- Chris Athens – mastering
- Julian Garguilo – mix assistant, engineering, additional production
- Sean-Paul Pillsworth – drums engineering

=== Artwork ===
- Chase Stone – art
- Nick Steinhardt – design

== Charts ==
Chart performance for Vaxis – Act III: The Father of Make Believe
Chart (2025)	Peak position
Scottish Albums (OCC)	11
UK Albums (OCC)	70
UK Independent Albums (OCC)	4
UK Rock & Metal Albums (OCC)	3
US Billboard 200	51
US Independent Albums (Billboard)	9
US Top Rock & Alternative Albums (Billboard)	8
