= Evil Ink Comics =

American comic book publishing company

Evil Ink Comics is a comic publishing company set up by Claudio Sanchez, the lead singer of progressive rock band Coheed and Cambria. Currently Evil Ink is co-publisher to three graphic series; The Amory Wars, Kill Audio and Key of Z. In 2009, Evil Ink released its first prose novel, Year of the Black Rainbow. Each part of The Amory Wars series features the same title as its respective Coheed and Cambria album, as each album tells different parts of the said story.

== History ==
=== The Second Stage Turbine Blade ===
In the Summer of 2004, the company released two parts of their first comic, The Second Stage Turbine Blade, two years after the release of the album of the same name, as part of the Bag On Line Adventures, which would later be renamed The Amory Wars. These comics would tell approximately the first third of the album. The illustrator was Wes Abbott, but as he is currently on hiatus, the first issue is out of print and the second is becoming rare. Due to lack of funding, no further comics could be made to continue the series until 2005.

Claudio Sanchez have announced in interviews that a novelisation of the story is currently being written by him and Peter David, the same two that have written the Year of The Black Rainbow novel.

=== The Amory Wars Sketchbook ===
Claudio Sanchez, after the widespread success of Coheed and Cambria, managed to fund the Bag On Line series, renaming it “The Amory Wars”. Sanchez decided that, as the original comics were going out of print, and that due to lack of funds, they did not contain everything he wanted, the series would be started from scratch. Until the project took off, Sanchez and a new illustrator, Gus Vasquez, released The Amory Wars Sketchbook (originally dubbed "Comic Zero"), explaining the very beginning of The Amory Wars story. The book was released at Comic-Con, and later made available from their website August 18, 2006.

=== Good Apollo, I'm Burning Star IV, Volume One: From Fear Through the Eyes of Madness ===
Although chronologically missing out the album In Keeping Secrets of Silent Earth: 3, Evil Ink Comics went on to release the ‘’Good Apollo…’’ graphic novel, illustrated by Christopher Shy. Although Sanchez had stated that the Amory Wars series would be started from the beginning, the comic was released to coincide with the album of the same name. The graphic novel is considered the “twist” part of the story. Claudio, in a 2006 interview, stated that a lot was lost from the graphic novel because of financial constraints. He further explained that although Christopher Shy's art is beautiful, it was not the best medium for Good Apollo's story-telling. Claudio looks forward to releasing a new version in chronological order so that the story will make more sense.

=== The Amory Wars ===
In June 2007, the first part (of five) of the Second Stage Turbine Blade comic was finally re-released, illustrated by Gus Vasquez, as the beginning of The Amory Wars series. It was published by Evil Ink Comics along with the help of Image Comics and 12 Gauge Comics, and covers will be drawn by Tony Moore of The Walking Dead fame. The second issue of The Second Stage Turbine Blade was released July 2007, and the third in August 2007. The fourth issue was released in November 2007, and the fifth and last issue of the first volume of The Second Stage Turbine Blade was released in January 2008. The second part of The Second Stage Turbine Blade is a five-part monthly series that started in June 2008.

=== Kill Audio ===
In 2009, Evil Ink and Boom!Studios released Kill Audio, a six-part series co-written with Claudio Sanchez and Chondra Echert and illustrated by Sheldon Vella. A small portion of the series appeared originally in Image Comics' PopGun2 and follows a troll through a psychedelic landscape on his journey to explain his immortality.

=== Key Of Z ===
In October 2011, Evil Ink and Boom!Studios released the first issue of the four part miniseries Key Of Z, the second series to be co-written by Claudio Sanchez and Chondra Echert. Key Of Z tells the story of a man trying to survive a zombie apocalypse in New York City, while avenging the deaths of his wife and son at the hands of warring factions of survivors. In February 2012, the series was released as a trade paperback.

== See also ==
- Coheed and Cambria
- The Amory Wars
- Claudio Sanchez
