= The Color Before the Sun =

Studio album by Coheed and Cambria
- Released: October 16, 2015
- Genre: Alternative rock; pop-punk; pop rock
- Length: 47:07
- Label: 300 Entertainment
- Producer: Jay Joyce; Coheed and Cambria

Coheed and Cambria chronology
The Afterman (Live Edition) (2013)	The Color Before the Sun (2015)	Vaxis – Act I: The Unheavenly Creatures (2018)

Singles from The Color Before the Sun
- 1. "You Got Spirit, Kid" Released: July 10, 2015; 2. "Here to Mars" Released: September 3, 2015

The Color Before the Sun is the eighth studio album by American progressive rock band Coheed and Cambria. Following the conceptual double album, The Afterman: Ascension and Descension, released in 2012 and 2013 respectively, The Color Before the Sun is the first non-conceptual album the band has released, making it the only Coheed and Cambria album not to be a part of The Amory Wars storyline. The band released a live acoustic version of "Atlas" in August 2014, and announced a release date of October 9 in July of the following year, before announcing a push back to October 16, 2015. The first single was "You Got Spirit, Kid", released in July 2015, with a music video for the song released in August. A second music video, for the song "Island", was released in October.

== Background and recording ==
In August 2014, Coheed and Cambria singer and guitarist Claudio Sanchez released a self-shot acoustic rendition of a new song titled "Atlas" via the band's official YouTube channel.

== Musical style ==
Journalists characterized the album's sound in a number of ways. AllMusic, in describing the album's songs, stated that “some are fueled by catchy hard rock/pop-punk hooks with anthemic choruses, while others offer knotty, dissonant angles and breathtaking instrumental interplay.” Pop Matters noted similarities with the band's prior work, stating that "Even without a conceptual story, The Color Before the Sun feature[s] a lot of the same musical elements that have made the long-running prog-rock band so enduring: big riffs, bigger choruses, intricate guitar interplay, and strong vocals from frontman-songwriter-guitarist Claudio Sanchez". According to Darryl Sterdan of Toronto Sun, "The Color Before the Sun" abandons the band's previous progressive rock sound, in favor of a "more grounded and streamlined" alternative rock sound. Richard Whittaker at The Austin Chronicle characterized the album as "pop rock rather than space prog."

== Release ==
The album was released in both digital and physical formats on October 16, 2015. The album name and release date were announced on July 7, 2015, via social media and the release of a new single, "You Got Spirit, Kid", available to stream. A second single, "Here to Mars" was released on September 3, 2015. On August 6, 2015, a limited edition, deluxe box set was announced. This deluxe box set includes two CDs—the album and a disc of demo tracks—two hardcover books—one featuring album lyrics and artwork and another featuring a "behind-the-scenes look" of the album's creative process—an in-studio DVD, and a clear 7-inch record of unreleased demo tracks. Purchasers also received an instant download of “You Got Spirit, Kid,” a membership card, a custom house key, a lapel pin, a certificate of authenticity; as well as exclusive, members-only access to new music, videos, concert tickets, merchandise and commentary from the band. The week of the release, the band streamed the entire album on the Pandora radio site.

== Reception ==
Professional ratings
Aggregate scores
Source	Rating
Metacritic	70/100
Review scores
Source	Rating
AllMusic	3.5/5 stars
Alternative Press	4/5 stars
The Austin Chronicle	3/5 stars
Classic Rock Magazine	3.5/5 stars
Consequence of Sound	C+
Kerrang!	3/5
PopMatters	7/10 stars

At Metacritic, The Color Before the Sun generated a score of 70/100 from nine reviews, indicating "Generally favorable reviews".

Tom Jurek at AllMusic stated "The Color Before the Sun is not the band's best record, but it is utterly inspired and almost nakedly sincere. It will likely play well to fans, but even more importantly, perhaps attract new ones." Sean Barry of Consequence of Sound opined "this sort of autobiographical songwriting can’t be found in the band’s foundation." Despite that, Barry stated that "this new freedom and genuine self-acceptance" should be encouraged by the band and expanded upon in future material. Jordan Blum from PopMatters concluded that it's a good album in its own right, and that fans will find things to enjoy about the album, adding "It may sound silly to fault an album for not doing what it was never meant to do, but the lack of an epic scope and a more seamless sequence ... surely makes The Color Before the Sun feel less significant and magnificent than many of its predecessors."

The album was included at number 29 on Rock Sound's top 50 releases of 2015 list.

== Track listing ==
All songs written by Claudio Sanchez. All songs arranged by Coheed and Cambria, all segues arranged by Sanchez.

The Color Before the Sun
No.	Title	Length
1.	"Island"	5:01
2.	"Eraser"	3:52
3.	"Colors"	4:41
4.	"Here to Mars"	4:01
5.	"Ghost"	2:45
6.	"Atlas"	6:03
7.	"Young Love"	3:50
8.	"You Got Spirit, Kid"	4:11
9.	"The Audience"	6:10
10.	"Peace to the Mountain"	6:33
Total length:		47:07

Best Buy exclusive bonus tracks
No.	Title	Length
11.	"Bridge and Tunnel" (demo)	4:36
12.	"Eraser" (demo)	3:42

Deconstructed Deluxe Edition
No.	Title	Length
11.	"Island" (Big Beige / 4th Street Demo)	4:28
12.	"Eraser" (Big Beige / 4th Street Demo)	3:41
13.	"Colors" (Big Beige / 4th Street Demo)	4:24
14.	"Here to Mars" (Big Beige / 4th Street Demo)	4:23
15.	"Ghost" (Big Beige / 4th Street Demo)	2:30
16.	"Atlas" (Big Beige / 4th Street Demo)	6:53
17.	"Young Love" (Big Beige / 4th Street Demo)	3:36
18.	"You Got Spirit, Kid" (Big Beige / 4th Street Demo)	3:16
19.	"The Audience" (Big Beige / 4th Street Demo)	6:01
20.	"Peace to the Mountain" (Big Beige / 4th Street Demo)	5:42
21.	"Bridge and Tunnel" (Big Beige / 4th Street Demo)	4:36
22.	"Fangs of the Fox" (Big Beige / 4th Street Demo)	6:19
23.	"Island" (Live Soundboard Bootleg: Jannus Live, St. Petersburg, FL 03/12/16)	4:44
24.	"In Keeping Secrets of Silent Earth: 3" (Live Soundboard Bootleg: Revention Center, Houston, TX 03/17/16)	10:03
25.	"Blood Red Summer" (Live Soundboard Bootleg: Tabernacle, Atlanta, GA 03/14/16)	4:28
26.	"Devil in Jersey City" (Live Soundboard Bootleg: Marquee Theatre, Tempe, AZ 03/21/16)	4:59
27.	"Everything Evil" (Live Soundboard Bootleg: Jannus Live, St. Petersburg, FL 03/12/16)	6:12
28.	"Key Entity Extraction V: Sentry the Defiant" (Live Soundboard Bootleg: Marquee Theatre, Tempe, AZ 03/21/16)	5:11
29.	"Here to Mars" (Live Soundboard Bootleg: Jannus Live, St. Petersburg, FL 03/12/16)	4:11
30.	"The Audience" (Live Soundboard Bootleg: Revention Center, Houston, TX 03/17/16)	6:07

== Personnel ==
=== Coheed and Cambria ===
- Claudio Sanchez – lead vocals, rhythm guitar
- Travis Stever – lead guitar, backing vocals
- Josh Eppard – drums, percussion, backing vocals
- Zach Cooper – bass, backing vocals

=== Additional instrumentation ===
- Roy Agee – horns
- Mike Haynes – horns
- Jennifer Kummer – horns
- Avery Bright – strings
- Melodie Morris – strings
- Eleonore Denig – strings
- Jay Joyce – Rhodes piano
- Chondra Marie Sanchez – additional background vocals
- The Prize Fighter Inferno – synth world

=== Artwork ===
- Nick Steinhardt – cover art

== Charts ==
Chart (2015)	Peak position
UK Albums (Official Charts)	55
Canadian Albums (Billboard)	26
US Billboard 200	10
US Top Rock Albums (Billboard)	1
