= Good Apollo =

Good Apollo may refer to one of two albums by the American rock band Coheed and Cambria:

- Good Apollo, I'm Burning Star IV, Volume One: From Fear Through the Eyes of Madness, released in 2005
- Good Apollo, I'm Burning Star IV, Volume Two: No World for Tomorrow, released in 2007
