= SSTB =

SSTB could refer to the following:

- The Second Stage Turbine Blade, a studio album by rock band Coheed and Cambria.
- Sita Sings the Blues, a 2008 animated feature film by American artist Nina Paley.
