= Running Free (disambiguation) =

"Running Free" is a song by Iron Maiden.

Running Free may also refer to:

- Running Free (album), an album by Dragon
- Running Free, an album by Stillwater
- Running Free (film), a 2000 film about a horse during the Great War
- "The Running Free", a song by Coheed and Cambria
