= Here We Are Juggernaut =

Single by Coheed and Cambria

from the album Year of the Black Rainbow
- Released: March 9, 2010
- Recorded: 2009
- Genre: Progressive rock
- Length: 3:44
- Label: Columbia, Equal Vision
- Songwriter: Claudio Sanchez
- Producers: Atticus Ross, Joe Barresi

Coheed and Cambria singles chronology
"Feathers" (2008)	"Here We Are Juggernaut" (2010)	"World of Lines" (2010)

"Here We Are Juggernaut" is the first single from the Coheed and Cambria album Year of the Black Rainbow. The song was released for streaming on the band's Myspace on March 4, 2010. It was made available for purchase on March 9, 2010. It was made available as downloadable content for the music video game series Rock Band on April 20, 2010. On July 27, 2010, Coheed and Cambria released a remix of the song digitally remixed by co-producer Atticus Ross.

== Music video ==
The music video for the single was released on May 3, 2010 on Vevo. The music video features the band playing the song on a rooftop with cuts to people witnessing a celestial phenomenon. The video concludes with a young man and woman gazing towards the phenomenon, a view of the Keywork. The Keywork refers to a fictional force that holds together the planets of "Heaven's Fence," the setting of the band's "Amory Wars" sci-fi concept.

== Track listing ==
Promo single

No.	Title	Length
1.	"Here We Are Juggernaut"	3:44

Remix single

No.	Title	Length
1.	"Here We Are Juggernaut" (Atticus Ross Covent Marth Remix)	6:29

== Chart positions ==
Chart (2010)	Peak position
US Alternative Songs	29
US Rock Songs	42
