= You Got Spirit, Kid =

Single by Coheed and Cambria

from the album The Color Before the Sun
- Released: July 10, 2015
- Recorded: 2015
- Genre: Pop punk, power pop
- Length: 4:11
- Label: 300 Entertainment
- Songwriter(s): Claudio Sanchez
- Producer(s): Jay Joyce, Coheed and Cambria

Coheed and Cambria singles chronology
"Dark Side of Me" (2013)	"You Got Spirit, Kid" (2015)	"Here to Mars" (2015)

"You Got Spirit, Kid" is a song by American progressive rock band Coheed and Cambria, released from their eighth studio album The Color Before the Sun on July 10, 2015.

== Composition ==
"You Got Spirit, Kid" harkens back to the material found on In Keeping Secrets of Silent Earth: 3 and contains a more pop-oriented sound, being described as pop punk and power pop. The concept for the song is trying to accept things the way they are and making the best out of them.

== Reception ==
Murjani Rawls of Mind Equals Blown described the song as "particularly upbeat, even going into a pop realm." Rawls discussed how it reflects on how young people feel these days, adding ""You Got Spirit, Kid" brings back a little bit of older Coheed with a new concept that it’s entirely personal."

== Music video ==
A music video for "You Got Spirit, Kid" was released on July 10, 2015. The video was directed by DJay Brawner and produced by Ray Blanco. It features the band performing various antics at a high school.

Regarding the video, vocalist Claudio Sanchez stated "Our video for "You Got Spirit, Kid" gave us a chance to showcase a relaxed side of the band’s personality. With our love for '80s Nostalgia, we decided to approach the treatment in a John Hughes or Steven Spielberg type fashion, allowing the spirit of youth and camaraderie to shine in each frame." Timothy Gabriele at PopMatters was critical of the video, stating "it's creepy that these old musicians pretending to be guys too old for high school are making music specifically aimed at teenagers, baiting them with foul-mouthed takes on riffs that seem to lift straight from the Warrant handbook."
