= The Afterman: Descension =

Studio album by Coheed and Cambria
- Released: February 5, 2013
- Recorded: November 2011 – June 2012 Applehead Recording Woodstock, NY
- Genre: Progressive metal; progressive rock; alternative rock
- Length: 43:24
- Label: Hundred Handed/Everything Evil
- Producer: Coheed and Cambria; Michael Birnbaum; Chris Bittner

Coheed and Cambria chronology
The Afterman: Ascension (2012)	The Afterman: Descension (2013)	The Afterman (Live Edition) (2013)

Singles from The Afterman: Descension
- 1. "Dark Side of Me" Released: January 14, 2013

The Afterman: Descension is the seventh studio album by American progressive rock band Coheed and Cambria. It is the second part of a double album, the first part of which is The Afterman: Ascension. The band took seven months to record the albums between 2011 and 2012, and announced a February 5, 2013 release date.

The deluxe version of the album was released with a coffee-table book co-written by band member Claudio Sanchez and writer Peter David, giving a song-by-song experience of the concept album. The album is a prequel to the Amory Wars storyline, and concentrates on the character Sirius Amory.

== Background and recording ==
Coheed and Cambria began recording the double album in November 2011, and had finished recording by June 2012.

"Iron Fist" was debuted in 2010. The song was also featured in the acoustic set during their "Neverender: Second Stage Turbine Blade" dates in 2011.

In February, 2012, Coheed and Cambria singer/guitarist Claudio Sanchez released a self-shot acoustic rendition of a new song titled "Sentry the Defiant" (later retitled "Key Entity Extraction V: Sentry The Defiant") via the band's official YouTube channel.

== Release ==
The album was released in both digital and physical formats on February 5, 2013; the first part (The Afterman: Ascension) was released on 9 October 2012. The album name and release date were announced on July 31, 2012 via a press release and a YouTube teaser video, featuring a man in a spaceship speaking to an AI he refers to as "All Mother". Coheed and Cambria co-produced the album with Michael Birnbaum and Chris Bittner under the label Hundred Handed/Everything Evil and will be distributed by Fontana/INgrooves.

The deluxe version of the album was released with a hardcover coffee-table book of the album's Amory Wars storyline, the concept all Coheed and Cambria's albums follow (with the exception of 2015's The Color Before the Sun). The book is co-written by Sanchez and writer Peter David, who worked together on the book which accompanied Coheed and Cambria's previous album, Year of the Black Rainbow. The double album tells the story of Sirius Amory, the namesake of the concept, as he explores the energy source holding together the Keywork (the 78 worlds in which the Amory Wars is set) and finds that it is in fact a horrible afterlife for departed souls. The artwork for the book was created by Heidi Taillefer and Nathan Spoor, and the book provides a "song-by-song" experience for the listener.

The song "The Hard Sell" was released on December 18, 2012 as part of Guitar Center's Fresh Cuts Vol. 8 compilation CD. A lyric video of the song was later put on the band's official YouTube channel. "Dark Side of Me" was later released on January 14, 2013, along with a lyric video, on the band's Facebook page. The band also played the song on the January 21 episode of Conan. Similarly, "Number City" was released exclusively on NME.com on January 30, 2013, and "Iron Fist" was released on the official Coheed and Cambria Tumblr Account the following day.

== Reception ==
Professional ratings
Aggregate scores
Source	Rating
Metacritic	75/100
Review scores
Source	Rating
Allmusic	4/5 stars
Alternative Press	4/5 stars
Classic Rock	4/5 stars
Consequence of Sound	3.4/5 stars
Kerrang!	4/5 stars
musicOMH	4/5 stars
PopMatters	7/10 stars
Punknews.org	3.5/5 stars
Sputnikmusic	4/5

=== Critical ===
The album was met with generally positive reviews. It has received 4/5 ratings from Allmusic, Alternative Press, Kerrang! and musicOMH. The overall rating on Metacritic is 75/100.

=== Commercial ===
The Afterman: Descension debuted at No. 9 on the Billboard 200 albums chart on its release, selling around 41,000 copies in the United States in its first week. It also debuted at No. 3 on both the Billboard's Top Rock Albums and Alternative Albums charts. The album has sold 91,600 copies in the United States as of October 2015.

The album debuted at number 64 on the UK Albums Chart and number 3 on the UK Rock Albums Chart.

== Track listing ==
All tracks are written by Claudio Sanchez, except "Away We Go", "Iron Fist" and "Dark Side of Me" composed by Claudio Sanchez and Travis Stever

The Afterman: Descension
No.	Title	Length
1.	"Pretelethal"	3:21
2.	"Key Entity Extraction V: Sentry the Defiant"	5:45
3.	"The Hard Sell"	5:10
4.	"Number City"	3:49
5.	"Gravity's Union"	6:46
6.	"Away We Go"	3:55
7.	"Iron Fist"	4:46
8.	"Dark Side of Me"	5:03
9.	"2's My Favorite 1"	4:55
Total length:		43:24

iTunes Deluxe edition bonus tracks
No.	Title	Length
10.	"Dark Side of Me" (Einziger and Sanchez remix)	4:24
11.	"Carol Ann" (bonus track)	5:06
12.	"Random Reality Shifts" (bonus track)	5:47
Total length:		15:15

Limited Deluxe Edition Box Set: Disc 4 (Big Beige demos)
No.	Title	Length
1.	"Sentry the Defiant" (demo)	4:56
2.	"The Hard Sell" (demo three)	4:39
3.	"Gravity's Union" (demo)	5:54
4.	"Away We Go" (demo)	4:07
5.	"Iron Fist" (Bunny Man Bridge demo)	4:38
6.	"Iron Fist" (Acoustic Stripped demo)	4:36
7.	"2's My Favorite 1" (demo)	3:21
8.	"2's My Favorite 1" (Piano demo)	3:25
9.	"Carol Ann" (bonus track)	5:06
10.	"Random Reality Shifts" (bonus track)	5:47
11.	"Dark Side of Me" (Einziger and Sanchez remix)	4:25
Total length:		50:52

== Personnel ==
=== Coheed and Cambria ===
- Claudio Sanchez – lead vocals, guitars, electric piano, ukulele, voice of Sirius Amory
- Travis Stever – guitars, lap steel guitar, backing vocals
- Josh Eppard – drums, percussion, keyboards, backing vocals
- Zach Cooper – bass, backing vocals

=== Additional musicians ===
- John Medeski – piano, clavinet, synthesizers
- Daniel Sedownick – additional percussion
- Steve Bernstein – horns
- Stan Harisson – horns
- Dan Levine – horns
- Chondra Sanchez – additional background vocals, voice of The All Mother
- Maggie Bryngelson – additional background vocals

=== Artwork ===
- Heidi Taillefer – cover art
- Nathan Spoor – interior art
- Bill Scoville – package design and additional graphics

== Charts ==
Chart (2013)	Peak position
UK Albums (Official Charts)	64
UK Rock Albums Chart	3
US Billboard 200	9
US Top Alternative Albums (Billboard)	3
US Independent Albums (Billboard)	3
US Top Rock Albums (Billboard)	3
US Indie Store Album Sales (Billboard)	3
