= Vaxis – Act I: The Unheavenly Creatures =

Studio album by Coheed and Cambria
- Released: October 5, 2018
- Recorded: January – March, 2018
- Genres: Progressive rock; emo; progressive metal; post-hardcore; hard rock
- Length: 79:19
- Label: Roadrunner
- Producers: Coheed and Cambria

Coheed and Cambria chronology
The Color Before the Sun (2015)	Vaxis – Act I: The Unheavenly Creatures (2018)	Vaxis – Act II: A Window of the Waking Mind (2022)

Singles from Vaxis – Act I: The Unheavenly Creatures
- 1. "The Dark Sentencer" Released: May 31, 2018; 2. "Unheavenly Creatures" Released: June 28, 2018; 3. "The Gutter" Released: August 16, 2018; 4. "Old Flames" Released: September 27, 2018; 5. "Love Protocol" Released: September 30, 2018

Vaxis – Act I: The Unheavenly Creatures is the ninth studio album by American progressive rock band Coheed and Cambria. It was released on October 5, 2018, returning to the band's Amory Wars concept after 2015's The Color Before the Sun.

== Background and recording ==
Recorded between January and March 2018, The Unheavenly Creatures continues the band's Amory Wars concept, unlike their previous album The Color Before the Sun. On May 31, 2018 the band released the first two tracks of the album, "Prologue" and "The Dark Sentencer", on YouTube. The track listing and album artwork were released on June 22, 2018 after days of teasers depicting fragments of the art. The band released the song "Unheavenly Creatures", which is the album's third track, on June 28. On August 16, "The Gutter" was released and on September 27, "Old Flames" was released.

The music of The Unheavenly Creatures has been described by music critics as progressive rock, progressive metal, and hard rock, noting many songs spanning influences such as heavy metal, indie rock, and post-punk.

== Release ==
The album was released on October 5, 2018. A deluxe box-set version of the album includes a novella written by the band's vocalist and guitarist Claudio Sanchez and his wife Chondra Echert, with artwork by Chase Stone, a replica "Creature" mask from the "Unheavenly Creatures" music video custom designed by Claudio Sanchez, a Coheed and Cambria "Black Card" that allows fans early access to tickets along with free entry into Coheed and Cambria headline shows and was valid until December 19, 2019, a three fold poster containing the album artwork, as well as a certificate of authenticity signed by the four members of the band and a demo CD, The Crown Heights Demos.

The song "Unheavenly Creatures" was released as downloadable content for the game Rock Band 4.

== Reception ==
Professional ratings
Aggregate scores
Source	Rating
Metacritic	75/100
Review scores
Source	Rating
AllMusic	4/5 stars
Classic Rock Magazine	2.5/5 stars
Dead Press	8/10
Exclaim!	7/10
Kerrang!	3/5
PopMatters	8/10 stars
Sputnikmusic	4.0/5

At Metacritic, which assigns a rating out of 100 to reviews from mainstream critics, Vaxis – Act I: The Unheavenly Creatures generated a score of 75/100 from seven reviews, indicating "generally favorable reviews".

== Track listing ==
All tracks are written by Claudio Sanchez.

Vaxis – Act I: The Unheavenly Creatures
No.	Title	Length
1.	"Prologue"	2:07
2.	"The Dark Sentencer"	7:44
3.	"Unheavenly Creatures"	4:14
4.	"Toys"	6:27
5.	"Black Sunday"	4:46
6.	"Queen of the Dark"	5:51
7.	"True Ugly"	5:25
8.	"Love Protocol"	4:29
9.	"The Pavilion (A Long Way Back)"	5:11
10.	"Night-Time Walkers"	5:09
11.	"The Gutter"	5:49
12.	"All on Fire"	5:40
13.	"It Walks Among Us"	5:29
14.	"Old Flames"	5:50
15.	"Lucky Stars"	5:08
Total length:		79:19

== Personnel ==
=== Coheed and Cambria ===
- Claudio Sanchez – lead vocals, rhythm guitar
- Travis Stever – lead guitar, backing vocals
- Josh Eppard – drums, percussion, keyboards, backing vocals
- Zach Cooper – bass guitar, backing vocals

=== Additional musicians ===
- Karl Berger – string arrangements, vibraphone
- Jason Hwang – viola
- Ernesto Llorens – violin
- Sana Nagano – violin
- Jane Scarpantoni – cello

=== Artwork ===
- Chase Stone

== Charts ==
Chart (2018)	Peak position
Australian Albums (ARIA)	49
Canadian Albums (Billboard)	58
German Albums (Offizielle Top 100)	46
Scottish Albums (Official Charts)	23
UK Albums (Official Charts)	36
US Billboard 200	14
