= The Afterman (Live Edition) =

Live album by Coheed and Cambria
- Released: August 13, 2013
- Recorded: Spring 2013 tour
- Genres: Progressive rock, progressive metal, new prog, alternative rock, post-hardcore
- Length: 57:34
- Label: Hundred Handed/Everything Evil
- Producers: Coheed and Cambria, Michael Birnbaum, Chris Bittner

Coheed and Cambria chronology
The Afterman: Descension (2013)	The Afterman (Live Edition) (2013)	The Color Before the Sun (2015)

The Afterman (Live Edition) is an album released by American progressive rock band Coheed and Cambria in 2013. It debuted at No. 47 on the Billboard Top Rock Albums chart. The album was also available bundled with the deluxe version of The Afterman, as the third disc alongside The Afterman: Ascension and The Afterman: Descension.

== Track listing ==
No.	Title	Recorded at	Length
1.	"2's My Favorite 1"	VIP Performance, Radio City Music Hall, New York City, NY, 16 March 2013	3:45
2.	"Pretelethal"	Electric Factory, Philadelphia, PA, 12 March 2013	5:01
3.	"Key Entity Extraction V: Sentry the Defiant"	Palladium, Dallas, TX, 3 March 2013	5:06
4.	"Key Entity Extraction II: Holly Wood the Cracked"	9:30 Club, Washington, DC, 5 February 2013	2:58
5.	"Goodnight, Fair Lady"	Congress Theater, Chicago, IL, 9 February 2013	3:09
6.	"Iron Fist"	9:30 Club, Washington, DC, 5 February 2013	4:56
7.	"Key Entity Extraction III: Vic the Butcher"	Wiltern Theater, Los Angeles, CA, 22 February 2013	5:45
8.	"Key Entity Extraction IV: Evagria the Faithful"	Ogden Theater, Denver, CO, 14 February 2013	7:52
9.	"The Afterman"	Club Soda, Montreal, QC, 20 March 2013	3:19
10.	"Dark Side of Me"	The Fillmore, Detroit, MI, 8 February 2013	5:15
11.	"Key Entity Extraction I: Domino the Destitute"	House of Blues, Boston, MA, 14 March 2013	10:28
