= Good Apollo, I'm Burning Star IV, Volume Two: No World for Tomorrow =

- Cover art by Ken Kelly

Studio album by Coheed and Cambria
- Released: October 23, 2007
- Recorded: April–June 2007
- Genres: Progressive rock; emo; progressive metal; hard rock; alternative metal
- Length: 59:54
- Label: Columbia
- Producers: Nick Raskulinecz; Rick Rubin

Coheed and Cambria chronology
Good Apollo, I'm Burning Star IV, Volume One: From Fear Through the Eyes of Madness (2005)	Good Apollo, I'm Burning Star IV, Volume Two: No World for Tomorrow (2007)	Year of the Black Rainbow (2010)

Singles from No World for Tomorrow
- 1. "The Running Free" Released: August 7, 2007; 2. "Feathers" Released: May 20, 2008

Good Apollo, I'm Burning Star IV, Volume Two: No World for Tomorrow (often shortened to No World for Tomorrow), is the fourth studio album by American progressive rock band Coheed and Cambria, released on October 23, 2007. The album is a direct sequel to their previous album, Good Apollo, I'm Burning Star IV, Volume One: From Fear Through the Eyes of Madness. The album comprises part four of band's Amory Wars narrative. It is the only album to feature Taylor Hawkins on drums, following the departure of Josh Eppard.

The album is often marketed by the shortened title No World for Tomorrow. Neither the disc itself nor its outer packaging suggest the Good Apollo title, though it is found printed on the cover of the accompanying lyrics booklet, as well as the rim of the fourth side of the vinyl release. Frontman Claudio Sanchez has stated that the full name of the album is in fact Good Apollo, I'm Burning Star IV, Volume Two: No World for Tomorrow.

The album debuted on the Billboard 200 album chart at No. 6, selling about 62,000 copies in its first week. It sold over 100,000 copies in its first month. As of January 2008, the record has sold over 350,000 copies, with 153,979 being sold in the US.

== Promotion ==
Leading up to the album's release, the songs "Mother Superior" and "The Running Free" were performed live on the band's tours. A July 2007 MTV article described the album as more experimental in comparison to the band's previous efforts. Sanchez detailed that for some tracks he had experimented with unfamiliar instrumentation including organs and pianos, creating a sound he described as "Ray Charles on Quaaludes." Some parts initially written on piano were later converted into intricate guitar segments.

In late July 2007 "The Running Free" was announced as the album's first single, and it was released to radio on August 20. The song was streamed on the band's MySpace profile and was made available through digital distribution on August 14.

Also in July 2007 an official website was launched for the album. The site featured weekly updates including a competition, video segments, album artwork and announcements regarding "The Running Free" single and its accompanying music video. A viral marketing video series entitled "The Willing Well" was released in five installments continuing until October 22.

In January 2008 a promotional website for the next single "Feathers" was created.

A guerilla marketing campaign took place in various locations across the country, including an incident on the University of Kansas campus in which someone spray painted the "Keywork" logo and the release date in several locations, resulting in a small panic related to a previous shooting on campus.

== Formats ==
There are three formats of the album; a 'Deluxe Edition' which includes a bonus 24 minute documentary feature on "The Making of NWFT" with interviews, footage from the studio, three never before heard acoustic demos (the other two from In Keeping Secrets of Silent Earth: 3 had previously leaked), a booklet with scenes from The Amory Wars, and over 50 photos from recent tours; a 'stripped' version, containing just the CD and a slip sleeve cover; and a 'double gatefold vinyl' version, in which the album comes on 2 LPs, featuring artwork by Ken Kelly. If pre-ordered, they would come with an autographed booklet but stock ran out the day after the prerelease was announced. Another promotional item, the No World for Tomorrow magnet, is still in stock.

== Critical reception ==
Professional ratings
Aggregate scores
Source	Rating
Metacritic	69/100
Review scores
Source	Rating
AbsolutePunk	91%
AllMusic	3.5/5 stars
The A.V. Club	B−
Blender	3.5/5 stars
Entertainment Weekly	B
Melodic	5/5 stars
NME	6/10
PopMatters	6/10
Rolling Stone	3/5 stars

The album received mostly positive reviews, with a Metacritic score of 69% based on 16 reviews. Entertainment Weekly noted that the band "infuse their expansive music with enough grit and melody that you don't give a hoot what, say 'The Hound (of Blood & Rank)' is 'about.'" Q gave it a score of four stars out of five and remarked that the album was "accessible" and "hugely appealing" because of how the album is immersed in Claudio Sanchez's personal life. Mojo also gave it four stars and hailed "Feathers" as "unabashed radio-rock" while Rolling Stone connected it to Uriah Heep's "Easy Livin'". AllMusic remarked that "listeners will find a number of enjoyable would-be singles", as well as stating that "the album is simple ear candy for those who haven't studied the band's previous releases". Blender voiced that "Coheed have found their sweet spot" and that they indulge "in grandiose, classic-rock, flaunting chops that could shame the showoffs in Rush". Virgin Media gave it four stars out of five, calling the album "an appealing addition to the prog canon". Melodic gave it all five stars and said, "The band delivers the best album to date and shows their growth and maturity to the fullest."

On the other hand, The A.V. Club claimed the album could "have been more inspired". Alternative Press gave it three stars out of five and reported that the record "simply doesn't deliver on all the suspense that's been loaded into it and built up to." Now also gave it three stars out of five as one of "Perlich's Picks" and said, "The aggression is still there, now tempered with lighter numbers like 'Feathers', but the whole thing still reeks of comic nerd sci-fi awesomeness." Others noted that the album sticks to a reliable formula that does not always help the progression of the album, especially with the outro of the last song "On the Brink" where they scream the word [Hail] 57 times. The Village Voice lamented that Coheed "slipped up" on this album. Spin gave the album a score of four out of ten and said it "should ensure that 21-year-old dudes in women's jeans will gobble up reissues of 2112 for years to come."

== Track listing ==
All lyrics are written by Claudio Sanchez; all music is composed by Coheed and Cambria, except "The Running Free" and "The End Complete IV: The Road and the Damned" by Claudio Sanchez, Sam Hollander and Dave Katz.

Good Apollo, I'm Burning Star IV, Volume Two: No World for Tomorrow
No.	Title	Length
1.	"The Reaping"	1:13
2.	"No World for Tomorrow"	5:05
3.	"The Hound (of Blood and Rank)"	4:38
4.	"Feathers"	4:55
5.	"The Running Free"	4:12
6.	"Mother Superior"	6:38
7.	"Gravemakers & Gunslingers"	4:20
8.	"Justice in Murder"	4:28
9.	"The End Complete I: The Fall of House Atlantic"	1:04
10.	"The End Complete II: Radio Bye Bye"	4:54
11.	"The End Complete III: The End Complete"	7:44
12.	"The End Complete IV: The Road and the Damned"	3:35
13.	"The End Complete V: On the Brink"	7:08
Total length:		59:54

=== Deluxe edition bonus DVD ===
1. "Mother Superior" (Taylor Guitars performance @ NAMM 07 – PCM stereo)
2. "Kitchen Jam" (PCM stereo)
3. "Cuts Marked in the March of Men" (original acoustic demo – PCM stereo)
4. "A Favor House Atlantic" (original acoustic demo – PCM stereo)
5. "The Willing Well II: From Fear Through the Eyes of Madness" (original acoustic demo – PCM stereo)
6. "The Suffering" (original Acoustic demo – PCM stereo)
7. "Always & Never / Welcome Home" (original acoustic demo – PCM stereo)
8. Tour photo album (PCM stereo)
9. "Always & Never / Welcome Home" (audio bed)

=== 180-gram vinyl ===
No World for Tomorrow was also released on 180 gram double LP vinyl, pressed at Nashville's United Record Pressing. The first three sides feature the same songs as the CD version but the fourth side features etched artwork incorporating the band's logo. It is packaged in a double gatefold jacket.

All lyrics are written by Claudio Sanchez; all music is composed by Coheed and Cambria, except "The Running Free" and "The End Complete IV: The Road and the Damned" by Claudio Sanchez, Sam Hollander and Dave Katz.

Side one
No.	Title	Length
1.	"The Reaping"	1:13
2.	"No World for Tomorrow"	5:06
3.	"The Hound (Of Blood and Rank)"	4:38
4.	"Feathers"	4:55

Side two
No.	Title	Length
1.	"The Running Free"	4:16
2.	"Mother Superior"	6:38
3.	"Gravemakers & Gunslingers"	4:21
4.	"Justice in Murder"	4:28

Side three (The End Complete)
No.	Title	Length
1.	"The End Complete": I. "The Fall of House Atlantic" (Instrumental) (1:04); II. "Radio Bye Bye" (4:54); III. "The End Complete" (7:44); IV. "The Road and the Damned" (3:35); V. "On the Brink" (7:08)"	23:25

- Side four contains no music but features etched art on the surface of the vinyl.

== Personnel ==
Coheed and Cambria

- Claudio Sanchez – lead vocals, guitars, keyboards, synthesizers
- Travis Stever – guitars, backing vocals
- Michael Todd – bass guitar
- Taylor Hawkins – recording drums

(Chris Pennie wrote the original drum parts but was unable to record due to contract issues)

With:

- Rami Jaffee – piano, synthesizers
- Stevie Blacke – violin, viola, cello, string arrangements
- Chondra Echert – backing vocals on "Gravemakers and Gunslingers"
- Nicholas Manrique Gardner – backing bass and vocals on "The End Complete II: Radio Bye Bye"

== Charts ==
=== Album ===
Chart (2007)	Peak position
Australian Albums (ARIA)	39
Canadian Albums (Billboard)	22
UK Albums (Official Charts)	41
US Billboard 200	6
US Top Rock Albums (Billboard)	3
US Top Hard Rock Albums (Billboard)	2

=== Singles ===
Year	Single	Chart	Peak position
2007	"The Running Free"	US Modern Rock Tracks	19
2007	"The Running Free"	US Mainstream Rock Tracks	31
