= The Amory Wars =

Science fiction franchise

Publication information
- Publisher: Evil Ink Comics
- Format: (Vol. 1) 10 Issues (Vol. 2) 12 Issues (Vol. 3) 10 Issues (Vol. 4) 4 Issues
- No. of issues: 36

Creative team
- Written by: Claudio Sanchez, Chondra Echert
- Artist: Rags Morales
- Colorist: Emilio Lopez
- Editor: Blaze James

The Amory Wars is an ongoing series of science fiction comic books and novels created by American musician-author Claudio Sanchez (of the musical group Coheed and Cambria) in collaboration with Chondra Echert and others, and published by Evil Ink Comics. The name also refers to the fictional conflict at the center of the story, which is told across the published works, and is also the primary focus of most of the band's music.

The multimedia franchise originates with Coheed and Cambria's studio albums (with the exception of 2015's The Color Before the Sun) each of which tells a chapter in the saga originally narrated by Sanchez's lyrics. The band also makes use of recurring melodies, self-referencing musical and lyrical cues in certain songs that reference key moments in The Amory Wars mythology. Some individual songs on these albums (e.g., "The Crowing", "Everything Evil", "Three Evils") use a particular song structure named by Brad Osborn as the "terminally climactic form" in order to depict a particularly violent action from the story.

The mythos is not wholly comprehensible through the music and lyrics alone. Sanchez created The Amory Wars comics and novels to better depict the story's events and characters.

== Plot summary ==
The Amory Wars is set in Heaven's Fence, a collection of 78 planets and seven stars, held in place by interconnecting beams of energy known as the “Keywork”.

Year of the Black Rainbow and The Second Stage Turbine Blade narrate the struggle of Coheed and Cambria Kilgannon against Wilhelm Ryan, the Supreme Tri-Mage who launches a war campaign with the intended goal to rule over Heaven's Fence.

The story arcs In Keeping Secrets of Silent Earth: 3, Good Apollo, I'm Burning Star IV, Volume One: From Fear Through the Eyes of Madness, and Good Apollo, I'm Burning Star IV, Volume Two: No World for Tomorrow focus on the heroic journey of Claudio Kilgannon, son of Coheed and Cambria, and his journey to assume the mantle of The Crowing, foretold savior of Heaven's Fence.

Set long before the events of the previous chapters, The Afterman: Ascension and The Afterman: Descension tell the story of Dr. Sirius Amory, a scientist who enters the Keywork in an attempt to understand its mysterious energy.

Vaxis – Act I: The Unheavenly Creatures is the first of five story arcs that continue the original Amory Wars saga and follows the story of Creature and Sister Spider, who are incarcerated within the prison planet known as the Dark Sentencer.

== Timeline ==
The story arcs within The Amory Wars universe follow a fictional timeline, and are connected by continuity of events, characters, and locations. Coheed and Cambria's first four studio album releases told the main story in non-chronological order.

1. The Second Stage Turbine Blade
2. In Keeping Secrets of Silent Earth: 3
3. Good Apollo, I'm Burning Star IV, Volume One: From Fear Through the Eyes of Madness
4. Good Apollo, I'm Burning Star IV, Volume Two: No World for Tomorrow

2010's Year of the Black Rainbow acts as a prequel that sets up the events that take place in the previous four albums, following many of the same characters.

Together, The Afterman: Ascension (2012) and The Afterman: Descension (2013) told a new story set even earlier in the timeline than the first five releases. These albums focused on new characters while elaborating on previously introduced concepts.

The 2018 album Vaxis – Act I: The Unheavenly Creatures is the first story arc to take place after the original tetralogy. Much like The Afterman albums, it focuses on an entirely new cast and setting within the Amory Wars universe. This chapter is set to be the first of five in the Vaxis story arc, and its connections to the previous events in the timeline will become more apparent in the coming iterations. It was followed by Vaxis – Act II: A Window of the Waking Mind in 2022 and Vaxis – Act III: The Father of Make Believe in 2025.

== Production ==
In 2004, the first graphic series related to the Amory Wars was published with Evil Ink's release of The Bag on Line Adventures: The Second Stage Turbine Blade, written by Claudio Sanchez and illustrated by Wes Abbott. However, after two issues were published, the project was discontinued due to creative roadblocks including Sanchez's touring schedule with Coheed and Cambria. These original issues were later included in The Amory Wars: The Second Stage Turbine Blade Ultimate Edition.

Evil Ink then released the Good Apollo, I’m Burning Star IV: Volume One – From Fear Through the Eyes of Madness graphic novel in 2005 to accompany the release of Coheed and Cambria's third studio album of the same name. This publication was again written by Sanchez, and illustrated by Christopher Shy. Unlike the previous release for Second Stage Turbine Blade, this graphic novel told the entire story of the Good Apollo Vol. 1 album, though many details were still unclear.

During a 2006 interview, Claudio cited financial constraints for the irregular and unfinished release of the story's publications, and explained that Evil Ink intended to publish new comics under the title The Amory Wars that would retell the concept chronologically.

Throughout 2007, Evil Ink released the first volume of The Amory Wars: The Second Stage Turbine Blade, which consisted of five issues written by Claudio Sanchez and illustrated by Gus Vasquez (Chapters 1 and 2) and Mike S. Miller (Chapters 3 - 5). The second volume was released over the course of 2008, consisting of five more chapters written by Sanchez with artist Gabriel Guzman providing illustration. On August 15, 2017, BOOM! Studios released The Amory Wars: The Second Stage Turbine Blade Ultimate Edition, which included all 10 issues, as well as the both issues original out-of-print Bag On Line Adventures: The Second Stage Turbine Blade, and a new bonus story – 33 written by Sanchez and illustrated by Dave Hamann.

On April 13, 2010, Coheed and Cambria released their fifth studio album Year of the Black Rainbow. The deluxe version of the album included a novel co-written by Sanchez and Peter David, which narrates the album's story, which takes place prior to the events of The Second Stage Turbine Blade and acts as a prequel to The Amory Wars saga.

In 2010, Claudio again enlisted David to co-write the comic adaptation of the band's second studio album. Evil Ink released the first issue of The Amory Wars: In Keeping Secrets of Silent Earth: 3 on May 26, 2010. The story was told across a series of 12 comics released throughout 2010 and 2011, with Chris Burnham illustrating chapters 1 – 7, and Aaron Kuder illustrating the remaining 8 – 12. All twelve chapters were later compiled and released as The Amory Wars: In Keeping Secrets of Silent Earth: 3 Ultimate Edition by BOOM! Studios on April 10, 2018.

Coheed and Cambria's sixth and seventh albums, respectively titled The Afterman: Ascension (released 2012) and The Afterman: Descension (released 2013), each had their story told in a similar manner to Year of the Black Rainbow. The albums’ Deluxe Editions each included a limited-edition coffee table book that featured the story of each song written by Sanchez and illustrations Nathan Spoor.

The band announced on January 24, 2017, that Evil Ink would be releasing The Amory Wars: Good Apollo, I'm Burning Star IV, Volume One: From Fear Through the Eyes of Madness to coincide with their anniversary tour for their third studio album (dubbed Neverender: GAIBSIV). Co-written by Sanchez and his wife Chondra Echert, this new adaptation told the full version of the album's story than depicted in the 2004 graphic novel. The story was illustrated by Rags Morales, and released across twelve issues that ran from April 5, 2017, through October 10, 2018. As with the first two installments of The Amory Wars comics, BOOM! Studios released a hardcover Ultimate Edition on October 8, 2019, which includes all twelve issues as well as the original graphic novel.

After taking a break from their mythology on their 2015 album, The Color Before the Sun, Coheed and Cambria released their ninth album, Vaxis – Act I: The Unheavenly Creatures, on October 5, 2018. The album began a new story set after the events of the previous album's mythology, and the deluxe box-set version of the album included a novella written by Sanchez and Echert with illustrations by artist Chase Stone.

After being announced at the No World For Tomorrow Neverender tour, during which the band performed the entirety of Good Apollo, I'm Burning Star IV, Volume Two: No World for Tomorrow, the fourth and final comic in the series began distribution in May 2024. The series was also released on Backerkit, with special alternate covers available for preorders. The final four issues in No World For Tomorrow were collected into a single volume set released on December 25 of the same year.

== The Bag.On.Line Adventures ==
The original name of the story was The Bag.On.Line Adventures of Coheed and Cambria. This would also be the name of the first chapter of their story and the respective album (chronologically, from the story's standpoint, Bag.On.Line Adventures would come before Second Stage Turbine Blade).

The Bag.On.Line Adventures would essentially work as a prequel and would follow the story of Coheed, Cambria, and Jesse as part of an anti-terrorist agency called the K.B.I., which stood for the Knowledge (referring to Cambria and her ability to see the future and other events), the Beast (referring to Coheed and his ability to fight his way out of basically any tight situation), and the Inferno (referring to Jesse, the burning heart and soul of the KBI).

The name "Bag.On.Line" came from a shop across from Claudio Sanchez's apartment during the trip to Paris in which he first conceptualized the Coheed and Cambria saga.

Since then, Coheed & Cambria have released the prequel to Second Stage Turbine Blade, titled Year of the Black Rainbow.

== The Amory Wars Sketchbook ==
After Sanchez changed the name to The Amory Wars, he also released a sketchbook, illustrated by Gus Vasquez, which plots out the next comic. Originally dubbed "Comic Zero", "The Amory Wars Sketchbook" was released at ComicCon. Later, the Evil Ink website began selling the sketchbook in limited release. This comic explains the very beginning of the Keywork and Heaven's Fence. Years pass and the comic ends introducing Coheed Kilgannon on his home planet of Hetricus.

== The Second Stage Turbine Blade ==
First released in the summer of 2004, the original two comic books narrate the events of approximately the first third of Coheed and Cambria's concept album The Second Stage Turbine Blade of 2002. They introduce central characters, including the villains Wilhelm Ryan and Mayo Deftinwolf who orchestrate a sinister plot to murder the children of Coheed and Cambria Kilgannon in order to use the dormant Monstar virus hidden within Coheed to destroy the Keywork. Claudio Kilgannon escapes murder at the hands of his parents, who have been tricked into believing that their children may cause the destruction of humanity if left alive, and becomes the protagonist of later chapters. These early issues, which were inked by Wes Abbott, are now out of print.

Gus Vasquez began illustrating the re-release of The Amory Wars, which begins with the first issue of The Second Stage Turbine Blade. Vasquez's participation in the production of this series was short-lived as Mike Miller took over after the second issue and illustrated 3–5. The first five issues in the miniseries represent "The Second Stage Turbine Blade: Volume 1" and cover the first half of the chapter. The first issue was released June 13, and subsequent issues were released monthly. It was published by Claudio's company Evil Ink Comics along with the help of Image Comics and 12 Gauge Comics, and cover art was illustrated by Tony Moore of The Walking Dead fame. The first five issues were released as a paperback graphic novel with a brand new cover by usual cover artist Tony Moore. A special variant cover was released as well and only sold in Hot Topic retail stores. The 5 issues (6–10) in Part II were illustrated by Gabriel Guzman and were released as a paperback graphic novel with cover art by Tony Moore on December 9, 2009.

In August 2010, these two volumes of five comics were released together in a single hardcover edition titled "The Amory Wars: Ultimate Edition". The two original issues by Wes Abbott, as well as the cover artwork for all twelve comics are also included in the back of this 350-page release.

== In Keeping Secrets of Silent Earth: 3 ==
The second part of the Amory Wars, In Keeping Secrets of Silent Earth: 3 is a twelve-part comic series written by Claudio Sanchez and Peter David, who both co-wrote the Year of the Black Rainbow novel, with artwork by Chris Burnham. The first issue was released on May 26, 2010, and the second issue was released on June 23, 2010. The series was later collected into three trade paperback volumes each containing four issues. The corresponding album of the same name from Coheed and Cambria was released in late 2003. A small summary of the chapter's plot was published on the former Evil Ink Comics website:

Ten years after the "…Turbine Blade", son Claudio emerges from the depths of Shylos Ten, the Fence's "quiet" planet where the Red Army performs its brutal interrogations and imprisonments. In finding out that his entire family has been murdered, Claudio begins his quest for vendetta. His foes, Supreme Tri-Mage Wilhelm Ryan and General Mayo Deftinwolf sense that he is still alive and holds special powers. They know they must stop him before he defeats them. Meanwhile, Inferno (Jesse Kilgannon) takes up arms against the Red Army (“Man your Battlestations”) in an effort to seek the same kind of vengeance on him. In Claudio’s re-emergence he teams up with Ambellina, the Prise who is cast out by her peers and forced to be his guide. The pair along with Sizer, a disassembled IRO-bot, seek out Inferno to find answers as to why his family were killed, but their plans take an unexpected turn in a ship called The Camper Velourium, piloted by a believed to be racist psychopath named Al.

== Good Apollo, I'm Burning Star IV, Volume One: From Fear Through the Eyes of Madness ==

A graphic novel titled Good Apollo, I'm Burning Star IV, Volume One: From Fear Through the Eyes of Madness, illustrated by Christopher Shy, was released in September 2005 along with the album of the same name. Good Apollo takes a step outside the science fiction narrative and reveals an unnamed writer who created the story. Through a series of delusional conversations with his ten speed bicycle about an unfaithful former lover, the writer decides to kill off Prise Ambellina to properly end his story. Within the narrative, a final confrontation takes place between Jesse's rebel forces and the Red Army of Supreme Tri-Mage Wilhelm Ryan. A literal meeting of the writer and Claudio culminates in the death of Ambellina and Claudio's emergence as the Crowing.

The new Amory Wars series, illustrated by Rags Morales, retells the story of Good Apollo. Claudio stated that much was lost from the graphic novel owing to financial constraints. He opined that the original artwork, while in his opinion beautiful, was not the best medium to convey the story. Claudio looks forward to releasing a new version in chronological order so that the story will make more sense.

== The Amory Wars: Good Apollo ==
The first issue of The Amory Wars: Good Apollo released on April 5th, 2017 by Evil Ink Comics and BOOM! Studios. Illustrated by Rags Morales with colors by Emilio Lopez, this series chronicles the main plot points of the original graphic novel and also sets the stage for the next series with a twist in the final confrontation between Jesse and Mayo Deftinwolf.

The Good Apollo series concluded on October 10th, 2018. It was collected in three trade paperbacks.

== Good Apollo, I'm Burning Star IV, Volume Two: No World for Tomorrow ==
No story mediums for Good Apollo, I'm Burning Star IV, Volume Two: No World for Tomorrow were released alongside the album itself. However, in 2024, BOOM! Studios announced that No World for Tomorrow would be released in a 12-issue limited series, written by Claudio Sanchez and Chondra Echert and illustrated by Guillaume Martinez, starting in May 2024.

Claudio Kilgannon was thought dead by the Red Army, but rising suspicion sends them on a hunt to discover his true fate. If Claudio is in fact alive, he’ll be in dire straits amidst the mystery and mayhem that’s about to unfold…

“I’m very excited to share the final installment of the Coheed and Cambria portion of the Amory Wars. The adventure gets quite wild when Chase and The Crowing have control of the Willing Well and the outcome feels very rewarding.” said The Amory Wars author and Coheed and Cambria frontman, Claudio Sanchez.

- BOOM! Studios, AMORY WARS: NO WORLD FOR TOMORROW Series Announcement

== Year of the Black Rainbow ==
Year of the Black Rainbow is the prequel of the Amory Wars. The album of the same name was released April 13, 2010, and with it came a 352-page novel detailing the events of the story. It tells of how Wilhelm Ryan came to power by killing or abducting all the other Mages. A mysterious black rainbow also appears in the sky the day Ryan takes supremacy. A civilian, named Doctor Leonard Hohenberger, is dissatisfied with the Supreme Tri-Mage's rule and is inspired by the Prise to create three IRO-bots, known as the KBI: Cambria ("Knowledge"), Coheed ("Beast"), and Jesse ("Inferno"). While the KBI are out on the other planets of Heaven's Fence, destroying everything Ryan had made, Hohenberger's wife, Pearl, is kidnapped by Mayo Deftinwolf. Deftinwolf offers the Doctor an ultimatum; if the Doctor will help Ryan create a virus that has the potential to destroy Heaven's Fence (the Monstar virus), Pearl will be returned to him. If Hohenberger refuses, Pearl dies. Leonard creates the virus, but locks it inside the bodies of Coheed and Cambria so Ryan cannot immediately use it, giving the Doctor time to create a cure. Ryan takes Coheed and Cambria to his stronghold to figure out how to extract the virus. In return for his treachery, the Tri-Mage sends Pearl back with a gun, after telling her that Leonard had helped Ryan cause the downfall of the universe. However, back home, Pearl finds she cannot kill her husband, and instead kills herself. Leonard leaves a set of instructions for Inferno, and sets out to get revenge by attempting to kill Mayo Deftinwolf. The assassination fails, and the Doctor himself is killed instead. Meanwhile, Inferno follows the Doctor's instructions and discovers he has made a cure for the Monstar in the form of another IRO-bot, named Josephine. With new hope, Inferno flies to Ryan's stronghold, the House Atlantic. He breaks in and saves Coheed and Cambria, mutilating Deftinwolf in the process. While Inferno is gone, his troops rain down firepower on the House Atlantic from their ship, the Grail Arbor. After the KBI have left, the Grail Arbor fully destroys House Atlantic. Ryan himself almost dies, but is rescued at the last moment by Vielar Crom, a soldier taken from one of the opposing Mages' armies. Ryan vows for revenge as he flies off. The black rainbow also disappears once he is gone. Meanwhile, in the epilogue of the story, Inferno, still following Hohenberger's orders, wipes the minds of Coheed and Cambria to make them think they are an ordinary couple and Josephine is their newborn daughter. He wishes them the best as they begin their new lives with no memory of the KBI or the events of this story.

== The Afterman ==
A compilation of the lyrics, artwork, and story content associated with The Afterman: Ascension, written by Claudio Sanchez and co-written by Peter David, was released with the deluxe edition on October 9, 2012. The story chronologically precedes the events that take place in the Year of the Black Rainbow. However, it is technically not a part of The Amory Wars saga, even though it takes place within the same universe.

=== Ascension ===
Focusing on the famous cosmonaut Sirius Amory (pronounced SY-rus A-mer-EE), the story describes Amory's scientific investigation of "the Keywork", which, up until this point, has only been identified as a mysterious energy source that supplies nutrients to the 78 planets that make up Heaven's Fence. This expedition is overwhelmingly discouraged by Amory's wife, Meri, who considers it to be nothing short of suicide. Despite Meri's disapproval, Sirius goes forward with his mission. As the sole passenger on his spacecraft, the Meriwell, Amory's only companion is a computer system known as the All Mother, which also operates inside his spacesuit. The All Mother is tasked with analyzing and reporting Sirius' vital conditions throughout his mission as well as recording his findings. In order to obtain samples of the Keywork, Sirius leaves his ship and enters the energy source, his suit and the All Mother being the only things preventing him from instantaneous death. Quickly, Amory identifies the true source of the Keywork's energy as being the souls of those that have died. The souls maintain the characteristics and personalities of their previous lives and have the ability to infuse themselves with Amory. The first entity to come into contact with Sirius is Domino the Destitute. As the entity takes control of the cosmonaut, Amory relives the life of Domino.

==== Domino the Destitute ====
In life, Domino was an up-and-coming boxer who, with the help of his brother Chess, achieved victories and attracted the attention of a crime boss, Kriptor Noncruss. Despite initial success, Domino allowed the world of fortune and fame to corrupt him. Over-indulgence in alcohol and drugs resulted in him faltering in the abilities he had worked so hard to achieve and severely strained the relationship between him and his brother. The final effort to save his career, which involved him going toe-to-toe with a champion boxer known as the Saul "the Ghostmaker" Maven, resulted in Domino getting knocked out in the last round. After this failure, Domino was left bankrupt and homeless. As the last chance to redeem himself, Kriptor ordered Domino to rob an armored truck. He then enticed his brother to join him with the promise of fortune, a proposal to which Chess agreed. The robbery went awry, resulting in the death of Chess. After watching his brother die, Domino committed suicide.

Back in the Keywork, the entity of Domino the Destitute releases a destructive frequency through the All Mother, destroying Sirius' ship and severely injuring Amory in the process. The destruction of his ship is identified by scientists and it is declared that Sirius Amory had died in the explosion. Meri curses Sirius for being selfish and taking it upon himself to find the answers of Heaven's Fence. She goes to a bar in order to deal with her emotions and is almost drugged with a benzodiazepine, saved only by a police officer who witnessed a man slip the pill into her drink. It is then foreshadowed that this police officer would become Meri's new love interest.

In the Keywork, Sirius remains vulnerable to the entities. The next spirit to take control of him is Holly Wood the Cracked.

==== Holly Wood the Cracked ====
In life, Holly Wood was a fanatical follower of an artist known as Madame Crisis Maroe (MCM). Through plastic surgery and physical alterations, Holly Wood attempted, at all costs, to become an exact replication of MCM. The surgeries backfired and left her physically deformed. Coping with insanity, Holly Wood decided that the only way to become MCM was to kill the artist and take her place. Witnessing the events first hand, as if he were Holly Wood, Sirius tries at all costs to stop the murder but is unsuccessful. Immediately after being released from the entity of Holly Wood the Cracked, a third entity takes control of Sirius.

==== Vic the Butcher ====
In life, Vic the Butcher was a decorated military general. He committed atrocious war crimes but hid them from the public by harming the soldiers under him and threatening their families if they reported him. One soldier, known as Sentry, refused to cave to these threats and stood up to Vic. This resulted in Sentry being hanged and Vic moving on with his life. Years later, Vic is indicted for his human rights violations. Instead of facing his inner demons, Vic sets his apartment, room 184, on fire. This results in the entire building burning down, including a nursery on the first floor.

Sirius is then released from Vic the Butcher and receives severe health warnings from the All Mother. He is on the verge of death and has no method of going home. Just in time, a completely different type of entity takes control of him, protecting him from the grasps of Domino, Holly and Vic, and begins to soothe his wounds.

==== Evagria the Faithful ====
In life, Evagria spent countless hours helping those in need and attempting to improve the lives of the people around her. As she aged, Evagria was diagnosed with a rare and incurable bone disease. Surrounded by her loving friends and family, Evagria succumbed to the disease and died.

Inside the Keywork, Evagria takes Sirius (now identified by the entities as The Afterman) to the next plane of the afterlife. The end of The Afterman: Ascension describes Sirius' admittance that he was unfair to Meri, putting his own ambitions before her well-being and emotional security. He becomes regretful of his decisions as he slips even further into the Keywork.

=== Descension ===
The Afterman: Descension begins with Sirius still encompassed in the protective aura of Evagria; however, she has become weakened due to the cost of energy necessary to keep The Afterman alive. As her power drains, Amory is convinced that these will be the last moments of his life. It is at this crucial time that Sirius is saved by the entity of Sentry the Defiant, the soldier who gave his life to evince the brutality of Vic the Butcher.

==== Sentry the Defiant ====
In life, Sentry was the opposite of Vic. He worked his way up the ranks through hard work and conviction. When ordered by Vic to bomb an off-world structure, which would undoubtedly cause the deaths of innocent people, Sentry defies the order and tells another Sergeant about Vic's ruthlessness. Planning to report the incident to the field marshal, Sentry is hanged in the barracks by Vic. Out of fear, the murder was not reported for years until an overwhelming amount of evidence against Vic entices individuals to speak out against his war crimes.

As the entities of Vic and Sentry continue to battle in the Keywork, Sirius realizes that Sentry must forgo his worldly emotions and move on in the afterlife. Conversing with Sentry, Amory convinces him that the entity's existence is not defined by one event. Realizing this, Sentry crosses over into the second plane of the Keywork, known as the dimension of enlightenment, or, the Samaritaine. Sirius is left defenseless against a swarm of malevolent entities that are approaching to occupy his body and mind. Once again, Evagria intervenes and carries Sirius with her to the dimension of enlightenment. Unable to remain in this dimension, Evagria shows him how to exit the Keywork. Once released, the All Mother unsuccessfully attempts to reestablish communication with the remains of the Meriwell. The Afterman's only other option is to use the suit to land on an orbiting space station. At this time the All Mother reveals that, although what seemed to Sirius to be a week inside the Keywork, it has actually been 547 days since he began his mission. Sirius successfully lands on the space station and is offered assistance in returning home.

==== Post-Keywork events ====
Upon returning to his home planet of Valencine, Sirius is conflicted with the idea of sharing what he has learned. He seeks the advice of his long-time mentor, Dr. Allen Linkev, who argues that the discovery of an afterlife, where the acceptance of one's soul is not determined by that person's actions in life, could cause mass chaos and a fundamental existential crisis. Sirius' indecision causes the intervention of the Prise, an angelic species tasked with the protection of Heaven's Fence. The Prise explain to Amory that the secrets of the Keywork were meant to be known by them, and "God", alone and that any disclosure of his findings would be considered an act of war.

Heeding the Prise's directions, Amory lies to the public about his findings and substitutes a physics laden explanation of how the Keywork operates. Having pleased the public with his explanations, Sirius turns to the daunting task of mending his relationship with Meri, who has come to terms with The Afterman's assumed death and has engaged in a relationship with Colten, the police officer who prevented her from consuming a spiked beverage.

Sirius is awarded The Amory Award, a recognition of scientific achievement created in his honor. After the ceremony, Sirius and Meri are driving home for the first time in over a year. Meri reveals that although she loves Sirius, she can no longer be with him. She confesses her relationship with Colten and the fact that she is 3 months pregnant with his offspring. Shocked by the news, Sirius loses control of the vehicle and wrecks, causing both of them to be ejected. At the hospital, Sirius' life is saved. Meri suffers a miscarriage and, despite the doctors' best efforts, dies. Meri then enters the Keywork as a spiritual entity.

Devastated, Sirius contemplates suicide and blames himself for not providing Meri with the two things she desired most: his attention and a child. Returning from the hospital, Sirius encounters Colten, who interrogates The Afterman as to why he couldn't let Meri go and remain in the Keywork.

An unknown amount of time passes. Sirius reconnects with the All Mother and acquires a new ship, Saudade, through funding from the scientific community. He programs the coordinates to reach the Keywork and is questioned by the All Mother regarding his overarching goals. His sole mission has become to re-enter the Keywork, find Meri, and help her transcend into the Samaritaine.

== Main characters ==
- Coheed Kilgannon - Husband of Cambria and harbors the Monstar virus, which, when triggered, causes the cooling of the star transformers that hold planets in the Keywork. Previously a member of K.B.I., Coheed being the B: Beast. He possesses blades in his left arm and can transform his right into a gun. He is killed by Cambria during a conflict when he becomes the Monstar.
- Cambria Kilgannon - Wife of Coheed, and possesses some type of psychic or clairvoyant ability. Previously a member of K.B.I., Cambria being the K: Knowledge. She commits suicide after killing her husband to save Earth III.
- Claudio Kilgannon - Son of Coheed & Cambria and the only known survivor of his family. After meeting his 'uncle' Jesse, the two plan to destroy Heaven's Fence and kill Wilhelm Ryan. Ambellina explains to Claudio that he is also The Crowing, a messiah who will save the souls of the Keywork by destroying it; however, he is not willing to accept this fate until the climax of Good Apollo I'm Burning Star IV Vol.1: From Fear Through The Eyes Of Madness.
- Jesse - Although commonly referred to as Coheed's brother, Jesse (like Coheed) is an IRO-bot. Jesse leads the rebels in war against Wilhelm Ryan. The third member of K.B.I., Inferno, Jesse is said to have created five new IRO-bots. Jesse is also a boxer and goes by the name of The Prize Fighter Inferno.
- Mariah Antillarea - Originally believed to be the Messiah, Mariah is the leader of a rebellion against Wilhelm Ryan. She is also married to Jesse.
- Ambellina - A Prise. Ambellina burns off her wings to be more human at the order of the other Prise. She is sent to guide Claudio to his destiny as The Crowing. Like the rest of the Prise, her mission is to watch over the Keywork and see that God's will is carried out. She represents the future the Writer could have had with his former girlfriend Erica Court.
- Wilhelm Ryan - The Supreme Tri-Mage of the Keywork. He gained control of the Keywork during the Mage Wars when he claimed dominion over the other Mages. Ryan tried to use Coheed and Cambria to destroy Mariah because of her threat to his rule. When his plan failed she was killed by Mayo Deftinwolf. He now fights the rebel army, which is led by Jesse.
- The Writer - Also referred to as The Writing Writer, the issues in his own life make him see delusions that cause him to take out his own suffering on the characters in his story. The story gets darker as his own problems grow. He doesn't want The Character (Claudio) to feel the same pain that he feels, so he interferes with the story. He sees the visions of Ten Speed who manipulates his thinking.
- Ten Speed - The manifestation of The Writer's ill will and malice that takes the form of his 10 speed bicycle. Ten Speed convinces the Writer that he needs to kill off Ambellina in order to end the story.
- Erica Court - The Writer's former lover, memories of whom cause him to descend into madness and interfere with the story of Heaven's Fence. It is hinted that The Writer once asked Erica Court to marry him (The Suffering), and that at some point in the relationship he turned hostile (Welcome Home).
- Josephine Kilgannon - Oldest child of Coheed and Cambria and fiancé of Patrick McCormick. An IRO-Bot created by Dr. Hohenberger to serve as the antidote to Coheed's Monstar virus, Josie possesses a telepathic link with Cambria. Josie is assaulted and raped by a gang called the Jersey City Devils and is later murdered by Coheed after he was deceived by Mayo.
- Leonard Hohenberger - Scientist that created the K.B.I. and Josephine, he also created the Monstar virus to save his wife Pearl from the hands of Ryan by giving Ryan himself the weapon that would start the end of the worlds.
- Sirius Amory - Cosmonaut that identified the source of The Keywork and the 7 suns that make up Heaven's Fence. On a mission to collect data on The Keywork, Sirius is stranded in the energy source and becomes a vessel for which souls relive their lives.

== Film adaptation ==
On December 2, 2012, Mark Wahlberg announced he will be producing a film adaptation of The Amory Wars. In February 2019, conversation once again turned to adaptation of The Amory Wars when a petition created on the platform Change.org the prior year began to gain traction. Though no official reports from the creators have confirmed a project, support from fans and news reports sparked a campaign displaying interest in a series on Netflix. In September 2019, Sanchez revealed that Wahlberg's agreement to produce the project had since expired.
