= The Running Free =

Single by Coheed and Cambria

from the album Good Apollo, I'm Burning Star IV, Volume Two: No World for Tomorrow
- Released: August 7, 2007
- Recorded: 2007
- Genre: Progressive rock; hard rock
- Length: 4:18 (album version); 3:43 (radio edit)
- Label: Columbia
- Composers: Claudio Sanchez; Sam Hollander; Dave Katz
- Producers: Nick Raskulinecz; Coheed and Cambria

Coheed and Cambria singles chronology
"Ten Speed (of God's Blood and Burial)" (2006)	"The Running Free" (2007)	"Feathers" (2008)

"The Running Free" is a song by American progressive rock band Coheed and Cambria. The song was released as the lead single from the band's fourth studio album Good Apollo, I'm Burning Star IV, Volume Two: No World for Tomorrow.

== Track listing ==
Promo single

No.	Title	Length
1.	"The Running Free" (Radio Edit)	3:43
2.	"The Running Free" (Album Version)	4:18

7" single

Side A
No.	Title	Length
1.	"The Running Free"	4:18

Side B
No.	Title	Length
1.	"Always & Never / Welcome Home" (Original Acoustic Demo)	7:47

== Personnel ==
Coheed and Cambria

- Claudio Sanchez – vocals, rhythm guitar, keyboards, synths
- Travis Stever – lead guitar
- Michael Todd – bass

Session musicians

- Taylor Hawkins – drums

Additional musicians

- Rami Jaffee – synths

== Charts ==
Chart (2007)	Peak position
US Alternative Airplay (Billboard)	19
US Active Rock (Billboard)	30
US Mainstream Rock (Billboard)	31

== In popular culture ==
The song was featured on the soundtrack of NHL 09.
