= Vaxis – Act II: A Window of the Waking Mind =

Studio album by Coheed and Cambria
- Released: June 24, 2022
- Recorded: 2021
- Genre: Progressive rock; hard rock; electronic rock; alternative rock
- Length: 53:03
- Label: Roadrunner
- Producer: Claudio Sanchez; Zakk Cervini

Coheed and Cambria chronology
Vaxis – Act I: The Unheavenly Creatures (2018)	Vaxis – Act II: A Window of the Waking Mind (2022)	Vaxis – Act III: The Father of Make Believe (2025)

Singles from Vaxis – Act II: A Window of the Waking Mind
- 1. "Shoulders" Released: July 21, 2021; 2. "Rise, Naianasha (Cut the Cord)" Released: November 10, 2021; 3. "The Liars Club" Released: February 22, 2022; 4. "Comatose" Released: May 18, 2022

Vaxis – Act II: A Window of the Waking Mind is the tenth studio album by American progressive rock band Coheed and Cambria. The album, like most of the studio albums from the band, is a concept album that continues the Amory Wars storyline. It was released on June 24, 2022.

== Writing and recording ==
Work on the album traces back to 2019; in May 2020, frontman Claudio Sanchez stated that approximately 75% of the album had been written. Sanchez noted that while he had the general concept of the album's story outlined, he was struggling with some of its themes in the wake of the breakout of the COVID-19 pandemic. He recounted starting a song called "Hallelujah Quarantine" in September 2019 that was themed around a criminal organization that misused voluntary quarantines to steal from people, a concept that, when written, seemed harmless, but upon the onset of COVID-19 lockdowns and controversies around them, seemed problematic or could be misconstrued. The album was produced by Claudio Sanchez and Zakk Cervini.

== Themes and composition ==
The album is a concept album that furthers the story established in most of the band's prior studio albums, The Amory Wars. It is the second part of a five chapter story arc, described by the band as "a couple on the run from tyrannical forces and their mysterious new addition". Musically, Sanchez noted the band emphasized working without limitations and taking risks rather than "just giving the fans what they want", something he felt veteran bands sometimes fall into later into their careers.

In addition to furthering the story concept, Sanchez has stated that several of the songs were inspired by the COVID-19 pandemic, during which the album was recorded. In particular the songs explore the challenges of living through quarantines and lockdowns ("Comatose", "A Disappearing Act", "Love Murder One", "The Liars Club"). Other songs were inspired by the murder of George Floyd ("Ladders of Supremacy") and Sanchez's relationships with his son ("Blood", "Rise, Naianasha (Cut the Cord)") and wife ("Our Love").

== Release and promotion ==
The album's name, track list, and initial release date of May 27 was first announced in January 2022. In April 2022, the band announced they were delaying the release a month to June 24 due to China's COVID lockdown causing supply chain disruptions, making the vinyl release impossible for the original date. The album is the band's first since Vaxis – Act I: The Unheavenly Creatures in 2018, the band's longest gap of their career. The album's deluxe edition features a 96-page hardcover novel "A Window of the Waking Mind" that ties into the album's concept, written by Sanchez and his wife Chondra Echert. Singles "Shoulders" and "Rise, Naianasha (Cut the Cord)" were released well ahead of the album in 2021, along with accompanying music videos. Further singles "The Liars Club" and "Comatose" were released in 2022 ahead of the album's release. To promote the album, the band went on the headlining "Great Destroyer" tour with Sheer Mag prior to its release, and headlined the A Window of the Waking Mind Tour in summer 2022 alongside Alkaline Trio and Mothica.

"The Liars Club" was featured on the soundtrack of NHL 23.

== Critical reception ==
Professional ratings
Aggregate scores
Source	Rating
Metacritic	81/100
Review scores
Source	Rating
AllMusic	4.5/5 stars
Classic Rock	7/10 stars
Distorted Sound Mag	10/10 stars
FwrdAxis!	5/5 stars
Ghost Cult Magazine	9/10 stars
The Guardian	4/5 stars
Kerrang!	4/5 stars
Metal Injection	8.5/10 stars
Riff Magazine	9/10 stars
Rock Sins	9/10 stars
Sputnikmusic	2/5 stars

Vaxis – Act II: A Window of the Waking Mind was released to critical acclaim from many contemporary music critics.

== Track listing ==
All tracks are written by Claudio Sanchez.

Vaxis – Act II: A Window of the Waking Mind
No.	Title	Length
1.	"The Embers of Fire"	1:35
2.	"Beautiful Losers"	3:35
3.	"Comatose"	3:10
4.	"Shoulders"	3:24
5.	"A Disappearing Act"	3:29
6.	"Love Murder One"	3:25
7.	"Blood"	3:56
8.	"The Liars Club"	3:48
9.	"Bad Man"	3:28
10.	"Our Love"	2:28
11.	"Ladders of Supremacy"	6:48
12.	"Rise, Naianasha (Cut the Cord)"	5:19
13.	"Window of the Waking Mind": I. "Time"; II. "The Awakening"; III. "Birth"; IV. "The Mirroring Eyes"; V. "The Mother"; VI. "The Father"	8:38
Total length:		53:03

== Personnel ==
=== Coheed and Cambria ===
- Claudio Sanchez – vocals, guitar, piano, synthesizer, production
- Travis Stever – guitar
- Josh Eppard – drums
- Zach Cooper – bass

=== Additional musicians ===
- Christopher Jahnke – orchestral arrangements, orchestration
- Atlas Hendrix Sanchez – guest vocals
- Taylor Williams – programming

=== Technical ===
- Zakk Cervini – production, mixing, engineering
- Chris Athens – mastering
- Nik Trekov – engineering, editing, mixing assistance
- Jon Lundin – edit engineering

=== Artwork ===
- Chase Stone

== Charts ==
Chart performance for Vaxis – Act II: A Window of the Waking Mind
Chart (2022)	Peak position
Australian Digital Albums (ARIA)	23
German Albums (Offizielle Top 100)	27
Hungarian Albums (MAHASZ)	7
Scottish Albums (OCC)	16
Swiss Albums (Schweizer Hitparade)	40
UK Albums (OCC)	73
UK Rock & Metal Albums (OCC)	4
US Billboard 200	23
US Top Alternative Albums (Billboard)	2
US Top Hard Rock Albums (Billboard)	1
US Top Rock Albums (Billboard)	3
