= Year of the Black Rainbow =

Studio album by Coheed and Cambria
- Released: April 13, 2010
- Recorded: June – July & November – December 2009
- Genres: Progressive metal; progressive rock
- Length: 53:54
- Labels: Columbia; Roadrunner
- Producers: Atticus Ross; Joe Barresi

Coheed and Cambria chronology
Good Apollo, I'm Burning Star IV, Volume Two: No World for Tomorrow (2007)	Year of the Black Rainbow (2010)	The Afterman: Ascension (2012)

Singles from Year of the Black Rainbow
- 1. "The Broken" Released: February 9, 2010; 2. "Here We Are Juggernaut" Released: March 9, 2010; 3. "World of Lines" Released: August 10, 2010; 4. "Far" Released: April 5, 2011

Year of the Black Rainbow is the fifth studio album by American progressive rock band Coheed and Cambria, released on April 13, 2010 through Columbia. The album is a prequel to the band's previous four concept albums, which comprise the Amory Wars narrative. Year of the Black Rainbow marks drummer Chris Pennie's only studio appearance. It is the last album to feature Michael Todd on bass.

The band began recording the album in 2009. Prior to the release of the album, Coheed released two singles: "The Broken" and "Here We Are Juggernaut". The album received mainly positive reviews and peaked at number 5 on the Billboard 200 and number 35 on the UK Albums Chart. The deluxe version of the album was accompanied by a novel written by the band's vocalist/guitarist Claudio Sanchez and writer Peter David.

== Background and recording ==
The band began recording the album in summer 2009 and finished up later that year in November. Vocalist, guitarist and lyricist Claudio Sanchez noted that the album is very melodic.

The album is produced by Atticus Ross (Nine Inch Nails, Jane's Addiction) and Joe Barresi (Queens of the Stone Age, Tool). According to Sanchez, "they have helped us evolve our sound to be more powerful and dynamic than ever and we think it's definitely our best work to date." Sanchez also states that, "musically, there's a very cinematic tone. There is a lot of atmosphere on this record, and that's something I've always wanted to incorporate on the other records, but just never could attain it as we have on this one." The album has a notably different sound to it than the band's other work. It includes light elements of psychedelic rock, which are not present in the band's other albums.

The album also marked drummer Chris Pennie's studio debut with the band, who had been playing alongside Sanchez, lead guitarist Travis Stever and bassist Michael Todd since 2007. Sanchez stated that: "[Pennie] really kicked ass on this record. There are a lot of tunes on this album that I'm not so sure we would've been able to execute had we not have had him."

Year of the Black Rainbow also completed the main tetralogy of The Amory Wars:

When I created the idea of the Amory Wars and the first record being The Second Stage Turbine Blade and that being the second part of the story, I always knew at the end I would revisit the beginning. I think for those fans that are truly invested in the concept, its [sic] really a necessity. I don't know if it was necessary to make prequels for Star Wars, [but] this is where Coheed and Cambria came from. The origins of who they are.

== Release ==
Year of the Black Rainbow's release was preceded by a series of eight intimate club gigs in the northeastern United States, all of which sold out. The band announced a U.S. tour featuring 36 dates (including the eight in March).

The first song released from the album, "The Broken," premiered at midnight on February 9, 2010. On March 10, 2010, a music video for "The Broken" premiered on Myspace.

The first official single from the album, "Here We Are Juggernaut", was uploaded onto the band's Myspace site on March 4, 2010 and went on sale March 9, 2010. A special vinyl edition of "Guns of Summer" was released exclusively at Vintage Vinyl for Record Store Day.

The album began streaming on the band's MySpace on April 7, 2010. Two weeks later, "Here We Are Juggernaut", "The Broken" and "Guns of Summer" were released as downloadable content for the Rock Band 2 music store. The album was released by Columbia Records in both a standard format and a deluxe edition, which included a 352-page Year of the Black Rainbow novel, penned by the lead singer Claudio Sanchez and New York Times bestselling author Peter David. In Europe the album was released by Roadrunner Records.

Regarding the album's novelization, Sanchez stated that: "It was kind of tough juggling both of them; recording an album and writing a novel. That was a little strenuous but, for the most part, it was a lot of fun."

== Critical reception ==
Professional ratings
Aggregate scores
Source	Rating
Metacritic	71/100
Review scores
Source	Rating
AbsolutePunk	85%
AllMusic	4/5 stars
The A.V. Club	B+
Entertainment Weekly	B+
NME	7/10
PopMatters	7/10
Rolling Stone	2/5 stars
Slant Magazine	1.5/5 stars
Spin	4/10
Sputnikmusic	4/5 stars

The album has received generally positive reviews, garnering a 71/100 on Metacritic from 19 reviews. Rock Sound gave the record a 9 out of 10 and said the album, "is possibly their best record to date." The A.V. Club, who praised the album highly, remarked, "Reconciling its post-hardcore roots with the progressive-rock flourishes that have been eclipsing the band's sound over the past couple albums, tracks like "Here We Are Juggernaut" and "World Of Lines" far outshine the recent output of Coheed’s closest peer, The Mars Volta..." AllMusic, who gave the record a 4 out of 5, concluded that "any fan of heavy progressive rock music may find this music to be of compelling interest, whether one buys into the conceptual nature of the Amory Wars or not." The NewReview rated the album a 4 out of 5 and said "A big portion of the songs on this album are slower in tempo and that makes the listener really analyze the music and appreciate the subtle nuances that this album has to offer." Paul Brannigan of Kerrang! gave the album four stars out of five and called it "a genuine career highpoint for this most idiosyncratic band". Time Out New York gave it a score of four stars out of five and said that "the band wisely refines a winning formula, sounding properly bombastic on 'The Broken,' and effortlessly hooky on 'Here We Are Juggernaut.'" Altsounds gave it 86% and called it "a pretty brilliant album".

Alternative Press gave the album four stars out of five and said it "feels every bit as massive as the world it sets up. It's not just the heaviest record in Coheed's arsenal; it's also one of the strongest." The Boston Globe gave it a favorable review and stated that "The record is further evidence of the quartet's easy chemistry. The band is both bold and geeky, creating a signature sound that typically triggers strong reaction; one man's progressive is another's pretentious." Melodic.net similarly gave the album four stars out of five and said, "Coheed and Cambria always find new ways to bring in their audience and give them all that they have (no pun intended). This is a great album and I think one of their best to date."

However, some reviews are average, mixed or negative: Drowned in Sound gave the album a score of six out of ten and said, "The adventurous nature of Coheed and Cambria was what made them so thrilling. And while this new tangent of popular method could win them a fair few new fans, it may leave some of the loyal wanting more from their next opus." Q gave it three stars out of five and called it "one space saga that's worth presevering with." On the other hand, BBC Music reported that the album "suffers just a little too much from its own grand, sprawling ambition." Billboard gave it a mixed review, stating that the album "lacks the grandiose thematic concepts of previous outings as well as an immediate single, like past songs 'A Favor House Atlantic' or 'The Suffering.'" The Guardian gave it two stars out of five and stated that "Beneath the veneer of baffling musicality, it's evident there's nothing new under the sun, no matter what galaxy you're in."

Slant Magazine lamented, "There's no trace of Coheed's oddball eclecticism here, or of their dynamic pop sensibilities; instead the emotionally and tonally monochrome Black Rainbow gives the impression of a typically humorless metal act." Slant also criticized the album for featuring an "oppressive production job by Atticus Ross and Joe Barressi" that creates "gloomy atmospherics that shroud each and every track". Rolling Stone met the album with lukewarm reception, commenting on "the same old mix of impressive musicianship and arena-size agita," and that "Rainbow feels both silly and retrograde."

== Track listing ==
All lyrics are written by Claudio Sanchez; all music is composed by Coheed and Cambria except "One" and "Pearl of the Stars" by Claudio Sanchez and Atticus Ross.

Year of the Black Rainbow
No.	Title	Length
1.	"One"	1:54
2.	"The Broken"	3:53
3.	"Guns of Summer"	4:47
4.	"Here We Are Juggernaut"	3:44
5.	"Far"	4:53
6.	"This Shattered Symphony"	4:25
7.	"World of Lines"	3:17
8.	"Made Out of Nothing (All That I Am)"	4:39
9.	"Pearl of the Stars"	5:04
10.	"In the Flame of Error"	5:27
11.	"When Skeletons Live"	4:17
12.	"The Black Rainbow"	7:34
Total length:		53:54

Deluxe edition bonus tracks & Japanese edition bonus tracks
No.	Title	Length
13.	"Chamberlain" (demo) (previously unreleased)	4:20
14.	"The Lost Shepherd" (demo) (previously unreleased)	4:11
Total length:		62:27

iTunes edition bonus track
No.	Title	Length
15.	"Hush"	4:18

=== Deluxe edition ===
The deluxe edition includes:

- 352-page Year of the Black Rainbow novel, penned by Claudio Sanchez and author Peter David.
- "Every End Has a Beginning" DVD featuring studio and interview footage.
- Coheed and Cambria "Black Card", available only from the band's official website. Black Card cardholders were eligible for early entrance to selected shows, discounts on band merchandise and exclusive downloads and offers.
- Previously-unreleased bonus tracks

== Personnel ==
The following people contributed to Year of the Black Rainbow:

=== Coheed and Cambria ===
- Claudio Sanchez – lead vocals, guitars, keyboards, synthesizers
- Travis Stever – guitars, lap steel guitar, backing vocals
- Michael Todd – bass guitar
- Chris Pennie – drums, percussion

=== Additional musicians ===
- Wes Styles – additional keyboards
- Brian Dembow – viola ("Pearl of the Stars")
- Claudia Sarne – additional keyboards, orchestration ("Pearl of the Stars")

=== Recording personnel ===
- Atticus Ross – producer, recording, mixing
- Joe Barresi – producer, recording, mixing
- Jun Murakawa – assistant engineer
- Dustin Moseley – additional assistant
- Catherine Marks – mixing assistant ("Here We Are Juggernaut")
- Mike Fasano – drum tech
- Dan Druff – guitar tech
- Brian Gardner – mastering

=== Artwork ===
- Bill Scoville – album art, layout, design

== Charts ==
=== Album ===
The album debuted at number 5 on the Billboard 200, and sold 51,000 copies in its first week. In addition, it was number 2 on the Rock Albums chart and the third most digitally downloaded album. In its second week, Year of the Black Rainbow charted at number 42 on the Billboard 200. The album descended to 73 during its third week on the Billboard 200.

Chart (2010)	Peak position
Australian Albums (ARIA)	38
Canadian Albums (Billboard)	14
German Albums (Offizielle Top 100)	71
Greek Albums (IFPI)	46
UK Albums (Official Charts)	35
US Billboard 200	5
US Top Rock Albums (Billboard)	2

=== Singles ===
Year	Single	Chart	Peak position
2010	"Here We Are Juggernaut"	Alternative Songs	29
