= Chondra Echert =

American writer

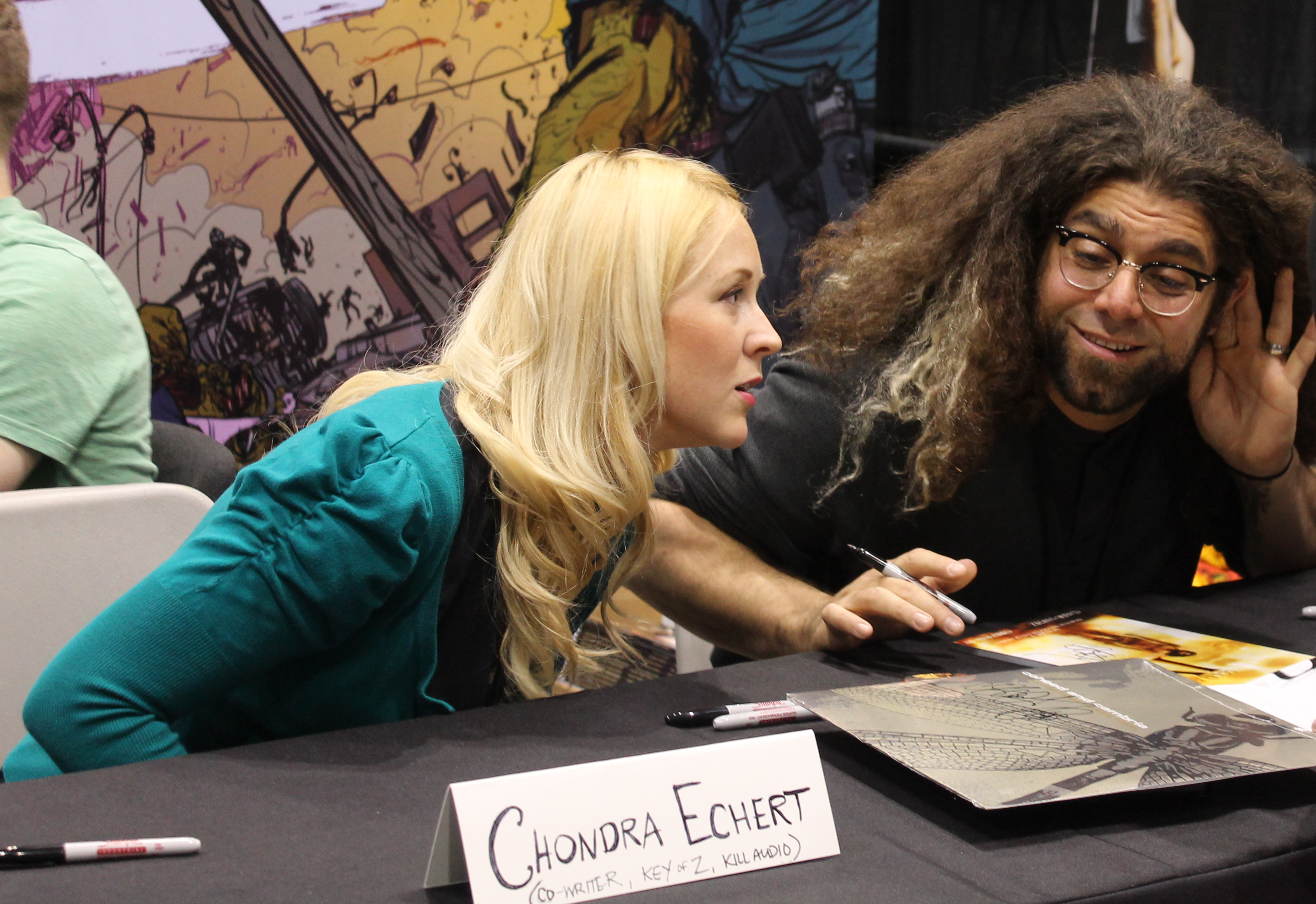
- Echert (left) and her husband Claudio Sanchez, at the 2012 Chicago Comic & Entertainment Expo
- Born: Chondra Marie Echert; April 22, 1983 (age 43); Clearwater, Florida, U.S.
- Spouse: Claudio Sanchez (m. 2009)
- Children: 1

Chondra Echert is an American writer and musician, best known as co-writer of the comic book series Key of Z, Kill Audio and Translucid.

== Early life ==
Chondra Marie Echert was born in Clearwater, Florida on 22 April 1983. She graduated from Eckerd College with a B.S. in Psychology.

== Career ==
After graduating college, Echert relocated to New York, where she began work as an advertising copywriter. Shortly after, Echert pursued a career in comics, after a portion of her first story, Kill Audio, created by and co-written with Claudio Sanchez, was accepted into Image Comics Harvey Award-Nominated, Popgun 2. Illustrated by Sheldon Vella, Kill Audio is a dark comedy which follows a troll's quest to understand his own immortality. Originally previewed in Popgun 2, the story was published as a mini-series through BOOM! Studios and is now available as a trade hardcover. A sequel to the series, Kill Audio 2, is currently in the early stages of production.

In April 2011, Echert began work on Key of Z, a contemporary zombie story set in New York City. This four-part miniseries was her second collaboration with writing partner and husband Claudio Sanchez. Originally titled Subway Seriez, the first issue was released through BOOM! Studios in October 2011, featuring artwork from Aaron Kuder and cover art by Nathan Fox. Key of Z debuted at New York Comic Con 2011 with an incentive baseball cover from original Walking Dead artist Tony Moore. It was collected as a trade paper back in February 2012. The Daily Blam called the book, "a refreshing new addition to the genre and well deserving of all five stars" while Guerrilla Geek said "...this book works on a subtle level of genius."

Recent work includes novellas Vaxis I: The Unheavenly Creatures and Vaxis II: A Window of the Waking Mind, released alongside albums from the band Coheed and Cambria. Echert is currently Creative Co-Director of the independent comic publishing company Evil Ink Comics and co-writer of the New York Times Bestselling science fiction comic series, The Amory Wars.

She is also co-host of Band Wives, a weekly podcast launched in July 2022 with author Misha Lazzara.

== Media appearances ==
Echert appears in Coheed and Cambria's "A Favor House Atlantic" music video as the main love interest, and in the Claudio Sanchez directed video for the song "The Willing Well IV: The Final Cut" from the album Good Apollo, I'm Burning Star IV, Volume One: From Fear Through the Eyes of Madness.

Echert sings backing vocals on Coheed and Cambria's "Gravemakers and Gunslingers" track from the band's album Good Apollo, I'm Burning Star IV, Volume Two: No World For Tomorrow.

A limited edition promotional vinyl record given as a bonus for purchasing a subscription to the Kill Audio series featured two tracks from Claudio Sanchez' The Prize Fighter Inferno side project. Track 1, titled, Erizo Schultz was co-written and performed by Echert, with Sanchez.

Echert and Sanchez relationship was profiled in the New York Times "It's No Secret" section.

Echert also sings backing vocals on the title track of the Half Measures EP by The Prize Fighter Inferno, the track "Mothers of Men" on Coheed and Cambria's album The Afterman: Ascension, and voices the character All Mother on the opening track "The Hollow" and in segues throughout the album.

Echert sings backing vocals on the Let's Start a Band EP with Anthony Green.

Echert appears in Coheed and Cambria's "A Disappearing Act" music video as the main villain, Candelaria.

== Personal life ==
On October 23, 2009, Echert married Claudio Sanchez, frontman of progressive rock band Coheed and Cambria. On June 8, 2014, she gave birth to their first child, Atlas Hendrix Sanchez.

== Bibliography ==
- Kill Audio 0 (with Claudio Sanchez, illustrated by Sheldon Vella, Popgun2 from Image Comics, 2009)
- Kill Audio #1-#6 (with Claudio Sanchez, illustrated by Sheldon Vella, BOOM!Studios, 2009)
- Tiaras and Cold Feet (from Zombie St. Pete, 2010)
- Key of Z #1-#4 (with Claudio Sanchez, illustrated by Aaron Kuder, BOOM!Studios, 2011-2012)
- Translucid #1-#6 (with Claudio Sanchez, illustrated by Daniel Bayliss, "EvilInkComics", 2014)
- The Amory Wars: Good Apollo I'm Burning Star IV (with Claudio Sanchez, illustrated by Rags Morales, BOOM!Studios, 2017]
- Vaxis I: The Unheavenly Creatures [illustrated by Chase Stone, "EvilInkComics", 2019]
- Vaxis II: A Window of the Waking Mind [illustrated by Chase Stone, "EvilInkComics", 2022]
