= Josh Eppard =

American musician (born 1979)

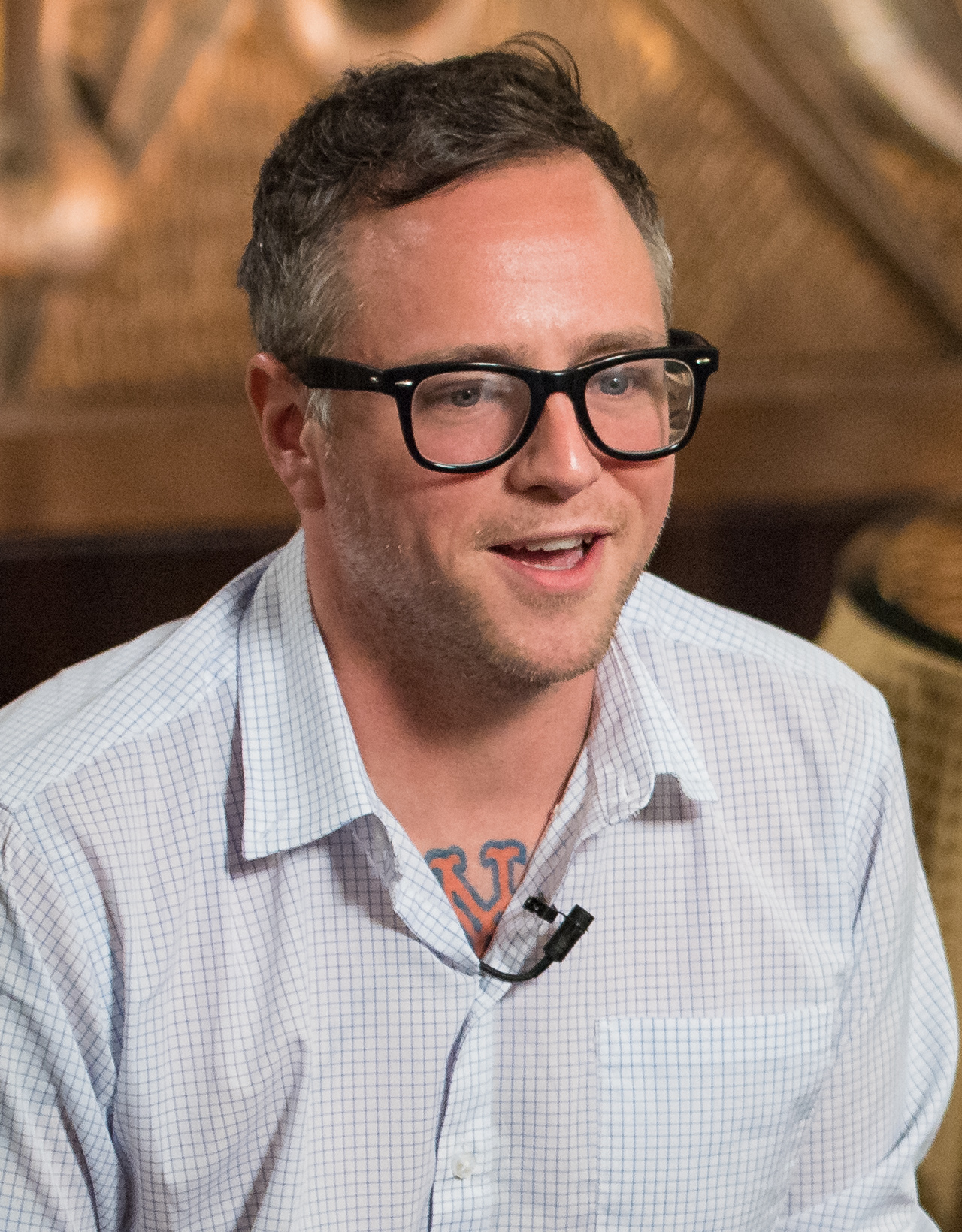
- Josh Eppard in 2018

Background information
- Born: Joshua Eppard; December 6, 1979 (age 46)
- Origin: Kingston, New York, United States
- Genres: Hip hop, rock, alternative rock, progressive rock, new prog
- Occupation: Musician
- Instruments: Drums, percussion, vocals, guitar, keyboards
- Years active: 1993–present
- Labels: Horris, Super Rap, Equal Vision

Josh Eric Eppard (born December 6, 1979) is an American musician from Kingston, New York and the drummer for progressive rock band Coheed and Cambria. He has worked as a solo rapper under the name Weerd Science and was the drummer for supergroup rock band Terrible Things. Josh was a founding member of the Woodstock, NY new prog outfit 3 along with his brother Joey and studio engineer Chris Bittner.

On November 2, 2006 it was announced that Josh would be leaving Coheed and Cambria indefinitely, with Chris Pennie as his replacement. While there was speculation Josh had left the band due to "creative limitations", his split from the band actually resulted from a bout with drug addiction that had been exacerbated by the frantic touring schedule, among other things. Citing an often asked question of him as to whether he quit the band or was fired, Josh's response was that he was likely "about to be fired" before he left.

After leaving Coheed and Cambria, Josh recorded his second Weerd Science album, Sick Kids, at Darkworld Studio in Kingston, NY and Applehead Studios in Woodstock, NY. The album is a creative look into the drug addiction the artist suffered, offering, in addition to a very trying personal account, an insightful social commentary on the current condition of the United States. More recently, he also formed a new rock band, Mours, with friend and collaborator Dave Parker and musician Anthony Masington. In 2026, Eppard joined Douglas Robinson and Sal Mignano of The Sleeping to form the band HELD., whose first album, Grey, was released on May 15, 2026.

In 2009, Josh began drumming in Terrible Things, a band he formed with fellow musicians Fred Mascherino, Andy Jackson, and bassist Steve Lucarelli, who has since left the band. They have been touring and released their debut, Terrible Things on Universal Motown on August 31, 2010. In 2011, Josh signed with Horris Records.

On November 16, 2011, Coheed and Cambria revealed on their website that Josh had officially rejoined the band. On the Terrible Things YouTube channel, Terrible Things vocalist Fred Mascherino announced that Josh had left Terrible Things.

== Discography ==
=== As Weerd Science ===
==== Studio albums ====
- Friends and Nervous Breakdowns (2005)
- Sick Kids (2011)

==== Extended plays ====
- From the Grave (2006, Internet release)
- Red Light Juliet (2013, Internet release)
- Red Light Juliet Broadcast 2: Steady Straight Lights/Sudden Dark Turns (2014, Internet release)
- Red Light Juliet Broadcast 3: The Seer (2015, Internet release)

==== Mixtapes ====
- Unreleased 2000–2004 (2009)
- "Weekend at Dirty's" (2011)

==== Collaborations ====
- Newborn (1999, under the group name Newborn with Bobby Delicious)
- Leader 0ne (2001, under the group name Leader 0ne with Majestic)
- "Bedroom Emcees" (2009, with Mazeman)
- "Everywhere That We Go" (2010, with Rick Whispers)
- "Tech Echoes" (2010, with Mazeman and Ant Mas)
- "How to Be an Indie Rapper" (2011, with MC Lars)

=== With 3 ===
- Paint by Number (1999)

=== With Coheed and Cambria ===
- The Second Stage Turbine Blade (2002)
- In Keeping Secrets of Silent Earth: 3 (2003)
- Good Apollo, I'm Burning Star IV, Volume One: From Fear Through the Eyes of Madness (2005)
- The Afterman: Ascension (2012)
- The Afterman: Descension (2013)
- The Color Before the Sun (2015)
- Vaxis – Act I: The Unheavenly Creatures (2018)
- Vaxis – Act II: A Window of the Waking Mind (2022)
- Vaxis – Act III: The Father of Make Believe (2025)

=== With Fire Deuce ===
- Children of the Deuce – Drums, as Deuce Newton

=== With Terrible Things ===
- Terrible Things (2010)

=== With HELD. ===
- Grey (2026)

== Drumming ==
Eppard plays the drum set in the open-handed style. He uses a single bass drum pedal, which he insists gives a better groove.

=== Gear ===
Drums:

Tama Drums

- Starclassic Performer B/B
- Shell Color: Champagne Sparkle (CHS)
- 16"x22" Bass Drum
- 8"x12" Tom Tom
- 16"x16" Floor Tom
- 5.5"x14" SLP Dynamic Bronze Snare (LBZ1455)
- 5.5"x14" Vintage Poplar Maple Snare (LMPM1455FNFM)

Hardware

- Iron Cobra Power Glide Single Pedal (HP900PN)
- Iron Cobra Lever Glide HH Stand (HH905N)
- Roadpro Cymbal & Snare Stands (HC83BW & HS800W)
- STAR Single Tom Stand (HTS108W)
- 1st Chair Ergo-Rider Throne (HT730B)

Cymbals (Sabian)

Josh stated in a 2017 interview that he usually picks cymbals that he feels "fit the live set list". He also stated that he "like[s] to go between a Sabian 20″ HHX Stage ride, a 20″ HHX Stage crash, 14″ hi-hats, and a 18″ to 20″ China. I love the 19″ Paragon and the 18″ AAX China.".

Sticks

- Pro Mark Natural 5B (wood tip) with Pro Mark blue stick rapp

Heads

- Snare Evans Hybrid Coated Batter Head 14 in.
- Toms Evans EC2S Clear Batter Drumheads 12 in and 16 in
- Bass EMAD Clear 22 in, Custom Tama Reso Head

Microphones (Live)

- Shure SM57 (Snare)
- Sennheiser 604 (Toms)
- Shure 52 and 91 (Bass)
- Neumann KM184 (Overheads)

Previous Used Set up:

C&C Custom Drums

- Red Sparkle Kit
- 6.5" x 14" Snare
- 8" x 10" Rack Tom (sometimes a 9" x 12" Rack Tom)
- 15" x 15" floor Tom
- 18" x 22" Bass Drum

Hardware

- All DW 9000 series Boom Stands, Hi-Hat Stands, Tom Stands, Pedals and Throne.

Cymbals (Sabian)

- 13" AA Hi-Hats
- 18" AA Chinese
- 8" AA Splash
- 21" AA Raw Bell Dry Ride (used as crash)
- 21" AA Rock Ride

In earlier days, Josh has used Zildjian, Paiste and a number of other cymbal brands.

Heads

- Snare (Remo Coated Emperor)
- Toms (Pinstripes on tops, and Clear Ambassadors on bottoms)
- Bass (Remo Powerstroke 3 with C&C Custom Logo Head on front)
