= The Afterman: Ascension =

Studio album by Coheed and Cambria
- Released: October 9, 2012
- Recorded: November 2011 – June 2012 Applehead Recording Woodstock, NY
- Genre: Progressive metal; progressive rock
- Length: 39:29
- Label: Hundred Handed/Everything Evil
- Producer: Coheed and Cambria; Michael Birnbaum; Chris Bittner

Coheed and Cambria chronology
Year of the Black Rainbow (2010)	The Afterman: Ascension (2012)	The Afterman: Descension (2013)

Singles from The Afterman: Ascension
- 1. "Key Entity Extraction I: Domino the Destitute" Released: August 28, 2012; 2. "The Afterman" Released: November 16, 2012

The Afterman: Ascension is the sixth studio album by American progressive rock band Coheed and Cambria. It is the first part of a double album, the second part of which is The Afterman: Descension. The band took seven months to record the albums between 2011 and 2012, released a live acoustic version of "Key Entity Extraction V: Sentry the Defiant" (which appears on The Afterman: Descension) in February 2012, and announced a release date of October 9 later that year. The first single was "Key Entity Extraction I: Domino the Destitute", released in August 2012. It is the first Coheed and Cambria album since 2005's Good Apollo, I'm Burning Star IV, Volume One: From Fear Through the Eyes of Madness to feature Josh Eppard on drums, and the first to feature Zach Cooper on bass. The album received mainly positive reviews.

The deluxe version of the album was released with a coffee-table book written by band member Claudio Sanchez and edited by Evil Ink Comics' Chondra Echert and Blaze James, intended to give a song-by-song experience of the concept album. The album is a prequel to the Amory Wars storyline, and concentrates on the character Sirius Amory.

== Background and recording ==
Coheed and Cambria began recording the double album in November 2011, and had finished recording by June 2012. It is the first Coheed and Cambria album featuring Zach Cooper on bass, and the first to feature Josh Eppard on drums since Good Apollo, I'm Burning Star IV, Volume One: From Fear Through the Eyes of Madness released in 2005.

In February, 2012, Coheed and Cambria singer/guitarist Claudio Sanchez released a self-shot acoustic rendition of a new song titled "Key Entity Extraction V: Sentry the Defiant" via the band's official YouTube channel. The song later turned out to be on the second album, The Afterman: Descension.

On August 7, 2012, Rolling Stone revealed that the first single and music video from the album would be "Key Entity Extraction I: Domino the Destitute". Later the same day they played the song for the first time as part of their set in Tucson, Arizona. The single was released digitally on August 28, along with a music video. Two weeks before the album's release, the band premiered the studio version of the title track "The Afterman" on Rolling Stone.

The band released a music video for "The Afterman" on November 16.

== Release ==
The album was released in both digital and physical formats on October 9, 2012; the second part was released on February 5, 2013. The album name and release date were announced on July 31, 2012 via a press release and a YouTube teaser video, featuring a man in a spaceship he refers to as "All Mother". Coheed and Cambria co-produced the album with Michael Birnbaum and Chris Bittner under the label Hundred Handed/Everything Evil and will be distributed by Fontana/INgrooves.

The deluxe version of the album was released with a hardcover coffee-table book of the album's Amory Wars storyline, the concept all Coheed and Cambria's albums follow (with the exception of 2015's The Color Before the Sun). The book is written by Sanchez. The double album tells the story of Sirius Amory, the namesake of the concept, as he explores the energy source holding together the Keywork (the 78 worlds in which the Amory Wars is set) and finds that it is in fact a horrible afterlife for departed souls. The artwork for the book was created by Heidi Taillefer and Nathan Spoor, and the book provides a "song-by-song" experience for the listener.

== Critical reception ==
Professional ratings
Aggregate scores
Source	Rating
Metacritic	74/100
Review scores
Source	Rating
Allmusic	3.5/5 stars
Artist Direct	5/5 stars
The A.V. Club	B
Consequence of Sound	3/5 stars
Kerrang!	4/5 stars
Mojo	3/5 stars
Popmatters	8/10
Q	6/10
Rock Sound	8/10
Sputnikmusic	3.5/5

The album has received mainly positive reviews, gaining 74/100 on Metacritic from twelve reviews. Artist Direct singled out the album as the band's "best album to date". Allmusic criticized the album for being "a bit of a mess" due to the scale of its ambition, though it acknowledged that this could be forgiven as there is "so much here that works". Both The A.V. Club and Sputnikmusic rated the album as a step forward for the band.

== Track listing ==
All songs written by Claudio Sanchez and arranged by Coheed and Cambria. Segues written and arranged by Claudio Sanchez and Josh Eppard.

The Afterman: Ascension
No.	Title	Length
1.	"The Hollow"	2:11
2.	"Key Entity Extraction I: Domino the Destitute"	7:51
3.	"The Afterman"	3:11
4.	"Mothers of Men"	4:11
5.	"Goodnight, Fair Lady"	3:23
6.	"Key Entity Extraction II: Holly Wood the Cracked"	3:26
7.	"Key Entity Extraction III: Vic the Butcher"	5:47
8.	"Key Entity Extraction IV: Evagria the Faithful"	6:22
9.	"Subtraction"	3:07
Total length:		39:29

iTunes Edition Tracks
No.	Title	Length
10.	"The Homecoming" (bonus track)	3:57
11.	"Goodnight, Fair Lady" (demo)	3:07
12.	"The Afterman" (demo)	3:11
Total length:		49:44

Limited Deluxe Edition Box Set: Disc 2 (Big Beige demos)
No.	Title	Length
1.	"Domino the Destitute" (demo)	7:59
2.	"The Afterman" (demo)	3:11
3.	"Mothers of Men" (demo)	4:04
4.	"Goodnight, Fair Lady" (demo)	3:08
5.	"Holly Wood the Cracked" (demo)	3:01
6.	"Vic the Butcher" (demo)	5:39
7.	"Evagria the Faithful" (demo)	5:39
8.	"Subtraction" (demo)	2:55
9.	"The Homecoming" (bonus track)	3:58
Total length:		39:34

== Personnel ==
Coheed and Cambria

- Claudio Sanchez – lead vocals, guitars, electric piano, voice of Sirius Amory
- Travis Stever – guitars, lap steel guitar, backing vocals
- Zach Cooper – bass guitar, backing vocals
- Josh Eppard – drums, percussion, keyboards, backing vocals

Additional musicians

- John Medeski – piano, clavinet, synthesizers
- Daniel Sedownick – percussion
- Karl Berger – orchestration
- Julianne Klopotic and Chern Hwei Fung – violin
- Nicole Federici – viola
- Tomas Ulrich – cello
- Chondra Sanchez – additional background vocals, voice of The All Mother
- Madeline Birnbaum – additional background vocals

Production

- Coheed and Cambria, Michael Birnbaum and Chris Bittner – production
- Rob Gill and Jeff Champtone – guitar techs
- Rich Costey – mixing on "Key Entity Extraction I: Domino the Destitute" and "Mothers of Men" at Eldorado Studios, Burbank, CA (assisted by Chris Kasych)
- Ryan Williams – mixing on "The Afterman", "Goodnight, Fair Lady", "Key Entity Extraction II: Holly Wood the Cracked", "Key Entity Extraction III: Vic the Butcher", "Key Entity Extraction IV: Evagria the Faithful" and "Subtraction" at Pulse Recording, Silver Lake, CA
- Howie Weinberg and Dan Gerbarg – mastering at Howie Weinberg Mastering

Artwork

- Heidi Taillefer – cover art
- Nathan Spoor – interior art
- Bill Scoville – package design and additional graphics

Management

- Peter Lewit and David Rappaport (Davis, Shapiro, Lewit and Hayes) – legal representation
- David Weise, Kathy Izaguirre, Beth Sabbagh and Tagui Karagaryan (David Weise and Associates) – business management
- Kirk M. Sommer, (William Morris Endeavor) – North America booking
- Rob Markus (William Morris Endeavor) – Mexico and Puerto Rico booking
- Steve Strange (X-Ray Touring) – booking (rest of world) (assisted by Josh Javor)
- Pete Stahl – tour production guru
- Blaze James (Velvet Hammer Music and Management Group) – navigator

== Charts ==
The Afterman: Ascension debuted at number 5 on the Billboard 200 on October 17, 2012. It also reached number 11 on the Canadian Albums Chart and number 5 on the UK Rock Albums Chart.

Chart (2012)	Peak position
Billboard 200	5
Canadian Albums Chart	11
UK Rock Albums Chart	5
