= The Second Stage Turbine Blade =

Studio album by Coheed and Cambria
- Released: March 5, 2002
- Recorded: October – November 2001
- Studio: Stainglass Studio in Paramus, New Jersey
- Genres: Post-hardcore; pop-punk; alternative metal; emo; progressive rock
- Length: 48:44
- Labels: Equal Vision; Defiance
- Producers: Michael Birnbaum; Chris Bittner

Coheed and Cambria chronology
Delirium Trigger (2000)	The Second Stage Turbine Blade (2002)	In Keeping Secrets of Silent Earth: 3 (2003)

Singles from The Second Stage Turbine Blade
- 1. "Devil in Jersey City" Released: 2004

The Second Stage Turbine Blade is the debut studio album by American progressive rock band Coheed and Cambria. It was originally released on March 5, 2002 through Equal Vision Records. It is their first album and part one of a tetralogy, telling the story of The Amory Wars. It was re-released on September 20, 2005, and included three previously unreleased bonus tracks.

Professional ratings
Review scores
Source	Rating
Allmusic	3.5/5 stars
antiMusic	5/5 stars
Melodic.net	2.5/5 stars
Sputnikmusic	(2006) (2011)

== Story ==
The album introduces the husband and wife characters Coheed and Cambria, the characters from whom the band's name originates.

== Track listing ==
All lyrics are written by Claudio Sanchez; all music is composed by Coheed and Cambria.

The Second Stage Turbine Blade
No.	Title	Length
1.	"Second Stage Turbine Blade"	0:53
2.	"Time Consumer"	5:50
3.	"Devil in Jersey City"	4:50
4.	"Everything Evil"	5:53
5.	"Delirium Trigger"	4:48
6.	"Hearshot Kid Disaster"	5:44
7.	"33"	3:30
8.	"Junesong Provision"	5:21
9.	"Neverender"	5:23
10.	"God Send Conspirator"	6:36
Total length:		48:44

Re-release bonus tracks
No.	Title	Length
11.	"Elf Tower New Mexico"	6:07
12.	"Junesong Provision" (acoustic demo)	5:47
13.	"Everything Evil" (demo)	13:37

Note: On the standard ten-track edition, the hidden track "IRO-Bot" is contained in "God Send Conspirator"; however, on the deluxe edition, it is contained in the "Everything Evil" demo.

== Personnel ==
Coheed and Cambria

- Claudio Sanchez – lead vocals, rhythm guitar
- Travis Stever – lead guitar
- Michael Todd – bass guitar, vocals
- Josh Eppard – drums, piano

Additional

- Michael Birnbaum – production, mixing
- Chris Bittner – production, mixing
- Jayson Dezuzio – recording, pre-production
- Roger Lian – mastering
- Nate Kelley – drums (on "Delirium Trigger" and "33")
- Dr. Know – guitar (on "Time Consumer")
- Todd Martin – recording (on "Delirium Trigger" and "33")
- Montana Masback – additional vocals (on "Hearshot Kid Disaster")

== Tie-in comics ==
In the summer of 2004, Evil Ink Comics released a series of ten comic books as a tie-in to the album. Written by Claudio Sanchez and illustrated by Wes Abbot, the comics tell the story of Coheed and Cambria Kilgannon, a married couple who become unwittingly involved in interplanetary intrigue.
