= Claudio Sanchez =

American writer and musician

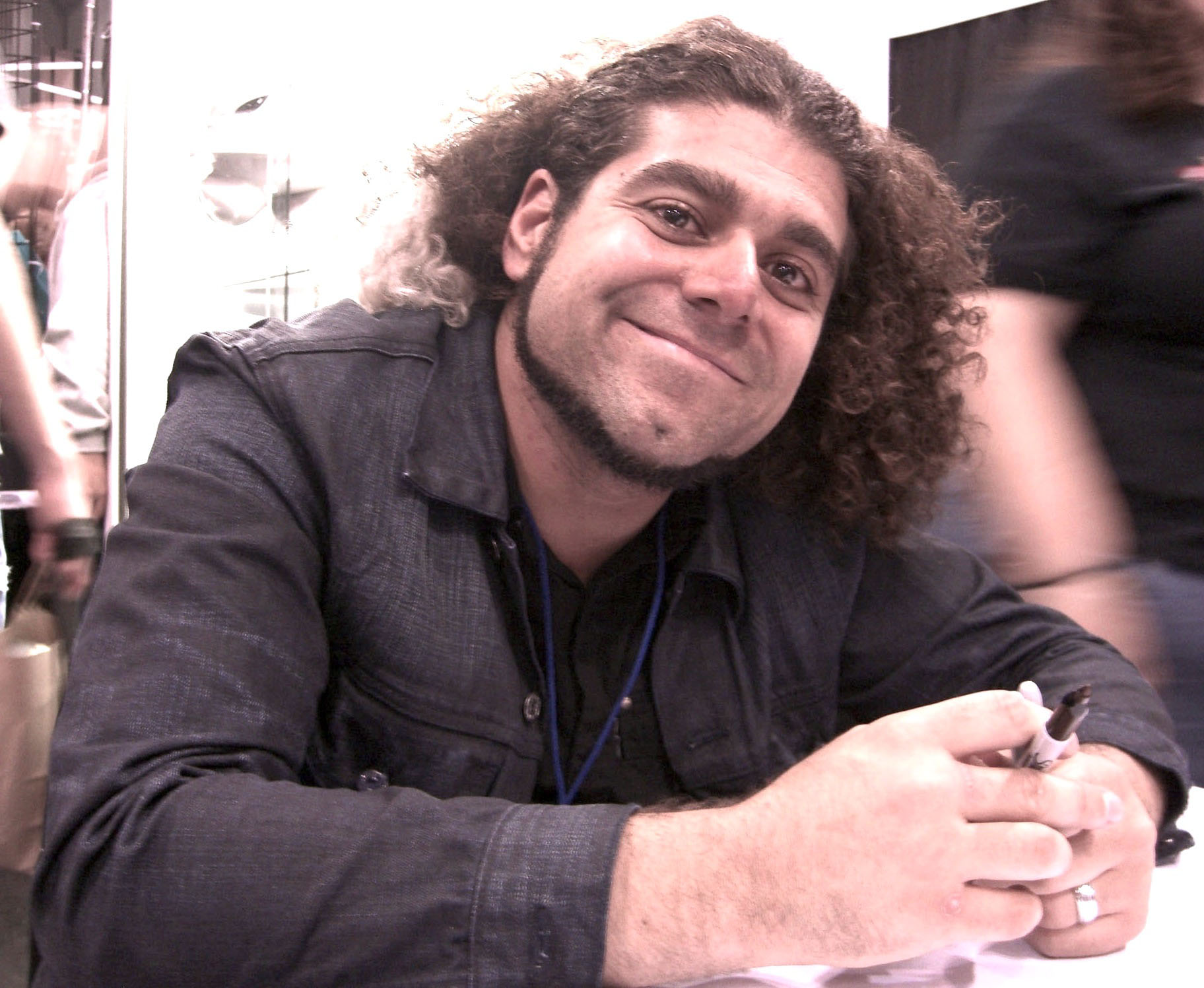
- Sanchez in 2010

Background information
- Born: Claudio Paul Sanchez III; March 12, 1978 (age 48); Suffern, New York, United States
- Origin: Nyack, New York, U.S.
- Genres: Alternative rock; progressive rock; progressive metal; new prog; electronica; alternative metal; post-hardcore
- Occupations: Musician; multi-instrumentalist; writer
- Instruments: Vocals; guitar; keyboards; synthesizers; harmonica; piano; ukulele; theremin
- Years active: 1995–present
- Labels: Columbia; Sony BMG; Equal Vision; Hundred Handed; Everything Evil
- Spouse: Chondra Echert (m. 2009)
- Website: coheedandcambria.com

Claudio Paul Sanchez III (born March 12, 1978) is an American musician and writer best known for being the lead singer, guitarist and primary lyricist for the progressive rock band Coheed and Cambria. He is the creator of the comic book series The Amory Wars, as well as Key of Z and Kill Audio, both co-written with his wife Chondra Echert. Sanchez co-authored the novel Year of the Black Rainbow with Peter David.

== Musical career ==
Sanchez primarily provides lead vocals and guitar in Coheed and Cambria. However, he has also used theremins, synthesizers, and harmonicas in his side projects. Early in his career, Sanchez first performed with several different bands, all of which lasted a short period of time.

After departing from the band Beautiful Loser after a dispute over gas money, Sanchez went on a trip to Paris with his then-girlfriend (who was studying abroad), where he began writing a story, initially referred to as The Bag.On.Line Adventures of Coheed and Cambria, named after The Bag On Line, a handbag store near where Sanchez stayed while in Paris. Two characters named Coheed and Cambria Kilgannon live in a fictional foreign galaxy known as Heaven's Fence. In the original concept, Sanchez wrote a story about his girlfriend and himself traveling to a new, foreign place, but as the concept expanded, the characters started to resemble his parents.

Sanchez was the lead singer and guitarist for Shabütie, which formed in Nyack, New York, in 1995. Shabutie released several EPs and wrote several songs which would eventually be released on The Second Stage Turbine Blade. The band broke up after Nate Kelley walked out on a performance but was later reformed with Josh Eppard (formerly from the band 3 with his brother Joey), replacing Nate Kelley on drums. This new band was dubbed Coheed and Cambria, named after the characters Sanchez had written about in Paris. Coheed and Cambria achieved success on the East Coast after releasing and touring The Second Stage Turbine Blade, and they gained mainstream success with the release of In Keeping Secrets of Silent Earth: 3 thanks to the single "A Favor House Atlantic".

== Comics ==
Sanchez began producing comic books in 2000, beginning with The Bag.On.Line Adventures. The Bag.On.Line Adventures lasted two issues due to problems with the artist, deadlines, and financial issues. Sanchez's next project was the graphic novel Good Apollo, I'm Burning Star IV, Volume One: From Fear Through the Eyes of Madness. The graphic novel was released alongside the album of the same name, however, Sanchez has stated that the novel was incomplete due to financial issues.

Sanchez began anew in 2008, with the series The Amory Wars, which chronicles events album by album. The Second Stage Turbine Blade was covered in two five-part comic book limited series. Alongside Peter David, Sanchez co-wrote the novel The Amory Wars: Year of the Black Rainbow, chronicling the events of the Year of the Black Rainbow album. Sanchez also released a twelve-issue comic book series adapting In Keeping Secrets of Silent Earth: 3 under the Amory Wars name. A forthcoming adaptation of the Good Apollo 1 storyline was foreshadowed at the end of the twelfth issue.

Under the Evil Ink Comics label, he has also produced Kill Audio (2009), Key of Z (2011), and Translucid (2014) with Chondra Echert.

== Other work ==
Sanchez also performs in a side project called The Prize Fighter Inferno. The band is a concept band based on the character Jesse, a boxer known as the Prize Fighter Inferno. The story focuses on The Blood Machine, a vicious contraption that murders its victims and takes their souls. Sanchez also released a two-song 7" vinyl album titled The Beaver Records EP, which is associated with Kill Audio and The Prize Fighter Inferno.

On September 8, 2012, Sanchez released a six-song non-conceptual EP, Half Measures, under his side project The Prize Fighter Inferno.

On April 23, 2021, Sanchez released a new full-length album under The Prize Fighter Inferno titled The City Introvert.

On December 20, 2024, Sanchez released an album of cover songs titled Claudio Covers.

Claudio Covers
No.	Title	Original artist	Length
1.	"Just Like Heaven"	The Cure	3:14
2.	"Welcome to New York"	Taylor Swift	4:08
3.	"Your Love"	The Outfield	4:51
4.	"Pompeii"	Bastille	3:56
5.	"Under the Milky Way"	The Church	4:39
6.	"Stumbleine"	The Smashing Pumpkins	2:44
7.	"Sister Christian"	Night Ranger	2:46
8.	"There Is a Light That Never Goes Out"	The Smiths	3:48
Total length:			30:08

On November 18, 2026, Sanchez released a single, "Burnout". It is the first solo music released under his own name.

== Personal life ==
Sanchez is of Puerto Rican and Italian descent.

As a teenager, he would discover his father's recessive heroin addiction, but stated that he always kept himself as close to his family as possible despite his struggles. Claudio has stated in interviews that The Second Stage Turbine Blade was named after the part his father made for aircraft in his factory job, and that the dragonfly symbol throughout their work was inspired by the needles his father would use for his heroin.

On October 23, 2009, Sanchez married Chondra Echert. On June 8, 2014, Echert gave birth to their first child, Atlas Hendrix Sanchez.
