= MNRK Music Group discography =

The MNRK Music Group discography has produced more Billboard hits than any other independent record label. MNRK Music Group was known as Koch Records from its founding in 1987 until 2009 and eOne Music from 2009 to 2021. In its early years, the record label signed many country, classical and rock acts, including artists Ringo Starr, Joan Baez, Chris Brubeck and Bob James. In the early 2000s, the label began to sign more hip hop acts and made deals with hip hop labels, releasing records by 2Pac, Tha Dogg Pound, Kurupt, Daz Dillinger and Gangsta Advisory. MNRK Music has had over 100 albums chart on the Billboard Independent chart and is the largest independently owned record label in the United States.

== 1990s ==
=== 1999 ===
- Mephiskapheles – Might-ay White-ay (Koch)

== 2000s ==
=== 2000 ===
- Flesh-N-Bone – 5th Dog Let Loose (Mo Thugs/Koch/In The Paint)
- Slash's Snakepit – Ain't Life Grand (Koch)
- Cradle of Filth – Midian (Music for Nations/Koch)
- Mo Thugs Family – III: The Mothership (Mo Thugs/Koch/In The Paint)

=== 2001 ===
- KRS-One – The Sneak Attack (Koch)
- Opeth – Blackwater Park (Music for Nations/Koch)
- Stabbing Westward – Stabbing Westward (Koch)
- Confederate Railroad – Unleashed (Koch)

=== 2002 ===
- KRS-One – Spiritual Minded (Koch)
- Opeth – Deliverance (Music for Nations/Koch)
- Public Enemy – Revolverlution (Koch)
- Royce da 5'9" – Rock City (Game/Columbia/Koch)
- Wu-Tang Clan & Wu-Tang Killa Beez – The Sting (Wu Music Group/Koch)

=== 2003 ===
- B.G. – Livin' Legend (Chopper City/In The Paint/Koch)
- Iconz – Ya Lookin' At 'Em (In The Paint/Koch)
- KRS-One – Kristyles (Koch)
- Montell Jordan – Life After Def (Enterprise/Koch)
- Opeth – Damnation (Music for Nations/Koch)
- Some Girls – Feel It (Koch)
- Soulja Slim – Years Later...A Few Months After (Cut Throat Comitty/In The Paint/Koch)
- The Bangles – Doll Revolution (Koch)
- Turk – Raw & Uncut (Laboratory/In The Paint/Koch)

=== 2004 ===
- Master P – Good Side, Bad Side (The New No Limit/Koch)
- Goodie Mob – One Monkey Don't Stop No Show (Koch)
- Silkk The Shocker – Based on a True Story (The New No Limit/Koch)
- Jim Jones – On My Way to Church (Diplomat/Koch)
- The Diplomats – Diplomatic Immunity 2 (Diplomat/Koch)
- Lil Romeo – Romeoland (The New No Limit/Koch)
- Melissa Manchester – When I Look Down That Road (Koch)
- The Alchemist – 1st Infantry (All City/Koch)
- Royce da 5'9" – Death Is Certain (Koch)
- Tony Touch – The Piece Maker 2 (Koch)
- Turk – Penitentiary Chances (Laboratory/Koch)
- Cormega – Legal Hustle (Legal Hustle/Koch)
- B.G. – Life After Cash Money (Chopper City/Koch)
- Restless Heart – Still Restless (Audium/Koch)
- Lil Romeo – Romeo TV Show OST (The New No Limit/Koch)

=== 2005 ===
- C-Murder – The Truest Shit I Ever Said (TRU/Koch)
- Master P – Ghetto Bill (The New No Limit//Koch)
- Little Big Town – The Road to Here (Equity/Koch)
- TRU – The Truth (The New No Limit/Koch)
- Jerry Douglas – The Best Kept Secret (Koch)
- Jim Jones – Harlem: Diary of a Summer (Diplomat/Koch)
- Kurupt – Against the Grain (Death Row/Koch)
- Marcus Miller – Silver Rain (Koch)
- B.G. – The Heart of tha Streetz, Vol. 1 (Chopper City/Koch)
- Funkmaster Flex – Car Show Tour (Koch)

=== 2006 ===
- J.R. Writer – History in the Making (Diplomat/Koch)
- Master P – The Ultimate Master P (Koch)
- Some Girls – Crushing Love (Koch)
- Tha Dogg Pound – Cali Iz Active (Doggystyle/Koch)
- DJ Unk – Beat'n Down Yo Block! (Big Oomp/Koch)
- Xzibit – Full Circle (Open Bar/Sony Music/Koch)
- Jim Jones – Hustler's P.O.M.E. (Product of My Environment) (Diplomat/Koch)
- B.G. – The Heart of tha Streetz, Vol. 2 (I Am What I Am) (Chopper City/Ca$hville/Koch)
- DJ Khaled – Listennn... the Album (Terror Squad/Koch)
- Dwele – Sketches of a Man (Koch)
- Akir – Legacy (Viper/Koch)
- Bone Thugs-N-Harmony – Thug Stories (Koch)
- The Diplomats – A Dipset X-Mas (Diplomat/Koch)
- DJ Kay Slay & Greg Street – The Champions: North Meets South (Koch)

=== 2007 ===
- Freekey Zekey – Book of Ezekiel (Diplomat/Asylum/Koch/Atlantic)
- Hell Rell – For the Hell of It (Diplomat/Koch)
- 40 Cal. – Broken Safety 2 (Diplomat/Koch)
- Jim Jones – Harlem's American Gangster (Diplomat/Koch)
- Horse the Band – A Natural Death (Koch)
- Lil' Mo – Pain & Paper (Honeychild/Koch)
- Necro – Death Rap (Psycho+Logical/Koch)
- Otep – The Ascension (Capitol/Koch)
- Prodigy – Return of the Mac (Koch)
- Joell Ortiz – The Brick: Bodega Chronicles (Koch)
- Project Pat – Walkin' Bank Roll (Hypnotize Minds/Koch)
- Tha Dogg Pound – Dogg Chit (Gangsta Advisory/Koch)
- Bizarre – Blue Cheese & Coney Island (Koch)
- DJ Encore – Unique (Koch)
- DJ Khaled – We the Best (Terror Squad/Koch)
- Sean Kingston – Sean Kingston (Beluga Heights/Epic/Koch)
- Boss Hogg Outlawz – Serve & Collect (Boss Hogg/Koch)
- Styles P – Super Gangster (Extraordinary Gentleman) (Ruff Ryders/Koch)
- KRS-One & Marley Marl – Hip Hop Lives (Koch)
- Tupac Shakur – Nu-Mixx Klazzics Vol. 2 (Amaru/Koch)
- Daz Dillinger – Gangsta Party (Gangsta Advisory/Koch)

=== 2008 ===
- Big Moe – Unfinished Business (Wreckshop/Koch)
- In Flames – A Sense of Purpose (Koch)
- The Myriad – With Arrows, With Poise (Koch)
- Ray J – All I Feel (Knockout/Deja34/Epic/Koch)
- Baby D – A-Town Secret Weapon (Big Oomp/Epic/Koch)
- RZA – Digi Snacks (Wu Music Group/Koch)
- Sabac – The Ritual (Psycho+Logical/Koch)
- Big Noyd – Illustrious (Noyd Inc/Koch)
- Sheek Louch – Silverback Gorilla (D-Block/Koch)
- Trick-Trick – The Villain (Koch)
- DJ Unk – 2econd Season (Big Oomp/Koch)
- Dubb Union – Snoop Dogg Presents: Dubb Union (Doggystyle/Koch)
- AZ – Undeniable (Koch)
- Yung Berg – Look What You Made Me (Yung Boss/Epic/Koch)
- DJ Khaled – We Global (Terror Squad/We the Best/Koch)
- Anew Revolution – Rise (Koch)
- Jerry Douglas – Glide (Koch)
- Jim Jones & Skull Gang – A Tribute to Bad Santa Starring Mike Epps (Splash/Koch)
- Boss Hogg Outlawz – Back by Blockular Demand: Serve & Collect II (Boss Hogg/Koch)
- Dem Franchize Boyz – Our World, Our Way (Koch)
- Re-Up Gang – Clipse Presents: Re-Up Gang (Re-Up/Koch)
- The Alchemist – The Alchemist's Cookbook (ALC/Koch)
- Keak da Sneak – Deified (Koch)
- KRS-One – Maximum Strength (Koch)

=== 2009 ===
- Dope – No Regrets (Koch)
- Warren G – The G Files (TTL/Koch)
- KRS-One & Buckshot – Survival Skills (Koch)
- Jim Jones – Pray IV Reign (Columbia/Koch)
- Hatebreed – For the Lions (Koch)
- Dorrough – Dorrough Music (Koch)
- Blackhole – Dead Hearts (Koch)
- Havoc – Hidden Files (Koch)
- Hatebreed – Hatebreed (Koch)
- Webstar & Jim Jones – The Rooftop (Scrilla Hill/Splash/Koch)
- Sean Kingston – Tomorrow (Beluga Heights/Epic/Koch)
- Dirge Within – Force Fed Lies (Koch)
- Basia – It's That Girl Again (Koch)
- Avalon – Reborn (Koch)
- Kittie – In the Black (E1)
- M.O.P. – Foundation (Koch)
- Joell Ortiz – Free Agent (Koch)
- Sha Stimuli – My Soul To Keep (Koch)
- Slaughterhouse – Slaughterhouse (Koch)
- Slim Thug – Boss of All Bosses (Boss Hogg/Koch)
- Tha Realest – Witness Tha Realest (Team Dime/RBC/Koch)
- Throwdown – Deathless (Koch)
- Wu-Tang Clan – Wu-Tang Chamber Music (Wu Music Group/Universal/Koch)
- Brian McKnight – Evolution of a Man (Hard Work/Koch)
- Foxy Brown – Brooklyn's Don Diva (Black Rose/Koch)
- B.G. – Too Hood 2 Be Hollywood (Chopper City/Atlantic/Koch)
- E.S.G. – Everyday Street Gangsta (Koch)
- Juvenile – Cocky and Confident (Atlantic/UTP/Koch)
- D-Block – No Security (D-Block/Koch)
- Arkaea – Years in the Darkness (Century Media/Koch)
- DJ Khaled & E-Class – Present Live From The 305 (Poe Boy/Atlantic/Koch)
- Jerry Douglas – Jerry Christmas (Koch)
- K.A.R. – Joe Crack & Pistol Pete Present: K.A.R. (Kill All Rats/Koch)
- Skull Gang – Skull Gang (Skull Gang/Koch)
- Mike Epps – Funny Bidness: Da Album (Koch)
- The Alchemist – Chemical Warfare (ALC/Koch)
- Béla Fleck – The Melody of Rhythm (Koch)

== 2010s ==
=== 2010 ===
- Time for Three (Tf3) – 3 Fervent Travelers (eOne)
- DJ Khaled – Victory (Terror Squad/We the Best/eOne)
- Faith Evans – Something About Faith (Prolific/eOne)
- Necro – Death Rap (Psycho+Logical/eOne)
- Dorrough – Get Big (eOne)
- Cassidy – Face 2 Face EP (Krossover/Larsiny/eOne)
- Fat Joe – The Darkside Vol. 1 (Terror Squad/Koch)
- DJ Funkmaster Flex – Car Show Tour (eOne)
- High on Fire – Snakes for the Divine (eOne)
- Juvenile – Beast Mode (UTP/eOne)
- Necro – Death Rap (Psycho+Logical/eOne)
- Powerglove – Saturday Morning Apocalypse (eOne)
- Donell Jones – Lyrics (Candyman/eOne)
- Slim Thug – Tha Thug Show (Boss Hogg/eOne)
- Zoroaster – Matador (eOne)
- Black Label Society – Order of the Black (eOne)
- Dwele – W.ants W.orld W.omen (eOne)
- Cassidy – C.A.S.H. (Krossover/Larsiny/eOne)
- Devin the Dude – Suite 420 (eOne)
- The 5 Browns – The 5 Browns in Hollywood (eOne)
- Anew Revolution – Imerica (eOne)
- Vivian Green – Beautiful (eOne)
- David Banner & 9th Wonder – Death of a Popstar (Big Face/IWWMG/eOne)
- 8Ball & MJG – Ten Toes Down (Grand Hustle/eOne)
- DJ Kay Slay – More Than Just a DJ (Streetsweepers/eOne)
- Kane & Able – Back On Money (eOne)
- J. Dawg – Still Behind Tint (eOne)

=== 2011 ===
- Fair to Midland – Arrows and Anchors (eOne)
- The Human Abstract – Digital Veil (eOne)
- Kittie – I've Failed You (eOne)
- Trust Company – Dreaming in Black and White (eOne)
- Wu-Tang Clan – Legendary Weapons (eOne)
- Brian McKnight – Just Me (Mr. Sloane/eOne)
- Chickenfoot – Chickenfoot III (eOne)
- Chimaira – The Age of Hell (eOne)
- Crowbar – Sever the Wicked Hand (eOne)
- Darkest Hour – The Human Romance (eOne)
- Pop Evil – War of Angels (eOne)
- DJ Drama – Third Power (Aphilliates/Powerhouse/eOne)
- Styles P – Master of Ceremonies (D-Block/eOne)
- Cam'ron & Vado – Gunz n' Butta (Diplomat/eOne)
- Boss Hogg Outlawz – Serve & Collect III (Boss Hogg/eOne)
- Gorilla Zoe – King Kong (Block/Atlantic/eOne)
- Keith Sweat – Til the Morning (KDS/eOne)
- Eric Roberson – Mister Nice Guy (Blue Erro Soul/Purpose Music/eOne/Dome)

=== 2012 ===
- High on Fire – De Vermis Mysteriis (eOne)
- Smile Empty Soul – 3's (eOne)
- Impending Doom – Baptized In Filth (eOne)
- No Bragging Rights – Cycles (eOne)
- This or the Apocalypse – Dead Years (eOne)
- Faith Evans – R&B Divas (Prolific/eOne)
- The Contortionist – Intrinsic (Good Fight/eOne)
- DJ Drama – Quality Street Music (Aphilliates/Powerhouse/eOne)
- Avatar – Black Waltz (eOne)
- Bobby V – Dusk Till Dawn (Blu Kolla/eOne)
- Styles P – The World's Most Hardest MC Project (D-Block/eOne)
- Sheek Louch & Ghostface Killah – Wu Block (eOne)
- Vivian Green – The Green Room (eOne)
- Anthony David – Love Out Loud (Purpose/eOne)
- Jerry Douglas – Traveler (eOne)
- Madness – Oui Oui Si Si Ja Ja Da Da (Lucky 7/Cookin/eOne)
- Dwele – Greater Than One (eOne)
- The Alchemist – Russian Roulette (ALC/Decon/Shady/eOne)
- 8Ball – Life's Quest (E1)

=== 2013 ===
- Joe Budden – No Love Lost (Mood Muzik/eOne)
- Paris Combo – 5 (DRG/eOne)
- Spoken – Illusion (eOne)
- Dark Sermon – In Tongues (Good Fight/eOne)
- Bilal – A Love Surreal (eOne)
- Brian McKnight – More Than Words (Mr. Sloane/eOne)
- Rich Boy – Break the Pot (Vice/eOne)
- N.O.R.E. – Student of the Game (Militainment Business/Conglomerate/eOne)
- Jake Miller – The Road Less Traveled (Future History/eOne)
- Conditions – Full of War (Good Fight/eOne)
- David Archuleta – No Matter How Far (eOne)
- Pop Evil – Onyx (eOne)
- Donell Jones – Forever (Candyman/eOne)
- Ronald Isley – This Song Is For You (RI Top Ten/eOne)
- Sean Kingston – Back 2 Life (Beluga Heights/Epic/eOne)
- K-Ci & JoJo – My Brother's Keeper (Soda Pop/eOne)
- Young Dro – High Times (Grand Hustle/Atlantic/eOne)
- Devin the Dude – One for the Road (Coughee Brothaz Music/Greenstreets/eOne)
- Jake Miller – Us Against Them (eOne)
- Chris Webby – Homegrown (Homegrown/eOne)

=== 2014 ===
- Algebra Blessett – Recovery (Purpose Music/eOne)
- Ashanti – BraveHeart (Written/eOne)
- Erica Campbell – Help (My Block/eOne)
- Kelly Price – Sing Pray Love, Vol. 1: Sing (Sang Girl/eOne)
- Bubba Sparxxx – Made On McCosh Mill Road (New South/eOne)
- Black Label Society – Catacombs of the Black Vatican (Mascot/eOne)
- Ca$h Out – Let's Get It (E1)
- Michelle Williams – Journey to Freedom (Light/eOne)
- The Game – Blood Moon: Year of the Wolf (Blood Money/Fifth Amendment/eOne)
- Traci Braxton – Crash & Burn (eOne)
- Dave Hollister – Spend the Night (eOne)
- Syleena Johnson – Chapter 6: Couples Therapy (eOne)
- Joe Budden – Some Love Lost (Mood Muzik/eOne)
- Chris Webby – Chemically Imbalanced (Homegrown/eOne)

=== 2015 ===
- Project Pat – Mista Don't Play 2: Everythangs Money (Project/Taylor Gang/eOne)
- Young Dro – Da Reality Show (Grand Hustle/eOne)
- The Game – The Documentary 2 (Blood Money/eOne)
- Joe Budden – All Love Lost (Mood Muzik/eOne)
- The Game – The Documentary 2.5 (Blood Money/eOne)
- Lalah Hathaway – Lalah Hathaway Live (Hathaway Entertainment/eOne)

=== 2016 ===
- Tweet – Charlene (eOne)
- Drowning Pool – Hellelujah (eOne)
- SWV – Still (eOne)
- Coastgaard – Devil on the Balcony (eOne)
- Eileen Ivers – Beyond the Bog Road (Musical Bridge/eOne)
- Cilver – Not the End of the World (eOne)
- Soul Asylum – Change of Fortune (eOne)
- Musiq Soulchild – Life on Earth (My Block/eOne)
- Zakk Wylde – Book of Shadows II (eOne)
- Ace Frehley – Origins, Vol. 1 (eOne)
- Jooba Loc – Only Way Out (Doggystyle/eOne)
- Avatar – Feathers & Flesh (eOne)
- The Game – Streets of Compton (Blood Money/eOne)
- Bun E. Carlos – Greetings from Bunezuela! (BunMart/eOne)
- The Rippingtons & Russ Freeman – True Stories (Peak Records/eOne)
- Snoop Dogg – Coolaid (Doggystyle/eOne)
- DJ Drama – Quality Street Music 2 (Aphilliates/Powerhouse/eOne)
- The Game – Block Wars (Blood Money/eOne)
- Kat DeLuna – Loading (eOne)
- Chinx – Legends Never Die (eOne)
- The Game – 1992 (Blood Money/eOne)
- Dope – Blood Money Part 1 (eOne)
- Whores – Gold (eONe)

=== 2017 ===
- Through the Eyes of the Dead – Disomus (Good Fight/eOne)

=== 2019 ===
- Enterprise Earth – Luciferous (Good Fight/eOne)

== 2020s ==
=== 2020 ===
- Enterprise Earth – Foundation of Bones (eOne)

=== 2022 ===
- Enterprise Earth – The Chosen (eOne)

=== 2023 ===
- Dope – Blood Money Part Zer0 (eOne)

=== 2024 ===
- Enterprise Earth – Death: An Anthology (MNRK)
- Loving – Any Light (Last Gang)
