= Foundation of Bones =

EP by Enterprise Earth
- Released: June 19, 2020
- Recorded: 2020
- Genre: Deathcore
- Length: 21:20
- Label: eOne
- Producer: Gabe Mangold

Enterprise Earth chronology
Enterprise Earth on Audiotree Live (2019)	Foundation of Bones (2020)	The Chosen (2022)

Professional ratings
Review scores
Source	Rating
Dead Press	7/10 stars
Metal Noise	8/10 stars

Foundation of Bones is the second EP by American deathcore band Enterprise Earth, released on June 19, 2020 through eOne. It is the band's first EP since 2014's XXIII. It is the first release from the band without founding guitarist BJ Sampson, the first release with drummer Brandon Zackey, and the first release as a four-piece band. Videos for all the tracks were released and recorded during the COVID-19 pandemic lockdown. The track "There Is No Tomorrow" is originally from 2019's Luciferous.

== Track listing ==
No.	Title	Length
1.	"Foundation of Bones"	3:24
2.	"Now You've Got Something to Die For" (Lamb of God cover)	3:46
3.	"Fermented Offal Discharge" (Necrophagist cover)	4:43
4.	"There Is No Tomorrow" (acoustic)	6:03
5.	"Foundation of Bones" (instrumental)	3:24
Total length:		21:20

== Personnel ==
Enterprise Earth

- Dan Watson – vocals
- Gabe Mangold – guitars, bass, production, mastering, mixing
- Rob Saireh – bass (credit only; does not perform on the album)
- Brandon Zackey – drums

Other personnel

- Chris Ghazel – drum engineering
