= Embodiment (Enterprise Earth album) =

2017 studio album by Enterprise Earth

Studio album by Enterprise Earth
- Released: April 14, 2017
- Genre: Deathcore
- Length: 49:07
- Label: Stay Sick
- Producers: BJ Sampson; Buster Odeholm

Enterprise Earth chronology
Patient 0 (2015)	Embodiment (2017)	Luciferous (2019)

Singles from Embodiment
- 1. "Mortem Incarnatum" Released: February 10, 2017; 2. "Temptress" Released: March 10, 2017; 3. "Father of Abortion" Released: April 7, 2017

Embodiment is the second studio album by American deathcore band Enterprise Earth. The album was released on April 14, 2017, through Stay Sick Recordings. It is the band's last album to be released through the label, as they would sign to Entertainment One/Good Fight in 2018. It is also the band's first album to feature drummer Aaron O'Toole. The album would even reach No. 6 the Billboard's Heatseekers chart.

The first single titled "Mortem Incarnatum" was released on February 10, 2017, along with the album announcement. The second single titled "Temptress" was released on March 10, 2017, which was then followed by the third single titled "Father of Abortion" released on April 7, 2017. A music video for the song "Never Forgive, Never Forget” was released on July 7, 2017, followed by a music video for "Deflesh to Unveil", released on October 11, 2017.

Professional ratings
Review scores
Source	Rating
New Transcendence	10/10

== Track listing ==
Embodiment track listing
No.	Title	Length
1.	"Shroud of Flesh"	4:38
2.	"Mortem Incarnatum"	3:23
3.	"Temptress"	4:16
4.	"Never Forgive, Never Forget"	4:27
5.	"The Draconian Oculus"	3:20
6.	"Serpentiform"	3:08
7.	"Black Earth"	3:04
8.	"Embrace the Ashes"	3:16
9.	"Empty Sockets"	4:03
10.	"Deflesh to Unveil"	3:37
11.	"Father of Abortion"	3:08
12.	"Cruciform"	3:37
13.	"Deathwind"	5:04
Total length:		49:07

== Personnel ==
Enterprise Earth

- Dan Watson – vocals
- BJ Sampson – guitars, bass, engineering, production
- Yusef Johnson – guitar (credit only; does not perform on the album)
- Gabe Mangold – guitar (credit only; does not perform on the album)
- Gordon McPherson – bass (credit only; does not perform on the album)
- Aaron O'Toole – drums

Other personnel

- Chris Wiseman – additional songwriting, guitar solos
- Pär Olofsson – cover art
- Ricky Orozco – engineering
- Buster Odeholm – production, mastering, mixing
