= Chris Taylor (businessman) =

Canadian entertainment lawyer (active 1990– )

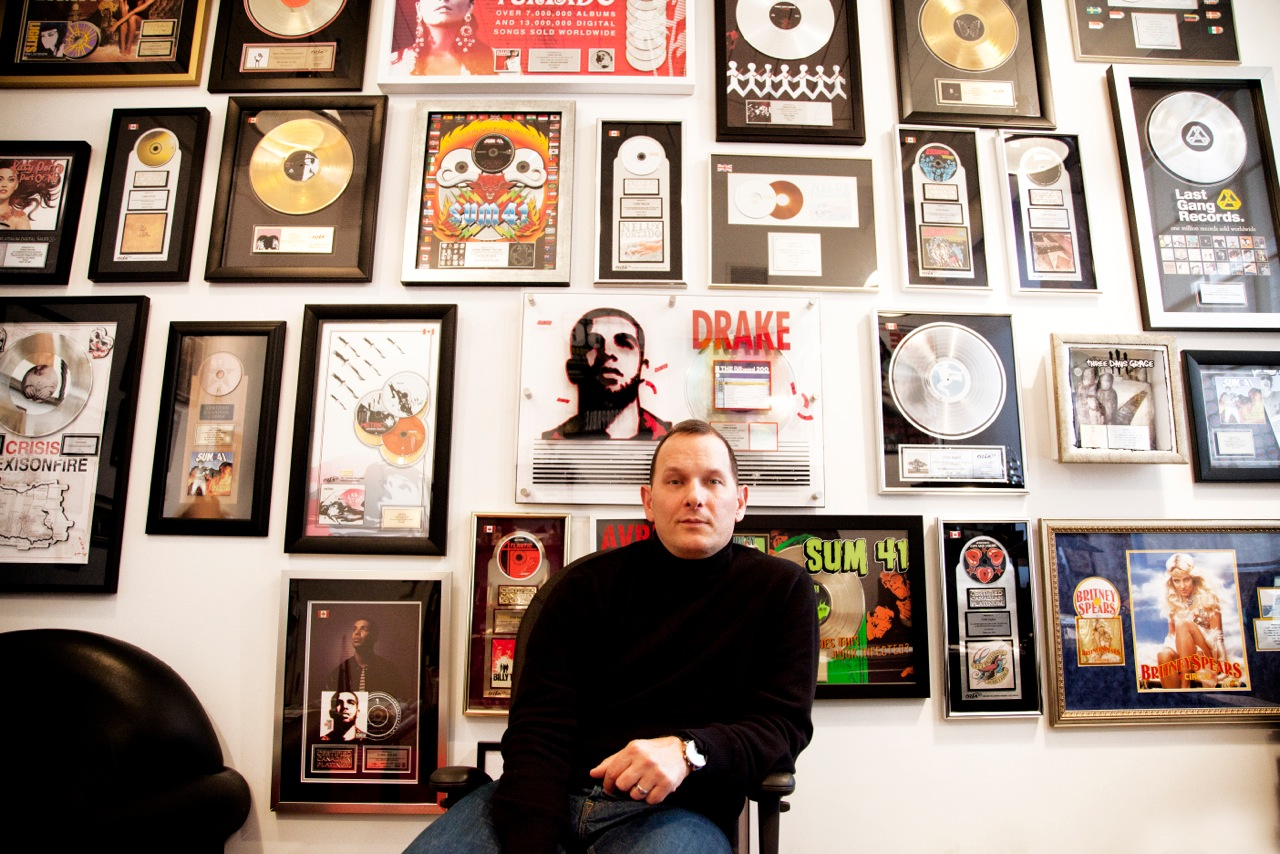
- Born: Christopher Normand Taylor
- Occupations: Attorney; record executive
- Years active: 1980–present
- Label: Last Gang Records

Christopher Normand Taylor is a Canadian entertainment lawyer and record executive.

In 2004, Taylor co-founded Last Gang Records with concert promoter Donald K. Tarlton. The label was acquired by Entertainment One in 2016, with Taylor becoming the president of eOne's music operations. He was the president and CEO of eOne Music, which was renamed MNRK Music Group in 2021. In 2024 he resigned from MNRK to found Hall of Fame Artists.

== Career ==
After graduating from law school, Taylor founded the rock/reggae group One in 1990. The band toured North America, playing over a thousand shows, released four albums, and was nominated for a Juno Award. In 1994, the band signed with Virgin Records and released their fourth album, Smokin' The Goats, which included two Canadian Top 40 singles, "Wide Load" and "54–46".

In 1997, he began practising law with the law firm of Sanderson Taylor representing Canadian artists Nelly Furtado, Avril Lavigne, and Tom Cochrane, among others.

In 1998, via his former manager, Chris Smith, Taylor discovered Nelly Furtado and assisted with introducing her talents to record companies in the United States. Shortly following Furtado's rise, Taylor played a role in introducing Sum 41 to the music industry. More recently, he had been working for rap artist Drake.

In 2003, he founded entertainment company Last Gang Entertainment with music industry promoter and impresario Donald Tarlton, discovering and signing alternative/dance artists Metric, Death From Above 1979, MSTRKRFT, and Crystal Castles. The label has been nominated as Canadian Independent Record Label of the Year at the Canadian Music Awards eight times, with its latest nomination in 2014. Last Gang Management manages Lights and Arkells and co-manages Ryan Hemsworth, BadBadNotGood, Holy Fuck, Tennyson, and chef Matty Matheson, in partnership with management company People's Champ.

In 2006, he cofounded his own law firm, Taylor Mitsopulos Klein Oballa, representing additional acts such as Billy Talent, Three Days Grace, Justin Nozuka, Daniel Powter, Alexisonfire, Gogol Bordello, and Lights in addition to producers and songwriters such as Henry "Cirkut" Walter and Gordon Lightfoot. The law firm also provides legal advice to YTV's number-one-rated show, The Next Star, Canada's Walk of Fame, charitable organization Free The Children, and Slaight Music. Taylor was the long-time lawyer for Canadian media personalities George Stroumboulopoulos and Matte Babel, among others. In January 2012, the law firm changed its name to Taylor Klein Oballa LLP.

In March 2016, Taylor sold Last Gang to Entertainment One and took the position of President of Entertainment One's music division. The management division at Entertainment One added management companies Hardlivings and Nerve, which handle clients including Riton, Tieks, Jax Jones, Tiga, The Black Madonna, and Daniel Avery. Entertainment One's music division was named the #2 Independent Label in the US in 2016, and the artists associated with the company had a total of nine Grammy Award nominations for 2017.

eOne publishing entered into joint venture with Grammy winning producer/writers, "Stereotypes" in August 2018.

Taylor led the sale of Hasbro/eOne’s music business to Blackstone for USD $385 million in cash with the deal closing on June 29, 2021. The music business was renamed, MNRK Music Group on September 27, 2021 and Taylor was named President & CEO. He left MNRK Music Group on July 1, 2024 to found, Hall of Fame Artists, a talent management firm with a plan to grow a recording and music publishing division.

Taylor is an executive producer of the "House of Strombo" concert series along with George Stroumboulopoulos, Michael Sugar, and Bob Mackowycz. In April 2017, Apple Music announced its partnership with House of Strombo. In 2019, Taylor served as executive producer of “Shoulder to Shoulder: A Centennial Tribute to Women's Suffrage” by The Karrin Allyson Sextet. Taylor is on the advisory board for Ricky Martin’s, Martin Music Lab. In December 2021 Taylor was a guest on the Trapital podcast with host Dan Runcie discussing MNRK, the music business and technology.

== Awards ==
In 2013, Taylor was honored by the Canadian Civil Liberties Association for Excellence in Advocacy alongside former Supreme Court Justice The Honourable Ian Binnie, and filmmaker David Cronenberg.

In 2017, 2018, 2019, 2020, 2021, 2022, 2023, and 2024. Billboard magazine included Taylor in their "Indie Music Business Power List", and in June 2018 Variety magazine named Taylor as one of its "International Music Industry Leaders".

In 2018, the Canadian Independent Music Association awarded him the Entrepreneur of the Year Award.

In 2021, Taylor was included alongside Beyonce, The Weeknd, Jay Z, and Shakira in Billboard magazine’s first "Change Agents" list, honoring leaders across the music industry who stepped up over the past year to help the industry survive the pandemic and respond to calls for social and racial justice.

In 2023 Taylor won a Grammy Award as executive producer on the Best Latin Jazz Album of the Year, Fandango at the Wall in New York (2022) by the Afro Latin Jazz Orchestra directed by Arturo O'Farrill.
