= Patient zero (disambiguation) =

Patient zero (also known as the "index case") is the first documented patient in a disease epidemic within a population.

Patient Zero or Patient 0 may also refer to:

== Arts and entertainment ==
=== Songs ===
- "Patient Zero" (song), by Taylor Swift, 2026
- "Patient Zero", by Aimee Mann from the 2017 album Mental Illness
- "Patient Zero", by Cypecore from the 2024 album Make Me Real
- "Patient Zero", by Enterprise Earth from the 2015 album Patient 0
- "Patient Zero", by Hammerfall from the 2011 album Infected

=== Film and television ===
- Patient Zero (film), 2018 science fiction horror
- "Patient Zero", 2001 television episode of the Outer Limits

=== Other uses in arts and entertainment ===
- Weasel (Marvel Comics), also known as Patient Zero, supervillain
- Patient 0 (Enterprise Earth album), 2015
- "Patient Zero" (audio drama), 2009 episode of Doctor Who: The Monthly Adventures
- Patient Zero: A Joe Ledger Novel, 2009, by Jonathan Maberry
- Patient Zero, 2005 demoscene production by Farbrausch
- Patient Zero, campaign in the 2016 video game Hitman
- "Patient Zero", 2001 short story by Tananarive Due

== People ==
- Gaëtan Dugas (1952–1984), Canadian flight attendant dubbed "Patient Zero" in the AIDS epidemic

== See also ==
- Cabin Fever: Patient Zero, 2014 science fiction horror film
- Killing Patient Zero, 2019 Canadian documentary about Gaëtan Dugas
- Zero Patience, 1993 musical about AIDS
