= Last Gang Records =

Canadian record label

- Parent company: MNRK Music Group
- Founded: 2003; 22 years ago
- Founder: Chris Taylor; Donald K. Tarlton
- Distributor(s): MNRK Music Group
- Country of origin: Canada
- Location: Toronto, Ontario

Last Gang Records is a record label formed by Canadian music industry lawyer Chris Taylor and concert promoter Donald K. Tarlton in the fall of 2003 at the Pop Montreal Music Festival. Last Gang was nominated as Independent Record Label of the Year at the Canadian Music Awards in 2006.

It was acquired by Entertainment One in March 2016, with Taylor being appointed the new president of eOne Music, now MNRK Music Group.

== Last Gang Publishing ==
Founded in 2006, Last Gang Publishing is a music publishing company with primary operations based in Toronto, Canada, and Los Angeles, USA.

Last Gang Publishing represents both external clients, such as Dubmatix, Egyptrixx, and Hiawatha, and internal Last Gang Records recording artists, such as Mother Mother, Silver Starling, and O'Luge.

== Artists ==
Last Gang Records has released albums by:

- Arkells
- Bang Lime
- Bear Mountain
- Billy Talent
- Boys Noize
- Chromeo
- Crystal Castles
- Dark Horses
- Death from Above 1979
- Dirty Ghosts
- Emay
- Egyptrixx
- Electric Youth
- Emily Haines & the Soft Skeleton
- Fan Death
- Femme Fatale
- From Fiction
- Fur Trade
- Sebastien Grainger
- Ryan Hemsworth
- Hiawatha
- Hot As Sun
- Huoratron
- The Jealous Girlfriends
- Kay
- The Kickdrums
- K-OS
- Leisure Cruise
- Let's Go To War
- Lights
- Loving
- Magneta Lane
- Metric
- The Meligrove Band
- Mixhell
- Modern Superstitions
- Moon King
- Mother Mother
- MSTRKRFT
- The New Pornographers
- AC Newman
- Nightbox
- Noble Oak
- O'Luge
- Ohbijou
- Operators
- Lindi Ortega
- Panurge
- Purity Ring
- PVT
- Rush Midnight
- San Sebastian
- Silver Starling
- Slan
- Standish / Carlyon
- Stars
- Mark Sultan
- Terry Lynn
- Ten Kens
- Tiga
- Tizzy Gang
- Tricky Woo
- The Two Koreas
- We Are Enfant Terrible
- Wolf & Cub

== Gold and Platinum Certifications ==
Metric Old World Underground: Where Are You Now?

Country	Certification	Sales/shipments
Canada	Gold	50,000

Death From Above, 1979 You're A woman; I'm A Machine

Country	Certification	Sales/shipments
Canada	Gold	50,000

Metric Live It Out

Country	Certification	Sales/shipments
Canada	Platinum	100,000

Metric Fantasies

Country	Certification	Sales/shipments
Canada	Platinum	80,000

== Awards and nominations ==
=== Juno Awards ===
Year	Nominee / work	Award	Result
2005	A.C. Newman The Slow Wonder	Alternative Album Of The Year	Nominated
2005	Death From Above 1979	New Group Of The Year	Nominated
2005	Death From Above 1979 You're A Woman, I'm A Machine	CD/DVD Artwork Of The Year	Nominated
2006	Metric Live It Out	Alternative Album Of The Year	Nominated
2007	Tiga Sexor	Dance Recording Of The Year	Won
2007	MSTRKRFT The Looks	CD/DVD Artwork Of The Year	Won
2008	Chromeo Fancy Footwork	Dance Recording Of The Year	Nominated
2009	Crystal Castles	New Group Of The Year	Nominated
2010	Metric Fantasies	Alternative Album Of The Year	Won
2010	Metric	Group Of The Year	Won
2010	Emily Haines & Jimmy Shaw for "Gimme Sympathy", "Sick Muse", "Help I'm Alive" from Fantasies	Songwriter Of The Year	Nominated
2011	Chromeo Business Casual	Dance Recording Of The Year	Nominated
2011	Crystal Castles (II)	Electronic Album Of The Year	Nominated
2012	Lindi Ortega	New Artist Of The Year	Nominated
2012	Lindi Ortega Little Red Boots	Roots & Traditional Of The Year (Solo)	Nominated
2012	Mother Mother	New Group Of The Year	Nominated
2012	Mother Mother The Stand (dir. John JP Poliquin)	Video Of The Year	Nominated
2013	Crystal Castles (III)	Electronic Album Of The Year	Nominated
2013	Purity Ring Shrines	Electronic Album Of The Year	Nominated
2014	Ryan Hemsworth Guilt Trips	Electronic Album Of The Year	Won

=== Polaris Music Prize ===
The Polaris Music Prize is awarded annually to the best full-length Canadian album based on artistic merit. Last Gang Records has had three albums make the short list and 11 nominations on the long list.

Year	Nominee / work	Award	Result
2006	Metric Live It Out	Polaris Music Prize	Nominated
2009	Metric Fantasies	Polaris Music Prize	Nominated
2013	Purity Ring Shrines	Polaris Music Prize	Nominated

== See also ==
- List of record labels
