= Dark Horses (band) =

British rock band

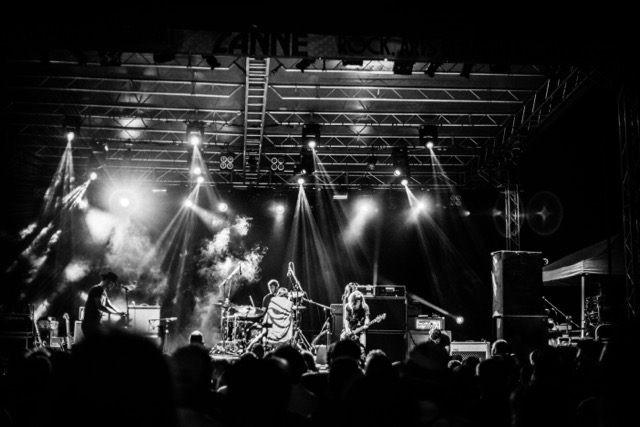
- Dark Horses performing at the 2014 Zanne Festival

Background information
- Origin: Brighton, UK
- Genres: Psychedelic rock; post-punk; new wave; electronic
- Years active: 2010–present
- Label: Last Gang
- Members: Lisa Elle; Bobby Waterson; Stevie Ingham; David Wheeldon; Anastasia Zio; Ali Tollervey; Pierre Angelique
- Past members: Andy Bang; Dom Keen; Harry Bohay Nowell; Tommy Chain
- Website: www.darkhorsesmusic.com

Dark Horses are a British rock band formed in 2010, consisting of lead vocalist Lisa Elle, synth player/guitarist Bobby Waterson, lead guitarist David Wheeldon, electric bass Anastasia Zio and drummer Stevie Ingham. The band's formation also includes Ali Tollervey, photographer, and Pierre Angelique, visual and video artist.

The band has gained following with their two studio LPs, Black music and Hail Lucid State (2014), both produced by Richard Fearless and released on Last Gang Records.

== History ==
The band formed during a recording session with the producer Richard Fearless from Death in Vegas at Key Club Recording Company studios in Michigan U.S.A. In August 2012 their first single, "Radio", was released followed by the LP Black Music on Last Gang Records in September 2012. Their second single, "Alone", was released April 2013.

One of their debut performances was opening for Kasabian at Wembley arena followed by a UK tour supporting Black Rebel Motorcycle Club In the meantime, the single "Radio" found its way onto the BBC 6Music A-list and saw the group win Artrocker’s "Single of the Year."

The band were invited to play a number of opening live dates in the U.K, Europe and Australia with Black Angels, Black Mountain, Beck, Sigur Ros and Tame Impala with performances at festivals including Glastonbury Festival BBC Introducing Stage, Festival N°6, The Great Escape, Harvest Festival Australia, Hard Rock Calling, the highlight being invited by Noel Gallagher and Roger Daltrey to play the Teenage Cancer Trust Concert at The Royal Albert Hall.

The band released Fugitive Atmospheres EP in April 2013 on Last Gang Records.

Dark Horses contributed "Jul Song" to A Psych Christmas album released November 2013. Their version of "Hello I Love You" was included on a Doors covers album with fellow artists such as Iggy Pop, Clinic, Black Angels and Dead Meadow, released March 2014 both on L.A. label Cleopatra Records.

Their second album, Hail Lucid State, was recorded at Retreat Studios in East Sussex, England, produced again by Richard Fearless and released August 2014 on Last Gang Records.

This was followed by U.K and European tours in 2014/15 headlining, opening for the Dandy Warhols and performing at the Zanne Festival, Reeperbahn Festival, Montreux Jazz Festival alongside Dirty Beaches, Blonde Redhead, Toy, Clinic, The Vacant Lots and Lola Colt, stopping off in Berlin to record a session with Anton Newcombe of Brian Jonestown Massacre.

The single "Live on Hunger" was released April 2014, followed by "Saturn Returns" released July 2015, both on Last Gang Records.

The band returned with the single "XIII" in November 2017, co-produced by Bob Earland (Wiley, Roots Manuva, BBC Radiophonic Workshop). The release coincided with a string of European tour dates supporting Black Rebel Motorcycle Club.

== Discography ==
=== Studio albums ===
- Black Music (2012)
- Hail Lucid State (2014)
- While We Were Sleeping (2023)

=== EPs ===
- Fugitive Atmospheres (2013)

=== Singles ===
- "Radio" (2012)
- "Alone" (2013)
- "Live on Hunger" (2014)
- "Saturn Returns" (2015)
- "XIII" (2017)
- "Hyper Green" (2023)
