= Arrows and Anchors =

Studio album by Fair to Midland
- Released: July 11, 2011
- Recorded: November–December 2010 at Joe's House of Compression, Pasadena, California
- Genre: Alternative metal, progressive rock
- Length: 54:37
- Label: E1 Music; Season of Mist
- Producer: Joe Barresi

Fair to Midland chronology
Fables from a Mayfly: What I Tell You Three Times Is True (2007)	Arrows and Anchors (2011)

Singles from Arrows and Anchors
- 1. "Musical Chairs" Released: April 4, 2011; 2. "Amarillo Sleeps on My Pillow" Released: May 19, 2011

Arrows and Anchors is the fourth and final studio album by the Texas progressive rock band Fair to Midland, released on July 11, 2011, by E1 Music in North America. In Europe, the record was released by Season of Mist the day before. The album was produced, recorded and mixed by Joe Barresi. The record peaked at No. 65 on the Billboard 200.

== Release and promotion ==
On April 4, the band debuted the album's first single, "Musical Chairs", on the website ArtistDirect.com. It became available on iTunes on April 18. On May 19, the band released the track "Amarillo Sleeps on My Pillow" for free download on their website.

== Reception ==
Professional ratings
Review scores
Source	Rating
AllMusic	3.5/5 stars
Revolver	3.5/5 stars
Melodic.net	4.5/5 stars

The album debuted at no. 65 on the U.S. Billboard 200 chart, selling 7,000 copies and marking the band's highest spot on the chart.

== Track list ==
All lyrics are written by Darroh Sudderth; all music is composed by Fair to Midland

No.	Title	Length
1.	"Heavens to Murgatroyd"	0:44
2.	"Whiskey & Ritalin"	3:37
3.	"Musical Chairs"	3:32
4.	"Uh-Oh"	4:16
5.	"Amarillo Sleeps on My Pillow"	4:42
6.	"A Loophole in Limbo"	3:39
7.	"Typhoid Mary Sends Her Best"	0:56
8.	"Short-Haired Tornado"	4:19
9.	"The Upset at Bailey Bridge"	0:52
10.	"Rikki Tikki Tavi"	3:25
11.	"Golden Parachutes"	3:44
12.	"Bright Bulbs & Sharp Tools"	3:57
13.	"Coppertank Island"	3:10
14.	"Three Foolproof Ways to Buy the Farm"	2:47
15.	"The Greener Grass"	10:57

European limited edition and US iTunes bonus track
No.	Title	Length
16.	"Pour the Coal to 'er"	3:32

US iTunes and official website pre-order bonus track
No.	Title	Length
17.	"Rikki Tikki Tavi" (Live)	3:21

Official website pre-order bonus track
No.	Title	Length
18.	"Uh Oh" (Live)	4:34

The live versions of "Rikki Tikki Tavi" and "Uh-Oh" were also released as B-sides on the digital single "Amarillo Sleeps on My Pillow".

No further tracks were recorded for the album, however several songs were considered for the album during pre-production:

- The titles "The Dead Sea", "Ember Rose" and "Babe Ruthe" (reportedly re-titled to "God Save Us") can be seen written on the band's pre-production track list.

== Personnel ==
Fair to Midland

- Darroh Sudderth – vocals, banjo on "Amarillo Sleeps on My Pillow"
- Cliff Campbell – guitar
- Jon Dicken – bass guitar
- Matt Langley – keyboards, marxophone
- Brett Stowers – drums

Production

- Brian Gardner – mastering
- Isaac "Eye-Sack" Flores – artwork
- Sean Oakley – assistant engineer
- Jun Murakawa – assistant engineer
- Morgan Stratton – assistant engineer
- Joe Barresi – mixed, recorded, producer

== Charts ==
Chart (2011)	Peak position
U.S. Billboard 200	65
