= Dance of the Manatee =

Single by Fair to Midland

from the album Fables from a Mayfly: What I Tell You Three Times Is True
- Released: March 13, 2007
- Recorded: 2007
- Genre: Alternative metal; art rock
- Length: 4:10 (album version); 4:03 (radio edit)
- Label: Serjical Strike
- Songwriter(s): Darroh Sudderth, Fair to Midland
- Producer(s): David Bottrill / Serj Tankian

Fair to Midland singles chronology
"Dance of the Manatee" (2007)	"Tall Tales Taste Like Sour Grapes" (2007)

"Dance of the Manatee" is a song by the American art rock band, Fair to Midland. It was originally the second track on inter.funda.stifle, but was also re-recorded for Fables from a Mayfly: What I Tell You Three Times Is True. It was released as their debut single in 2007.

== Song meaning ==
In an interview, Fair to Midland guitarist, Cliff Campbell, said, "everybody has a different interpretation for all of our songs, and that's kind of what they're written for, to be open to interpretation. But if you ask me personally, I didn't write it, I've just read the lyrics, but what I get from it is what society views the modern day man as. That's what I get from it... he's the modern day man; he's just being treated how people treat a man that. You know, actually, he's not a modern day man. Because what people want in a modern day man, he is not him. It's just an example of what happens nowadays to people who are polite, kind, and who bend over backwards to help people. It's really like no pride, he's just out there and they're not really looking for him, you know what I mean, and nobody's there to care anymore. That's just what I get from it."

== Charts ==
Chart (2017)	Peak position
US Mainstream Rock (Billboard)	19

== Track listing ==
All lyrics are written by Darroh Sudderth

No.	Title	Length
1.	"Dance of the Manatee" (Radio Edit)	3:35
2.	"Dance of the Manatee" (Album Version)	4:03

- Music video "Dance of the Manatee"
