= Tall Tales Taste Like Sour Grapes =

Single by Fair to Midland

from the album Fables from a Mayfly: What I Tell You Three Times Is True
- Released: October 2, 2007
- Recorded: 2007
- Genre: Art rock
- Length: 4:03 (album version); 3:35 (radio edit)
- Label: Serjical Strike
- Songwriter(s): Darroh Sudderth, Fair to Midland
- Producer(s): David Bottrill / Serj Tankian

Fair to Midland singles chronology
""Dance of the Manatee"" (2007)	"Tall Tales Taste Like Sour Grapes" (2007)	"Musical Chairs" (2011)

"Tall Tales Taste Like Sour Grapes" is a song by the American art rock band, Fair to Midland. It was originally the ninth track on their album Fables from a Mayfly: What I Tell You Three Times Is True, and was released as their second single in 2007. The song was first released on their independent sampler disc, Selections from Fables from a Mayfly.

== Charts ==
Chart (2017)	Peak position
US Mainstream Rock (Billboard)	38

== Track listing ==
All lyrics are written by Darroh Sudderth.

No.	Title	Length
1.	"Tall Tales Taste Like Sour Grapes" (Radio Edit)	3:35
2.	"Tall Tales Taste Like Sour Grapes" (Album Version)	4:03
