= Chris Webby =

American rapper (born 1988)

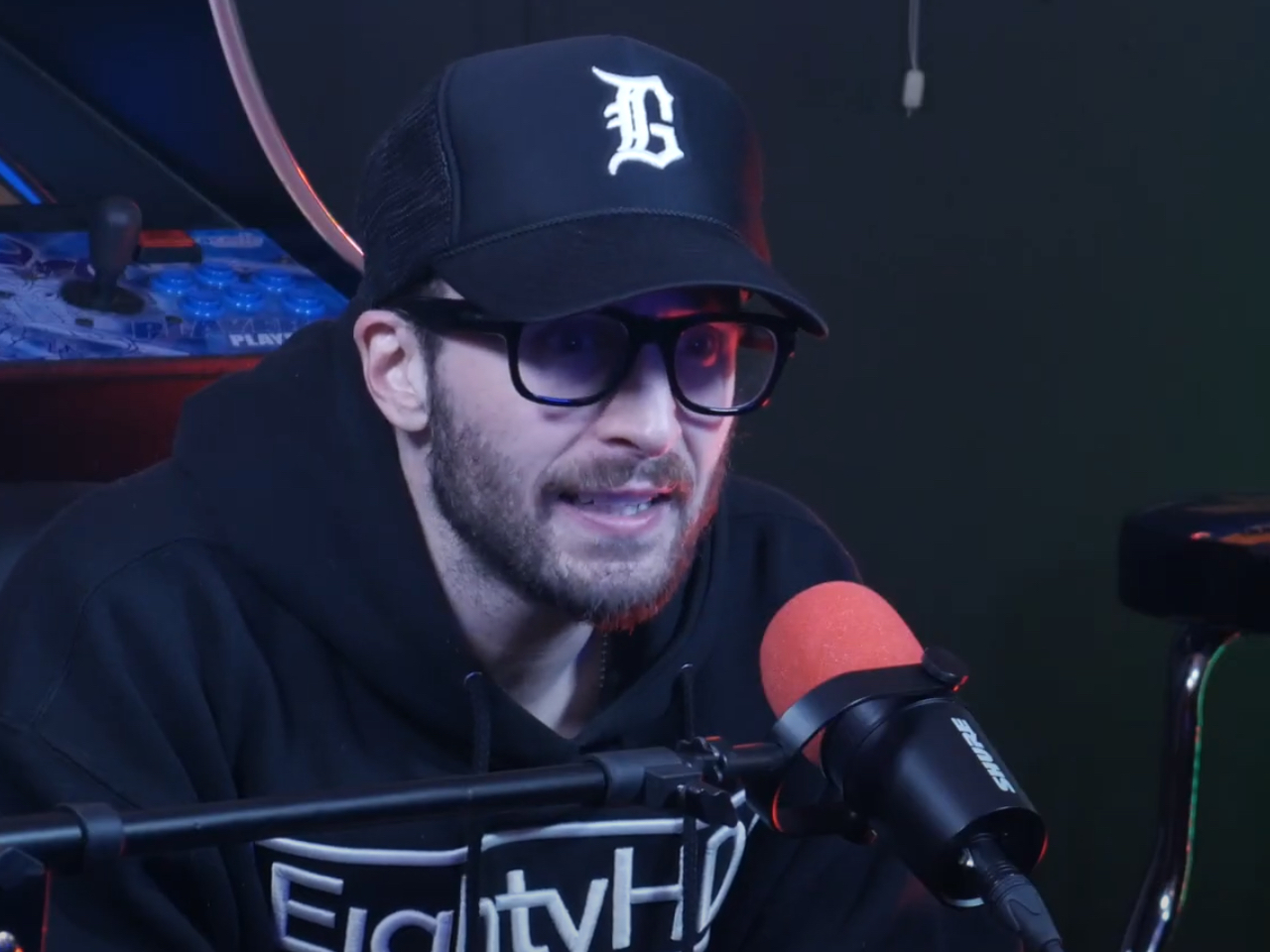
- Webster in 2023

Background information
- Born: Christian Talcott Webster; October 13, 1988 (age 38); Norwalk, Connecticut, U.S.
- Genre: Hip-hop
- Occupations: Rapper; songwriter
- Years active: 2007–present
- Labels: eOne Music; Homegrown; EightyHD
- Website: chriswebby.com

Christian Talcott Webster (born October 13, 1988), better known by his stage name Chris Webby, is an American rapper. Webster has released many mixtapes such as the DJ Drama-hosted Bars On Me (2012) and his EP There Goes the Neighborhood (2011), which peaked at number 101 on the Billboard 200. He has worked with various artists such as Tory Lanez, DMX, Young M.A, and Busta Rhymes. In 2013, he and his label, Homegrown Music Group, signed a deal with eOne Music. He then released Homegrown, another EP, in November 2013. Webster released his debut studio album Chemically Imbalanced on October 27, 2014.

Webster is the creator of the #WebbyWednesday series where he releases new singles and videos every Wednesday. The series has resulted in eight full-length albums that include original and previously released tracks. He is also the last artist to record with DMX.

== Early life ==
Webster was born on October 13, 1988, in Norwalk, Connecticut. His mother was a middle school teacher at Nathan Hale Middle School, his father was a guitarist and he was their only child. He started listening to rap at a young age admiring Eminem, he then started writing his own raps in 2000 at age 11. He attended Greens Farms Academy, a private school in Westport, Connecticut.

== Musical career ==
=== 2007–2011: Mixtapes ===
After graduating from Green Farms Academy in 2007, Webster went to Hofstra University in Long Island, New York, on scholarship. During this time his rap name was Vindictive, and was a known freestyler through the frat houses, himself being a member of Sigma Alpha Epsilon fraternity (ΣΑΕ). He was arrested on March 27, 2009, during his sophomore year, in connection with a failed robbery attempt of a drug dealer on Hofstra University campus. He would then spend a week in jail and be banned from the school. Following getting kicked out he looked at rapping as a career, and focused on releasing music.

On April 30, 2009, Webster released his debut mixtape The White Noise LP. The mixtape featured his first hit single "La La La," first released on April 17, 2009, on YouTube, based on "Around the World" by EVO Productions (aka Miguel Valor) and samples ATC's "Around The World". He performed at local Connecticut venues, including Toad's Place and the Heirloom Arts Theatre. Then on September 19, 2009, he released his second mixtape Teenage Mutant Ninja Rapper. The two mixtapes included tracks he had recorded since 2008.

On May 10, 2010, he released his third mixtape Optimus Rhyme, intended to be a prelude to his fourth mixtape The Underclassmen. The project was billed as a "mini-mixtape" and was primarily a compilation of his unreleased tracks. He teamed up with DJBooth to release his fourth mixtape The Underclassmen on July 14, 2010, which featured a guest appearance by Mac Miller and others. The mixtape contains disses towards fellow rapper Sammy Adams.

On December 21, 2010, Webster released his fifth mixtape Best in the Burbs. The mixtape featured collaborations with Statik Selektah, Ski Beatz, and Big K.R.I.T. and has been downloaded over 200,000 times on DatPiff. It had even shut down DatPiff's servers due to the high number of downloads upon its release, the first mixtape to do so.

=== 2011–2012: Webster's Laboratory and There Goes the Neighborhood ===
On June 3, 2011, Webster released his sixth mixtape Webster's Laboratory. The mixtape was hosted by DJ Ill Will and DJ Rockstar, which featured guest appearances from rappers Freeway, Gorilla Zoe, Kinetics (of Kinetics & One Love) and Apathy. This mixtape also resulted in DatPiff's server crashing. The mixtape was met with positive reviews, receiving a three out of five or "L" from XXL. Adam Fleischer of XXL said, "Webster's Laboratory ends up being further proof that not only can Webster rap, but his skills are improving with each release. Having said that, his content gets somewhat tired, and Webster's Laboratory is indicative of an artist still trying to find himself and his own sound."

On December 1, 2011, Webster released his first retail project an EP titled There Goes the Neighborhood. The EP would be released by his record label Homegrown Music, and feature a guest appearance by Slaine. Upon its release the EP shot to the top of the iTunes hip/hop sales chart. The EP would end up debuting at number 101 on the Billboard 200, number 13 on the Billboard Top R&B/Hip-Hop Albums chart and topping the Heatseekers Albums chart. On February 10, 2012, he began a 40-date North American tour in support of the EP.

=== 2012–2013: Bars On Me, signing to eOne Music and Homegrown ===
On September 30, 2012, Webster released his seventh mixtape, Bars On Me hosted by famed mixtape DJ, DJ Drama. The mixtape included guest appearances from Bun B, D. Lector, Emilio Rojas, Jon Connor, Kid Ink, Method Man, Nikkiya and Prodigy, with notable production credits coming from Cardo, Sap, Don Cannon, Omen, Ski Beatz, and WillPower among others. Its release was covered by MTV, who interviewed him as he described the title saying, "There's definitely a few meanings that you could use with it, but the main one being lyrical bars. That's what I'm known for, that's what I continue to do, and I think a lot of artists kinda need to step their bars up a little bit." It featured all original material and received over 100,000 downloads on DatPiff in less than a week.

During 2013, Webster hinted at signing with a record label, and that he was in talks with a few. However he said, "I wouldn't want to sign under another rapper just because I want to be THE rapper. With me signing, it's not going to be me changing and selling out. It is going to be me getting an opportunity to really formulate my own thing. Homegrown Music will be my G-Unit, Shady Records, GOOD Music." After remaining independent for his entire career, in mid-2013 he signed a record deal with independent powerhouse eOne Music. Following that he revealed that he was working on an EP and his debut studio album, which he said will "highlight his transformation from a rapper to an artist." On August 28, 2013, Webster released the first single, "Down Right" from his first project after signing with eOne Music. The project was announced to be an EP titled, Homegrown, released on November 12, 2013.

=== 2013–2016: The Checkup, Chemically Imbalanced and Webster's Laboratory 2 ===
Also in August 2013, Webster indicated working with Scott Storch and SupaDupes on his debut album. At the red carpet for the 2013 BET Hip Hop Awards Webster stated his debut album would be released in February 2014. On October 24, 2013, Webster revealed that the EP's release had been pushed back to November 12, 2013, due to sample clearance issues. Following its release, Homegrown would then peak at number 75 on the Billboard 200. In a November 2013 interview with HipHopDX, Webster also confirmed Harry Fraud as a producer on his debut album. He later revealed the album would be titled Chemically Imbalanced.

On June 3, 2014, Webster announced his 8th mixtape, titled The Checkup, to be released on June 17, 2014. Also on June 3, Webster released the first single off The Checkup, named Good Day, featuring fellow Connecticut and Homegrown Music Group rapper, Jitta On The Track. Following the release, on June 10, Webster released Chilly, another song featuring Fat Trel to be on The Checkup. The mixtape was released with ten songs on June 17. On August 19, 2014, Webster digitally released the first single off Chemically Imbalanced, titled "F*ck Off." On September 26, 2014, Webster announced the release date and artwork for Chemically Imbalanced. It was released on October 27, 2014. On July 17, 2015, Webster released his 12th project, "Jamo Neat", a collaboration EP with producer Sap. The project came together over the course of eight days in the studio together. The EP was supported by the singles "Whatchu Need" featuring Sap & Stacey Michelle, and "Vibe 2 It" featuring Sap.

On December 30, 2015, Webster announced on his personal Twitter account that he had begun working on his 13th project and 9th mixtape called Webster's Laboratory 2 (a sequel to the original from 2011) and began releasing new material in promotion of the project. On May 11, 2016, he announced its release date, and Webster's Laboratory 2 was released on June 1, 2016.

=== 2017–present: #WebbyWednesday series ===
Webster broke with his management team in 2016 and hired a new team (EightyHD) in 2017. The same year, he began releasing a new song each Wednesday in a series he called #WebbyWednesday, releasing a total of 25 songs and 10 videos. Webster released the album Wednesday in 2017. The album included singles he had released through #WebbyWednesday as well as unreleased tracks and was said to be a break from his normal musical style.

Webster continued the #WebbyWednesday series the following years, releasing singles and new albums Next Wednesday in 2018 and Wednesday After Next in 2019. He released 28 Wednesdays Later, the fourth album of the series, in 2020. The album included 13 songs from the series as well as seven unreleased tracks with the title of the album being a homage to the film 28 Days Later. It was originally announced to be the last album in the series, but in 2021 he followed up with Still Wednesday, the fifth album from the series. Still Wednesday included tracks with artists including Young M.A, Tory Lanez, and DMX. The track from DMX was the last recorded by the rapper before his death in 2021. Additional #WebbyWednesday albums include Next Wednesday Before Last (2022), Lost Wednesday: The Demos (2024), and Last Wednesday (2024).

In 2025, Webster collaborated with Scott Storch for the EP 88 Milligrams.

In 2026, Webster started releasing a collaboration album with Ren called Inpatient

== Personal life ==
He told AllHipHop in 2013, that he uses Adderall in the studio, which he is prescribed. He explained that he was diagnosed with attention deficit hyperactivity disorder at a young age, and has been on attention medication throughout his life. He says to this day that he has very bad attention deficit hyperactivity disorder. Chris Webby is friends with Pete Davidson, and has an aquarium installed in his home.

== Discography ==
=== Studio albums ===
List of studio albums, with selected chart positions
Title	Album details	Peak chart positions		
Title	Album details	US	US R&B	US Rap
Chemically Imbalanced	Released: October 27, 2014; Label: Homegrown, eOne Music; Format: CD, digital download	25	2	3
"—" denotes a title that did not chart, or was not released in that territory.

=== Extended plays ===
List of extended plays, with selected chart positions
Title	EP details	Peak chart positions		
Title	EP details	US	US R&B	US Rap
There Goes the Neighborhood	Released: December 1, 2011; Label: Homegrown; Format: CD, digital download	101	13	8
Homegrown	Released: November 12, 2013; Label: Homegrown, eOne Music; Format: CD, digital download	75	16	8
Jamo Neat (with Sap)	Released: July 17, 2015; Label: Homegrown, eOne Music; Format: CD, digital download	—	—	15
88 Milligrams (with Scott Storch)	Released: September 16, 2025; Label: EightyHD; Format: CD, digital download	—	—	—
"—" denotes a title that did not chart, or was not released in that territory.

=== Mixtapes ===
Title	Mixtape details
The White Noise LP	Released: April 30, 2009; Label: Self-released; Format: CD, digital download
Teenage Mutant Ninja Rapper	Released: September 19, 2009; Label: Self-released; Format: CD, digital download
Optimus Rhyme	Released: May 10, 2010; Label: Homegrown; Format: CD, digital download
The Underclassmen	Released: July 14, 2010; Label: Homegrown; Format: CD, digital download
Best in the Burbs	Released: December 21, 2010; Label: Homegrown; Format: CD, digital download
Webster's Laboratory	Released: June 3, 2011; Label: Homegrown; Format: CD, digital download
Bars On Me	Released: September 30, 2012; Label: Homegrown; Format: CD, digital download
The Checkup	Released: June 17, 2014; Label: Homegrown; Format: CD, digital download
Webster's Laboratory 2	Released: June 1, 2016; Label: Homegrown; Format: CD, digital download
Wednesday	Released: December 20, 2017; Label: EightyHD; Format: CD, digital download
Next Wednesday	Released: December 19, 2018; Label: EightyHD; Format: CD, digital download
Wednesday After Next	Released: December 29, 2019; Label: EightyHD; Format: CD, digital download
28 Wednesdays Later	Released: December 23, 2020; Label: EightyHD; Format: CD, digital download
Still Wednesday	Released: December 22, 2021; Label: EightyHD; Format: CD, digital download
Wednesday Before Last	Released: December 21, 2022; Label: EightyHD; Format: CD, digital download
Lost Wednesday: The Demos	Released: June 26, 2024; Label: EightyHD; Format: CD, digital download
Last Wednesday	Released: December 25, 2024; Label: EightyHD; Format: CD, digital download
