= The Chosen (album) =

2022 studio album by Enterprise Earth

Studio album by Enterprise Earth
- Released: January 14, 2022
- Recorded: September 2020–January 2021
- Studios: Studio Nessa; Audiohammer Studios, Sanford, FL
- Genres: Deathcore; death metal; progressive metal
- Length: 67:45
- Label: eOne
- Producer: Gabe Mangold

Enterprise Earth chronology
Foundation of Bones (2020)	The Chosen (2022)	Death: An Anthology (2024)

Enterprise Earth studio album chronology
Luciferous (2019)	The Chosen (2022)	Death: An Anthology (2024)

Singles from The Chosen
- 1. "Where Dreams Are Broken" Released: September 10, 2021; 2. "Reanimate // Disintegrate" Released: October 28, 2021; 3. "Legends Never Die" Released: December 9, 2021

Instrumental edition cover
- Artwork used for the Instrumental edition cover

See The Chosen (disambiguation) for other than the album

The Chosen is the fourth studio album by American deathcore band Enterprise Earth, the album was released on January 14, 2022 through eOne. It is the band's first album to feature drummer Brandon Zackey and the final to feature founding vocalist Dan Watson as he would departure from the band on April 12, 2022 after having a premonition of his own death. It is also the band's final album to feature any original members as Watson was the final original member left following BJ Sampson's departure in 2019. An instrumental version of the album was released on September 30, 2022.

== Musical style ==
The band would show a more progressive shift in their deathcore sound in this album, taking on other genres such as death metal and progressive metal.

== Promotion ==
The album was announced on September 10, 2021 along with the release of the first single titled "Where Dreams Are Broken” and its music video. The second single titled "Reanimate // Disintegrate" was released on October 28, 2021 along with its music video. On December 9, 2021, the band announced that they have fired their bassist Rob Saireh and released the third single from the album titled "Legends Never Die". On July 26, 2022, the band released a music video for the song "You Couldn’t Save Me" which featured new vocalist Travis Worland, who replaced Watson on May 2, 2022. The band would accompany the album with a summer tour with support from Within Destruction, Sentinels and Great American Ghost. In late 2022, the band supported Shadow of Intent's tour in North America for their Elegy album with Inferi and Wormhole.

Professional ratings
Review scores
Source	Rating
New Transcendence	8/10
Boolin Tunes	8.5/10
Blabbermouth.net	8.5/10

== Track listing ==
All tracks are written by Enterprise Earth.

The Chosen track listing
No.	Title	Length
1.	"Where Dreams Are Broken"	5:21
2.	"Reanimate // Disintegrate"	6:11
3.	"Unleash Hell"	6:05
4.	"I Have To Escape"	3:35
5.	"The Tower"	1:18
6.	"They Have No Honor"	4:21
7.	"Overpass"	7:47
8.	"You Couldn’t Save Me"	5:57
9.	"Unhallowed Path"	1:29
10.	"Legends Never Die"	4:29
11.	"My Blood, Their Satiation"	5:43
12.	"Skeleton Key"	4:02
13.	"The Chosen"	8:34
14.	"Atlas"	2:53
Total length:		67:45

== Personnel ==
Enterprise Earth

- Dan Watson – vocals
- Gabe Mangold – guitars, bass, production, mastering, mixing, engineering.
- Rob Saireh – bass (credit only; does not perform on the album)
- Brandon Zackey – drums

Guests

- Matt Honeycutt (Kublai Khan) – vocals on "Overpass"

Other personnel

- Jason Suecof – drum engineering
- Tony Koehl – cover art
