= Chemically Imbalanced (Chris Webby album) =

Studio album by Chris Webby
- Released: October 27, 2014
- Recorded: 2012–2014
- Genre: Hip-hop
- Length: 67:59
- Labels: Homegrown; eOne
- Producers: Alex 'AK' Kresovich; Ben Billions; Brix; ID Labs; Kato; Krunkadelic; Prestige; SAP; Scott Storch; Skrizzly Adams; Supa Dups; WLPWR

Chris Webby chronology
Homegrown (2013)	Chemically Imbalanced (2014)

Singles from Chemically Imbalanced
- 1. "Fuck Off" Released: August 19, 2014; 2. "R.A.D. (Roll A Doobie)" Released: October 1, 2014; 3. "Let's Do It Again" Released: October 7, 2014; 4. "Dopamine" Released: October 14, 2014; 5. "Stand Up" Released: October 21, 2014

Chemically Imbalanced is the debut studio album of American rapper Chris Webby. The album was released in stores and on iTunes October 27, 2014. The album featured appearances from Dizzy Wright, Jarren Benton, Tech N9ne, and others.

Professional ratings
Review scores
Source	Rating
AllMusic	3.5/5 stars

== Background ==
Webby began to speak about releasing his debut album following the release of his second EP, Homegrown. On September 26, 2014, Webby released album art and a release date for the album. He has also released dates for the Chemically Imbalanced Tour in order to promote the album. On October 1, the album was made available for pre-orders on iTunes.

== Promotion ==
On August 14, Webby announced the release for the album's first single, “F*ck Off”. On August 19, F*ck Off was released onto iTunes. Pre-orders for Chemically Imbalanced came with the single and another song entitled R.A.D. (Roll a Doobie). The following three Tuesdays after "R.A.D." was released, three more singles were released, titled "Let's Do It Again", "Dopamine," featuring guest rappers such as Talib Kweli, Grafh, B-Real, and Trae tha Truth, and "Stand Up." On October 23, Billboard streamed the album via SoundCloud.

== Commercial performance ==
The album debuted at number 25 on the Billboard 200, selling 13,000 copies in its first week.

== Track listing ==
No.	Title	Producer(s)	Length
1.	"Nice 2 Be Back"	Alex 'AK' Kresovich	2:56
2.	"So Eazy"	SAP	3:31
3.	"Set It Off"	Scott Storch	2:47
4.	"House Party Cypher (Interlude)"		3:26
5.	"Let’s Do It Again"	Krunkadelic; Ben Billions	3:40
6.	"Turnt Up" (featuring Dizzy Wright)	Brix	5:03
7.	"Brim Low"	Supa Dups	3:52
8.	"Blunt Ride Cypher (Interlude)"		4:38
9.	"R.A.D. (Roll a Doobie)"	Kato	4:06
10.	"Chemically Imbalanced"	Scott Storch	3:55
11.	"Fuck Off"	ID Labs	3:24
12.	"Ohh Noo" (featuring Jarren Benton and Tech N9ne)	Brix	4:48
13.	"Label Office Cypher (Interlude)"		4:24
14.	"World on Fire" (featuring Jon Connor and Skrizzly Adams)	Skrizzly Adams	4:05
15.	"Stand Up"	Supa Dups; JG (co.)	3:24
16.	"Dopamine" (featuring Talib Kweli, Grafh, B-Real and Trae Tha Truth)	Prestige	5:55
17.	"Day in the Life" (featuring RyattFienix)	WLPWR for SupaHotBeats	4:05

Special expanded edition bonus tracks

No.	Title	Length
18.	"So Fly" (featuring Alandon)	2:38
19.	"Money"	3:50
20.	"Dinner and a Movie"	4:47
21.	"Take Over" (featuring Jitta on the Track)	4:09
