= Enterprise Earth =

American deathcore band

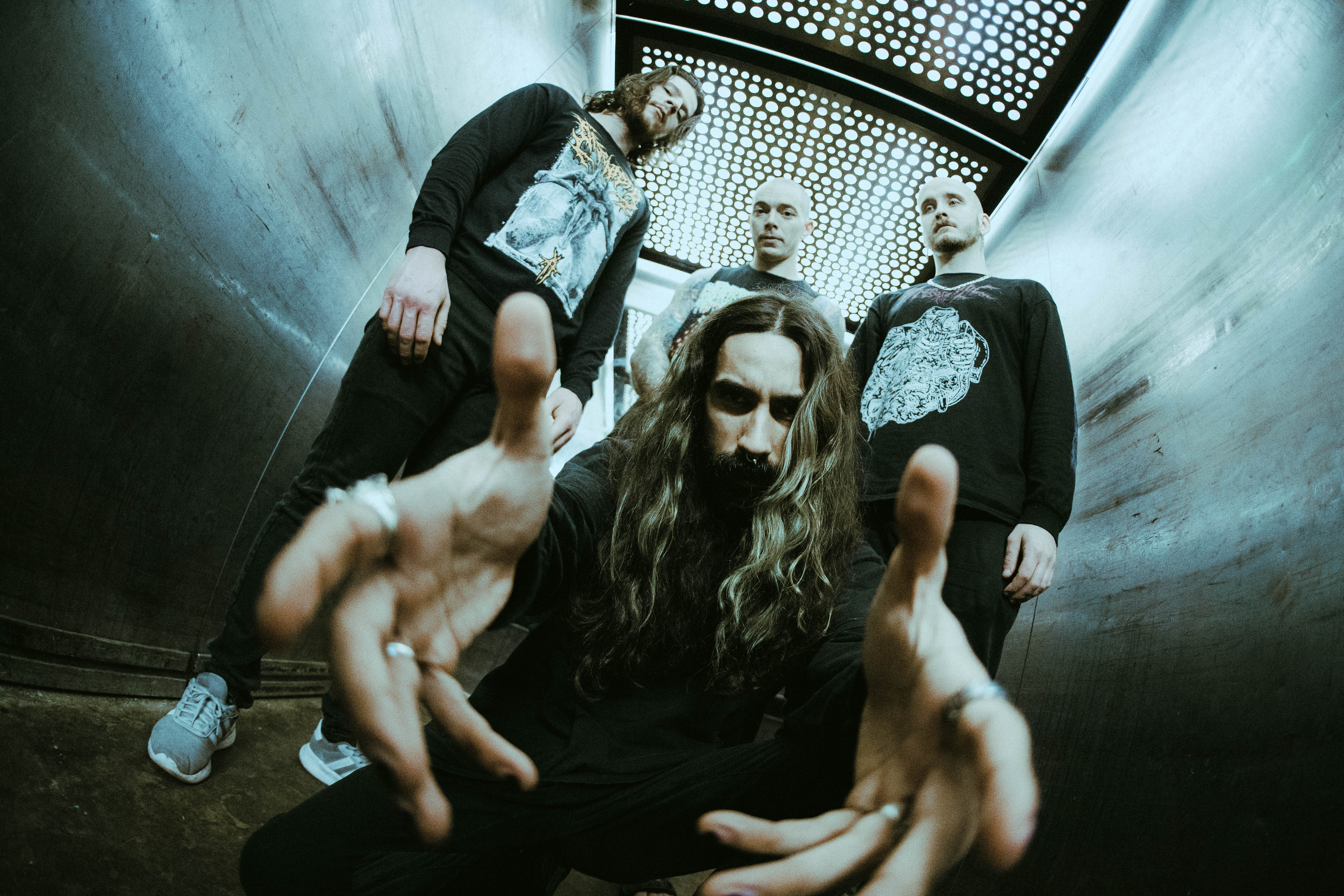
- Enterprise Earth in 2024

Background information
- Origin: Spokane, Washington, U.S.
- Genres: Deathcore; death metal; metalcore
- Years active: 2014–present
- Labels: eOne; Good Fight; Stay Sick; We Are Triumphant
- Members: Gabe Mangold; Travis Worland; Dakota Johnson; Aron Hetsko
- Past members: Brandon Zackey; Dan Watson; BJ Sampson; Cliff Wagle; Kevin Rogers; Conner Schneberger; Ryan Folden; Gordon McPherson; Will Garcia; Brian Moore; Michael Davidson; Aaron O'Toole; Yusef Johnson; Joel Omans; Rob Saireh
- Website: enterpriseearthband.com

Enterprise Earth is an American deathcore band from Spokane, Washington, formed in 2014 by former members Dan Watson, vocalist, and BJ Sampson, guitarist. Since the departure of Watson in 2022, no original members remain in the band, with guitarist Gabe Mangold being its longest tenured member since joining in 2017. As of January 23, 2025, Enterprise Earth is an independent band having parted ways with their previous label MNRK Music Group. Enterprise Earth's members are Travis Worland (vocals), Gabe Mongold (guitars and backing vocals), Dakota Johnson (bass and backing vocals), and Aron Hetsko (drums) as of October 14, 2025.

== History ==
Enterprise Earth was formed by Dan Watson, formerly of Infant Annihilator, and BJ Sampson, formerly of Takeover, in the late summer of 2014. The band name was inspired and attributed to Watson's research into the Illuminati and conspiracy theories. Enterprise Earth released their debut single and music video "Masquerade of Angels" on the label We Are Triumphant. On October 14, 2014, Enterprise Earth released their debut EP XXIII.

In April 2015, Enterprise Earth announced their first tour, the Death Take Me Home tour with King Conquer, Here Comes the Kraken, Adaliah, and Dealey Plaza. Here Comes the Kraken played all but the first show of the tour, Adaliah played shows from August 7 to August 30, Dealey Plaza played every show on the tour, and Enterprise Earth played shows from August 24 to the end of the tour. On the last date of the tour, guest bands also appeared: Lost Fortune, WVRM, Among Us, Worthy to Recognize, and Existence Has Failed. Also in April 2015, Enterprise Earth announced their departure from their label We Are Triumphant at the same time that they announced their new single "Transorbital Awakening". "Transorbital Awakening" was released as the first single from Patient Ø on April 24. It featured a guest guitar solo by Joel Omans of Rings of Saturn. The second single, "Amorphous", was released on June 6, which featured guest vocals by Adam Warren of Oceano. On June 10, 2015, the band announced that they had signed with Stay Sick Recordings, Attila frontman, Chris Fronzak's label. The third single,"Theophany", was released on August 21. On October 12, Stay Sick Recordings uploaded a music video for "Shallow Breath", featuring model Erin Leigh Pribyl. The final single, "Hollow Face" was released on November 10. A music video for the song "Amid Vultures" was released on May 25, 2016.

In November 2015, Enterprise Earth announced they would be playing the second half of The Sleep Disorder Tour (January 16–25, 2016) with Traitors. Enterprise Earth announced that on January 20 of [The] Sleep Disorder Tour, they would be playing alongside Kings, Purge, Endings, Beggars Clarity, and Destitute; whether these bands were on other dates is unknown. On December 11, Patient Ø was released. It reached No. 5 on Billboard's Heatseekers/Top New Artist Chart, No. 16 on their Independent Label Chart, and No. 54 on their Hard Music Chart. Enterprise Earth would even take part in the 2016 Summer Slaughter Tour. On July 15, 2016, the band released a single titled "This Hell, My Home".

Their second studio album Embodiment was released on April 14, 2017, and peaked at No. 6 on the Billboard Heatseekeers Chart.

On December 13, 2018, the band released a video for "He Exists", as an advance single to Luciferous, which was released through Entertainment One and Good Fight Music on April 5, 2019. Loudwire named it one of the 50 best metal albums of 2019. The Billboard "Emerging Artists" chart dated for April 20, 2019 placed Enterprise Earth at number 27. On May 20, 2019, the band released a live EP of them having a session performance with Audiotree Live.

On June 19, 2020, the band surprise released the Foundation of Bones EP. On September 10, 2021, the band announced their fourth album, The Chosen, would be due in January 2022, and also released its lead single "Where Dreams Are Broken". Shortly after, it was announced that frontman Dan Watson would be sitting out of the band's upcoming tours and would be replaced with live vocalist Travis Worland. On April 12, 2022, Watson announced he had departed the band. On May 2, touring vocalist Travis Worland was announced as the band's new permanent vocalist, and the band released their first single with him, "Psalm of Agony", the next month. In January 2023, the band released two more new singles with him titled "Death Magick" and "The World Without Us".

On October 11, 2023, the band announced their fifth album, Death: An Anthology, would be released on February 2, 2024. along with the release of the first single of the new album titled "King Of Ruination" featuring Ben Duerr from Shadow of Intent. Two more singles from the album would be released in late 2023 titled "The Reaper's Servant" featuring Spite's Darius Tehrani and "Casket of Rust". A music video for the track "Blood and Teeth" was released on February 2, 2024, coinciding with the album release.

On January 16, 2025, the band announced they would independently release a new EP on January 30 titled Descent Into Madness. They also released a music video for the song "I. The Descent" from the EP. A music video for the track "III. Shadows Below" was released on January 30, 2025, coinciding with the EP's release.

== Band members ==
Current

- Gabe Mangold – guitars, backing vocals (2017–present)
- Travis Worland – vocals (2022–present; live 2021–2022)
- Dakota Johnson – bass, backing vocals (2022–present; live 2021–2022)
- Aron Hetsko – drums (2024–present; live 2023–2024)

Live

- Sammy Morales – drums (2016)
- Josh Freeman – guitars (2016–2017)

Former

- Dan Watson – vocals (2014–2022)
- Byron James "BJ" Sampson – guitars (2014–2019)
- Cliff Wagle – guitars (2014–2016)
- Kevin Rogers – guitars (2014–2015)
- Conner Schneberger – bass (2014–2015)
- Ryan Folden – drums (2014–2015)
- Gordon McPherson – bass (2015–2017)
- Willow Garcia – guitars (2015–2016)
- Brian Moore – bass (2015)
- Michael Davidson – drums (2015)
- Aaron O'Toole – drums (2016–2019)
- Yusef Johnson – guitars (2016–2017)
- Joel Omans – guitars (2016)
- Rob Saireh – bass (2018–2021)
- Brandon Zackey – drums (2019–2024)

Timeline

== Discography ==
Studio albums

- Patient 0 (2015)
- Embodiment (2017)
- Luciferous (2019)
- The Chosen (2022)
- Death: An Anthology (2024)

EPs

- 23 (2014)
- Enterprise Earth on Audiotree Live (2019)
- Foundation of Bones (2020)
- Descent Into Madness (2025)

Singles

- "Masquerade of Angels" (2014)
- "Carol of the Bells" (2014)
- "Transorbital Awakening" (2015)
- "Amorphous" (2015)
- "Theophany" (2015)
- "This Hell, My Home" (2016)
- "Mortum Incarnatum" (2017)
- "Temptress" (2017)
- "Father of Abortion" (2017)
- "Only Hell Will Embrace the Damned" (2018)
- "He Exists" (2018)
- "Sleep Is for the Dead" (2019)
- "Where Dreams Are Broken" (2021)
- "Reanimate // Disintegrate" (2021)
- "Legends Never Die" (2021)
- "You Couldn't Save Me" (2022)
- "Psalm of Agony" (2022)
- "Death Magick" (2023)
- "The World Without Us" (2023)
- "King of Ruination (Feat. Ben Duerr)" (2023)
- "The Reaper's Servant (Feat. Darius Tehrani)" (2023)
- "Casket of Rust" (2023)
- "I. The Descent" (2025)
- "Slaves Shall Serve (Behemoth cover)" (2025)
- ”Neo-Promethean” (2026)

Music videos

Year	Song	Album	Director	Type
2014	"Masquerade of Angels"	XXIII EP	Dawson Scholz	Narrative
2015	"Shallow Breath"	Patient 0	Peter Doucette	Narrative
2016	"Amid Vultures"	Patient 0	Orie McGinness	Music Video
2016	"This Hell, My Home"	non-album single	Orie McGinness	Narrative
2017	"Never Forgive, Never Forget"	Embodiment	Michael Adams	Narrative
2017	"Deflesh to Unveil"	Embodiment	Michael Adams	Tour
2018	"He Exists"	Luciferous	Unknown	Music Video
2019	"We Are Immortal"	Luciferous	Burke Cullinane	Music Video
2019	"Sleep Is for the Dead"	Luciferous	Orie Mcginness	Music Video
2019	"The Failsafe Fallacy"	Luciferous	Orie Mcginness	Music Video
2020	"Scars of the Past"	Luciferous	Dylan Gould	Tour
2020	"Foundation of Bones"	Foundation of Bones EP	Dylan Gould	Music Video
2021	"Where Dreams Are Broken"	The Chosen	Burke Cullinane	Music Video
2021	"Reanimate // Disintegrate"	The Chosen	Burke Cullinane	Music Video
2022	"Psalm of Agony"	non-album single	Chris Klumpp	Music Video
2022	"You Couldn't Save Me"	The Chosen	Nicholas Chance	Tour
2023	"Death Magick"	non-album single	Kyle Hines	Music Video
2023	"The World Without Us"	non-album single	Kyle Hines	Performance
2023	"King Of Ruination (feat. Ben Duerr)"	Death: An Anthology	Nicholas Chance	Narrative
2023	"The Reaper's Servant (feat. Darius Tehrani)"	Death: An Anthology	Nicholas Chance	Performance
2023	"Casket Of Rust"	Death: An Anthology	Nicholas Chance	Music Video
2024	"Blood and Teeth"	Death: An Anthology	Nicholas Chance	Performance
2024	"I, Divine"	Death: An Anthology	Nicholas Chance	Music Video
2025	"I. The Descent"	Descent Into Madness EP	Nicholas Chance	Performance
2025	"III. Shadows Below"	Descent Into Madness EP	Nicholas Chance	Performance
2026	Neo-Promethean	non-album single	Enterprise Earth	Music Video
