= Broken Safety 2 =

Studio album by 40 Cal.
- Released: September 11, 2007
- Genre: East Coast hip hop; gangsta rap
- Length: 55:25
- Label: Diplomat; Koch
- Producer: 40 Cal. (exec.); Skeme Team (exec.); Doe Boy; The Bangaz; Tai Jason; Big Tyme; Shatek King

40 Cal. chronology
Broken Safety (2006)	Broken Safety 2 (2007)	The Yellow Tape (2008)

Professional ratings
Review scores
Source	Rating
AllMusic	3.5/5 stars
PopMatters	3/10 stars
RapReviews	7/10 stars
XXL	2/5 stars

Broken Safety 2 is the second studio album by American rapper 40 Cal. It is the sequel to his debut album Broken Safety. It was originally scheduled to be released in June 2007, but was instead released on September 11 that same year via Diplomat Records and Koch Records. It features guest spots by the Dipset.

The album was originally scheduled to include a limited-edition bonus DVD featuring Dipset footage & live performances, but the release was cancelled by the distributor.

The album's first single was "The Big Boys".

== Track listing ==
No.	Title	Writer(s)	Producer(s)	Length
1.	"40 Cals"	Antoine, Byrd	Doe Boy	2:32
2.	"Dip-Dip" (featuring Juelz Santana)	Antoine, Byrd, James	Doe Boy	3:16
3.	"Celebrity Hustla"	Antoine, Byrd	Doe Boy	3:47
4.	"Hostile Takeova" (featuring Hell Rell)	Barrett, Byrd, Mohammed	The Bangaz	2:47
5.	"The Big Boys" (featuring Jha Jha)	Antoine, Byrd, Handy	Doe Boy	3:58
6.	"Drama Season"	Antoine, Byrd	Doe Boy	4:05
7.	"Hi-Road" (featuring Rell)	Antoine, Byrd, Gerrell	Doe Boy	3:30
8.	"Since U Been Away"	Barrett, Byrd, Sinclair	The Bangaz	3:29
9.	"Getting By"	Antoine, Byrd	Doe Boy	3:27
10.	"Skit" (featuring Murph & Levi)	Byrd, Rascoe, Wanzer		2:25
11.	"Give Me Some Head"	Antoine, Byrd	Doe Boy	3:12
12.	"Close Ur Eyes"	Barrett, Byrd, Sinclair	The Bangaz	3:22
13.	"Stick 'Em" (featuring Cam'ron & J.R. Writer)	Brito, Byrd, Giles, King	Shatek King	4:24
14.	"New Anthem"	Brutus, Byrd, Holmes	Tai Jason	3:01
15.	"Neva Neva" (featuring A-Mafia & RU Spits)	Brutus, Byrd, Holmes	Big Tyme	2:50
16.	"Dead Poets Society"	Brutus, Byrd, Holmes	Tai Jason	2:34
17.	"Chickens in Da Coupe" (featuring Sudaboss)	Antoine, Byrd, Glover		2:46
Total length:				55:25

== Personnel ==
- Calvin Alan Byrd – main artist, executive producer
- LaRon Louis James – featured artist (track 2)
- Durrell Mohammad – featured artist (track 4)
- Natoya Handy – featured artist (track 5)
- Gerrell Gaddis – featured artist (track 7)
- Cameron Ezike Giles – featured artist (track 13)
- Juan Rusty Brito – featured artist (track 13)
- A. Holmes – featured artist (track 15)
- Ru Spits – featured artist (track 15)
- Su Da Boss – featured artist (track 17)
- Doe Boy – producer (tracks: 1-3, 5-7, 9, 11)
- Bangaz – producer (tracks: 4, 8, 12)
- Tai Jason – producer (tracks: 14, 16)
- Shatek King – producer (track 13)
- Big-Tyme – producer (track 15)
- Skeme Team – executive producer
- Arnold Mischkulnig – mastering
- K. "Cool" Shillingford – A&R
- Seth Kushner – cover photo

== Chart history ==
Chart (2007)	Peak position
US Billboard 200	151
US Top R&B/Hip-Hop Albums (Billboard)	27
US Top Rap Albums (Billboard)	12
US Independent Albums (Billboard)	20
US Heatseekers Albums (Billboard)	3
