= Broken Safety =

Studio album by 40 Cal.
- Released: August 8, 2006
- Genre: East Coast hip hop; gangsta rap
- Length: 1:04:25
- Label: Money Maker; X-Ray; Cleopatra
- Producer: Rek Beats; Charlemagne; Adam; Dame Grease; Doe Boy; K1 Mil; Raw Beats; Straight Bangaz; The Heatmakerz

40 Cal. chronology
Broken Safety (2006)	Broken Safety 2 (2007)

Broken Safety is the debut studio album by the American rapper 40 Cal. from Harlem, New York. It was released on August 8, 2006, via X-Ray Records, an imprint of Cleopatra Records, and features guest appearances from Akon, Bezel, Freekey Zekey, J.R. Writer, A-Mafia, Young Ace, Rod Man and Su Da Boss. This is the first release by a member of The Diplomats to not be released under Diplomat Records.

== Track listing ==
No.	Title	Producer(s)	Length
1.	"Broken Safety"	Doe Boy	3:25
2.	"Worried" (featuring Sudaboss)	Raw Beats	2:41
3.	"Pyrexx Vision/Angel Dust"	Rek Beats; The Heatmakerz	4:48
4.	"Crack"	K1 Mil	2:41
5.	"Runnin' This Rap Shit" (featuring J.R. Writer)	Rek Beats	4:11
6.	"Real Bitch" (featuring Freekey Zekey)	Rek Beats	2:21
7.	"Survivor" (featuring Akon)	Rek Beats	2:43
8.	"Weed Song"	Charlemagne	3:04
9.	"T.V. Show"	Rek Beats	3:08
10.	"Go Get Ya Guns" (featuring Rod Man)	Rek Beats	4:03
11.	"Quiet Sounds"	Charlemagne	3:25
12.	"You Know Who It Is" (featuring Bezel)	Dame Grease	2:52
13.	"Fuck It All"	Rek Beats	3:08
14.	"Click Clack" (featuring A-Mafia)	Straight Bangaz	3:58
15.	"Think I'm Not Gangsta"	Rek Beats	3:17
16.	"Sounds Like"	Rek Beats	2:50
17.	"Be Easy"	Adam	1:28
18.	"It's 40"	Rek Beats	3:05
19.	"Sam Scared"	Rek Beats	2:51
20.	"Dear Fan" (featuring Young Ace)	Rek Beats	4:26
Total length:			1:04:25

== Chart history ==
Chart (2006)	Peak position
US Top R&B/Hip-Hop Albums (Billboard)	81
