= Fables from a Mayfly: What I Tell You Three Times Is True =

Studio album by Fair to Midland
- Released: June 12, 2007
- Studios: Metalworks Studios, Mississauga, Ontario
- Genres: Alternative metal, progressive metal, art rock
- Length: 47:41
- Label: Serjical Strike/Universal Republic
- Producer: David Bottrill

Fair to Midland chronology
Inter.funda.stifle (2004)	Fables from a Mayfly: What I Tell You Three Times Is True (2007)	Arrows and Anchors (2011)

Singles from Fables from a Mayfly: What I Tell You Three Times Is True
- 1. "Dance of the Manatee" Released: March 13, 2007; 2. "Tall Tales Taste Like Sour Grapes" Released: October 2, 2007

Fables from a Mayfly: What I Tell You Three Times Is True is the third full-length album by alternative metal band Fair to Midland. It is the band's major label debut after two self-released albums. Fables from a Mayfly was released on June 12, 2007, with its two singles "Dance of the Manatee" and "Tall Tales Taste Like Sour Grapes" both charting in the U.S. rock charts.

== Background ==
After their independent debut album in late 2001, The Carbon Copy Silver Lining, and their second album, 2004's Inter.funda.stifle, the band toured extensively to promote the albums, building up a fanbase in the Dallas, Texas Deep Ellum music scene. However, attempts to branch out into bigger music scenes, such as Los Angeles, proved futile for the band. A lack of progress, combined with increasing costs of self-funding all of their efforts, and Sudderth and Campbells college aspirations, led the band to contemplate breaking up. Just as the band was seriously discussing a break up, they received a call from Serj Tankian, frontman of American alternative metal band System of a Down. Their albums and live shows had caught his attention, and showed interest in signing them to his vanity label Serjical Strike, on Universal Republic Records. This rejuvenated the band's confidence, and they signed on in April 2006, starting work on a new album shortly after.

== Writing and recording ==
From the start, the band chose to revisit many of the songs from Inter.funda.stifle which they felt could benefit from a professional music producer and bigger production budget. The band chose to work with music producer David Bottrill, who had previously worked on Tool's albums Ænima and Lateralus, and Mudvayne's The End of All Things to Come, to create "a big, epic feel" to the album. Tankian would also be present during the sessions, advising and acting as an executive producer. Bottrill affected the band's songwriting process; while in the past, a single band member would write and present their own songs, and then orchestrate the instruments around it, whereas Botrrill would have them write the songs together. This led to less "dead ends", where singular members would write a song by themselves only to not be on the same page as the rest of the band, resulting in wasted time and material. The band wrote "four or five" of the songs in the studio with Bottrill, including their second single, "Tall Tales Taste Like Sour Grapes", and the rewrite of "A Wolf Descends Upon the Spanish Sahara". The band spend four weeks in pre-production, writing new tracks and polishing ones chosen to rework from Inter.funda.stifle, and took another two and a half months recording the album. Only one to two of the weeks were spent on vocal takes, of which lead vocalist Darroh Sudderth found especially stressful, even losing hair in the process. Overall, the process of making the album took roughly six months.

About half of the songs from their prior independent release, Inter.funda.stifle, were reevaluated and re-recorded in the Fables From a Mayfly sessions: "Dance of the Manatee", "Vice/Versa", "A Seafarer's Knot", "The Walls of Jericho", "Kyla Cries Cologne", "When the Bough Breaks", and "Upgrade^Brigade". The track "Orphan Anthem 86" was originally to be re-recorded for the album as well, but the sessions were deemed "too experimental", and the idea was dropped. The band demoed early versions of the tracks "Musical Chairs" and "Pour the Coal to'er" during the Fables From a Mayfly sessions, but ultimately left them off the album to fully develop later into songs for their next album, Arrows and Anchors. Another demo, "Proof is a Punchline", would be dropped from the album and not revisited for the future album.

In an interview with Susan from MetalStorm.net on July 7, 2012, Sudderth commented on the lyric writing he did for this album:

I put together just a whole book of colloquialisms and turns of phrases and all kinds of little fun words like that, because I've always been a big fan of stuff like that, too. So, I'll write a lot of stuff and kind of refer to that and replace things sometimes if it fits or make sense.

Yeah, I spent like two weeks before we went to Toronto to make that record, it's basically like my colloquialism/phrase/cliché dictionary that I just divided up into sections. You know under "people" I'd put like "busy bees" or "worry warts" or "doubting Thomas" or stuff like that, little characters like that. Then, also, adverbs, little prepositional phrases that might suit some of those things. I just revert to that if I want to get some weird stuff.

— Darroh Sudderth

== Composition and sound ==
Even during the recording process, the band felt that they were "still trying to find their sound", although the band often accounted that they were inspired to create an "epic" sound for the album, while working with Bottrill.

== Release and promotion ==
The album's release was delayed a few times, initially scheduled for release in April 2007, before being delayed back to its final date, June 12, 2007. Through the recording process, the band would release a series of "video diary" vides to their Myspace account, documenting the creation process. The band toured extensively throughout 2007 and 2008 in support of the album, performing at major concerts such as Coachella, Rock am Ring, and Rock im Park. They opened for bands such as Rage Against the Machine, Smashing Pumpkins, Queens of the Stone Age, Muse, and Serj Tankian's solo band. Notably, they even teamed up Tankian at times for a live improvisational version of their song "The Walls of Jericho".

Two versions of the album were released, the "original version", and the "international version". The international version of the album is missing the instrumentals that appear between listed songs, with the exception of "Ozymandius" after "Say When". It also does not feature the pregap hidden track "Tibet". It does, however, feature the original Inter.funda.stifle version of "Orphan Anthem 86" as a bonus track.

== Reception ==
Professional ratings
Review scores
Source	Rating
AllMusic	3.5/5 stars
Alternative Addiction	4/5 stars
Daily Dischord	3.5/5 stars
IGN	(8.8/10)
Metal Perspective	8.5/10 stars
Sputnikmusic	4.5/5 stars

The album has been generally well received by critics. IGN praised the band's ability to create a unique sound, describing that "throughout the album, Fair To Midland seems to defy popular recording technique and songwriting style. Yet, in doing so, they create a sound that is so incredibly mesmerizing that a listener who is well-educated on musical styles will be able to pick out elements of a variety of popular styles" and concluded that it was "easily a frontrunner for album of the year" in 2007.

== Track listing ==
All lyrics are written by Darroh Sudderth; all music is composed by Fair to Midland.

Hidden track
No.	Title	Length
0.	"Tibet (pregap hidden track)"	1:12

No.	Title	Length
1.	"Dance of the Manatee"	4:11
2.	"Kyla Cries Cologne" / "Pre-Versa"	4:01
3.	"Vice/Versa"	3:55
4.	"The Wife, the Kids, and the White Picket Fence"	3:29
5.	"April Fools and Eggmen" / "Ciperion"	4:44
6.	"A Seafarer's Knot"	4:11
7.	"A Wolf Descends Upon the Spanish Sahara"	4:13
8.	"Walls of Jericho"	3:46
9.	"Tall Tales Taste Like Sour Grapes"	4:02
10.	"Upgrade^Brigade" / "When the Bough Breaks"	5:17
11.	"Say When" / "Ozymandius"	5:52
12.	"An Honest Con Man" (iTunes Bonus Track)	4:01

International release
No.	Title	Length
1.	"Dance of the Manatee"	4:11
2.	"Kyla Cries Cologne"	3:36
3.	"Vice/Versa"	3:56
4.	"The Wife, the Kids, and the White Picket Fence"	3:30
5.	"April Fools and Eggmen"	3:16
6.	"A Seafarer's Knot"	4:12
7.	"A Wolf Descends Upon the Spanish Sahara"	4:13
8.	"Walls of Jericho"	3:46
9.	"Tall Tales Taste Like Sour Grapes"	4:02
10.	"Upgrade^Brigade"	3:54
11.	"Say When" / "Ozymandius"	5:55
12.	"Orphan Anthem '86" (Original Demo)	5:03
Total length:		47:28

== Personnel ==
Band

- Darroh Sudderth – vocals
- Cliff Campbell – guitar
- Jon Dicken – bass guitar
- Brett Stowers – drums
- Matt Langley – keys

Additional musicians

- Claudio Vena – viola and violin ("Tall Tales Taste Like Sour Grapes", "Walls of Jericho")

Production

- David Bottrill – producer, mix engineer
- Serj Tankian – executive producer
- David Stephan – assistant producer, Pro Tools
- Ian Bodzasi – engineer
- Bob Ludwig – mastering

Artwork

- James Riches – album art

== Chart performance ==
Album

Chart (2007)	Peak position
US Billboard 200	137
US Billboard Top Heatseekers	2

Singles

Year	Title	Peak chart positions
Year	Title	Billboard Mainstream Rock Tracks
2007	"Dance of the Manatee"	19
2007	"Tall Tales Taste Like Sour Grapes"	38
