= Descent into Madness =

2025 EP by Enterprise Earth

EP by Enterprise Earth
- Released: January 30, 2025
- Genre: Deathcore
- Length: 24:12
- Label: Self-released
- Producer: Gabe Mangold

Enterprise Earth chronology
Death: An Anthology (2024)	Descent into Madness (2025)

Singles from Descent into Madness
- 1. "I. The Descent" Released: January 16, 2025

Descent into Madness: The Instrumentals
- Artwork used for the Instrumental edition cover

Descent into Madness is the third EP by American deathcore band Enterprise Earth, released independently on January 30, 2025. It is the band's first release to be released independently. It is also the band's first release to feature drummer Aron Hetsko who joined the band in August 2024, replacing Brandon Zackey who left to join Whitechapel.

== Style ==
While on this EP the band still mixes deathcore with thrash, djent, and melodic death metal, it pursued a more extreme style with less of those influences. The band jettisoned most of the soaring melodies and sung vocals, opting instead for "sheer brutality".

== Reception ==
Professional ratings
Review scores
Source	Rating
Boolin Tunes	8/10
Metallerium	8.5/10

Dan Southall of Hot Metal Magazine said of the recording that "this recording doesn’t set out to create something new or fresh, but it does serve as a new beginning of sorts for the band." He commented that his music taste does include some deathcore, and "sometimes you have to let go of the elitist outlook and just have a moshing good time." Florian Schaffer of Vampster said that for this recording, the band concocted a more cohesive and uncompromising sound compared to prior releases. Hellbiter of Metallerium rated the EP eight-point-five out of ten, summarizing it as "deathcore with everything necessary for one who enters." Nicholas Hayley of Boolin Tunes rated the EP eight out of ten, stating "By and large, it proved difficult for me to find anything negative to say about this one."

== Track listing ==
Descent into Madness track listing
No.	Title	Length
1.	"I. The Descent"	3:46
2.	"II. Words in Whispers"	3:13
3.	"III. Shadows Below"	4:22
4.	"IV. Chasms of Hell"	5:53
5.	"V. Enough"	1:45
6.	"VI. Shapeshifter"	5:13
Total length:		24:12

== Personnel ==
Enterprise Earth

- Travis Worland – vocals
- Gabe Mangold – guitars, production, mastering, mixing, engineering
- Dakota Johnson – bass
- Aron Hetsko – drums

Other personnel

- Jason Suecof – drum engineering
- Chris Maxwell – cover art
