= Egyptrixx =

Canadian electronic musician

Egyptrixx (born David Psutka) is a Canadian electronic musician from Toronto, Ontario. Psutka also releases music under the names "ACT!" and "Ceramic TL", is a member of experimental folk project Anamai, and works as a studio producer and composer

== Biography ==
Egyptrixx's debut full-length album, Bible Eyes, was released in March 2011. Psutka stated in an interview that Bible Eyes was created as a tribute to his great-grandmother.

In 2012, Egyptrixx began a side project with former Thrush Hermit member Ian McGettigan, called Hiawatha. The duo's debut album, Language, was released on September 25, 2012 through Last Gang Records. In 2012 McGettigan was replaced by Cameron Gilpin, formerly of Bad Robot(s) Evil Doer.

Psutka released the 2nd Egyptrixx album entitled "A/B til Infinity" in 2013 - the album was a multimedia collaboration with German visual artist ANF and received critical acclaim upon release. The album emphasized a minimalist or deconstructionist approach. Psutka announced his new label "Halocline Trance" and the third Egyptrixx LP entitled "Transfer of Energy [Feelings of Power], which will be the label's first release. Psutka has also worked on various other projects as a studio producer.

Psutka retired the Egyptrixx project and announced an album under the name ACT! in 2018. The album, "Universalist" was released on Halocline Trance in July, 2018.

With his various projects, Psutka has toured extensively and performed at Sónar, Roskilde Festival, Mutek, CTM Festival and more.

In 2019, Halocline Trance released the debut album of Chinese-born visual artist, Xuan Ye. The album, "XI XI 息息" compiled sound improvisations from a three year period of performance. Boomkat called it an "Intriguing debut album of disjointed, abstract computer music and free improv"

== Discography ==
=== Albums ===
- Bible Eyes (Night Slugs, 2011)
- A/B Til Infinity (Last Gang Records, Night Slugs, 2013)
- Transfer of Energy [Feelings of Power] (Halocline Trance, 2015)
- Pure, Beyond Reproach (Halocline Trance, 2017)

=== ACT! ===
- Universalist (Halocline Trance, 2018)

=== Ceramic TL ===
- Sign of the Cross Every Mile to the Border (Halocline Trance, 2016)
- (with Ipek Gorgun) Perfect Lung (Halocline Trance, 2017)

=== Hiawatha ===
- Language (Last Gang, 2012)

=== Anamai ===
- Sallows (Buzz, 2015)
- What Mountain (Halocline Trance, 2017)
- Amnesia is Eternal Optimism (Halocline Trance, 2017)
- Dream Baby (Halocline Trance, 2019)

=== EPs ===
- Just Say Really (Idiot House, 2009)
- Summer of Love (Electrostimulation, 2009)
- Battle for North America (RAMP, 2010)
- The Only Way Up EP (Night Slugs, 2010)
- Liberation Front (Night Slugs, 2011)

=== appears on ===
- Kuedo - Assertion of a Surrounding Presence (Knives, 2015)

=== Remixes ===
- Brodinski - Arnold Classics [Egyptrixx remix] (Grizzly, 2010)
- Starkey - Robot Hands [Egyptrixx remix] (Civil, 2011)
- Massive Attack - Hymn of the Big Wheel [Egyptrixx remix] (Virgin, 2012)

=== Compilations ===
- Night Slugs All Stars Vol.1 (Night Slugs, 2011)
- Modeselektor pres. Modeselektion vol.2 (Monkeytown, 2012)
- Night Slugs All Stars Vol.2 (Night Slugs, 2013)
