= Anew Revolution =

American metal band

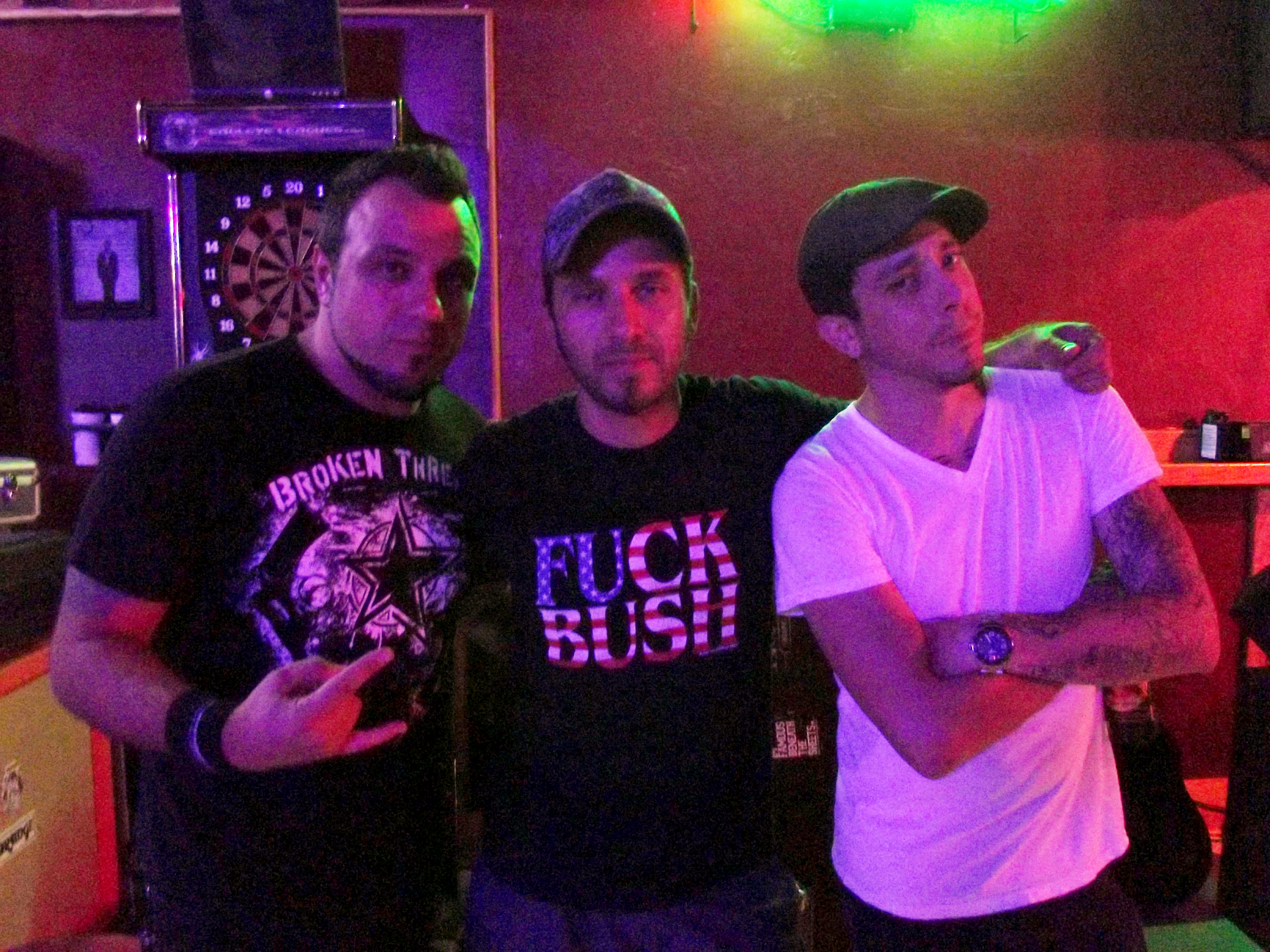
- Anew Revolution in 2012

Background information
- Origin: Austin, Texas, U.S.
- Genres: Nu metal; alternative metal; hard rock
- Years active: 2005–2014
- Label: Koch/E1
- Members: Joey Duenas; Frank "Frankie" Salvaggio; Rob Urbani
- Past members: Shaun Stockton; Jay Frederick; Joe Fox

Anew Revolution (often shortened to ANR) was an American metal band from Austin, Texas.

== History ==
Anew Revolution was formed by ex-Ünloco frontman Joey Duenas and includes Frank "Frankie" Salvaggio and Rob Urbani, former members of Slaves on Dope. The band released a five-track self-released EP in 2005 featuring the tracks "Cave In", "Rise", "Let Go", "Saddest Song", and "Pieces". In 2007 the band recorded several tracks performed at a live show held at The Machine Shop in Flint, Michigan, and released a four-track CD which included new tracks "Bite My Tongue", "Savior", and "Blister & Burn". Anew Revolution officially signed a worldwide record deal with Koch Records in late August 2007.

=== Rise (2008–2010) ===
On April 15, 2008, ANR released their first full-length album, Rise, produced by Mudrock (Godsmack, Avenged Sevenfold). Tighter, heavier and more dynamic than the previous recordings, Rise features crowd favorites such as "Done", "Rise", "Generation".

=== iMerica (2010–2012) ===
Anew Revolution released their second studio record entitled iMerica May 18, 2010, via E1 Music. Produced by Ben Schigel, a musician, record producer and vocalist from the band Switched who has produced for such bands as Drowning Pool, Walls of Jericho, Chimaira and many more. This album was a graduation, of sorts, for Anew Revolution, Salvaggio saying, "We always project ourselves as an intense, driving band live. When we first started, we were finding our identity, from the EP to the first album, which was us finding our pocket. The birth of this album is where we are going to go and we know we can keep going". iMerica featured a darker side to ANR with the crowd anthem "Head Against The Wall", and intense, darker sounding tracks like "Crucify" and "Social Suicide"

=== New music (2012–2014) ===
In May 2012, Anew Revolution started a Kickstarter campaign to finance a new studio album, videos, artworks and other costs without having to rely on record labels. Surpassing their initial goal of $3,000 they raised a total amount of $5,352.

In July 2012, rewards were sent to Kickstarter backers including the new acoustic EP Unplugged, several unreleased tracks and autographed merchandise. The unreleased songs included "Blister & Burn", "Creep", "Bite My Tongue" as well as "Dead and Crazy".

On November 10, 2013, ANR announced to release their new album in 2014. On August 4, 2014, the band reported to have finished work on new songs. Four songs were distributed digitally by email to Kickstarter backers only.

1. "Crazy" – 3:11
2. "Slow" – 3:51
3. "My Reality" – 3:17
4. "Haunt" – 3:48

To date, there has not been word about a public release or hard copies. A full new album has not been finished.

== Members ==
- Joey Duenas – vocals, guitar (2005–2014)
- Frank "Frankie" Salvaggio – bass, backing vocals (2005–2014)
- Rob Urbani – drums (2005–2014)

Past members

- Shaun Stockton – guitar (2005–2010)
- Jay Frederick – guitar (2010–2012)
- Joe Fox – (2012)

== Discography ==
- Revolution (EP, 2005)
- Live at the Machine Shop! (EP, 2007)
- Rise (2008)
- iMerica (2010)
- Unplugged (EP, 2012)
- New Songs (Kickstarter backers only, 2014)

== Touring history ==
- "Holiday Hangover" with Soulicit and Anchored (Winter 2012)
- "Under the Skin of Angels Tour" with Filter & Saliva (Summer 2011)
- Drowning Pool, Pop Evil, Trust Company (Spring 2011)
- "Hard Drive Live Tour" with Sevendust, 10 Years, and Since October (Fall 2010)
- Volbeat (Summer 2010)
- Hellyeah (Winter 2010)
- Switched (Spring 2006)
- Past tours: Nonpoint, 12 Stones, Ill Nino, Otep, Kittie, Hed PE, Dope, Taproot.
