= Fair to Midland =

American rock band

- Origin: Sulphur Springs, Texas, U.S.
- Genres: Alternative metal, progressive rock, progressive metal
- Years active: 1998–2013
- Labels: FTF, Serjical Strike, E1
- Members: Darroh Sudderth; Cliff Campbell; Nathin Seals; Jason Pintler; Brett Stowers; Matt Langley; Jon Dicken; Ryan Collier; Logan Kennedy

Fair to Midland was an American alternative metal band based in Texas. They produced two self-released albums before signing to Serjical Strike Records, Serj Tankian's vanity label at Universal Republic. There, they released their only major record label album, Fables from a Mayfly, in 2007. While the album broke into the Billboard 200, they eventually parted ways with Serjical Strike and later released their fourth album Arrows and Anchors in July 2011. Tentative plans for a fifth album had been discussed at the end of the Arrows and Anchors touring cycle, but the band became inactive in 2013.

== History ==
=== Formation and independent releases (1998–2005) ===
Fair to Midland was formed in 1998 by friends Andrew Darroh Sudderth and Cliff Campbell, both of Sulphur Springs, Texas. Sudderth originally started as the band's bassist, but switched to be the band's lead vocalist after rounding out the band with more members, namely Nathin Seals on bass and Jason Pintler on drums. After their independent debut album in late 2001, The Carbon Copy Silver Lining, Pintler left the band and was replaced by Brett Stowers. For their second album, 2004's Inter.funda.stifle, keyboardist Matt Langley, who was a guest musician on the first album, officially joined the band. The album was recorded as a quintet, and after release, the band toured extensively to promote the albums, building up a fanbase in the Dallas, Texas Deep Ellum music scene. However, attempts to branch out into bigger music scenes, such as Los Angeles, proved futile for the band. In 2005, Seals left the group as well. While he was replaced by Jon Dicken, still, a lack of progress, combined with increasing costs of self-funding all of their efforts, and Sudderth and Campbells college aspirations, led the band to contemplate breaking up. Just as the band was seriously discussing a break up, they received a call from Serj Tankian, frontman of American hard rock band System of a Down. Their albums and live shows had caught his attention, and showed interest in signing them to his vanity label Serjical Strike, on Universal Republic Records. This rejuvenated the band's confidence, and they signed on in April 2006, starting work on a new album shortly after.

=== Fables from a Mayfly (2006–2008) ===
Shortly after signing to the Serjical Strike label, The Drawn and Quartered EP was released, featuring demo and live tracks from inter.funda.stifle, and a mini-documentary titled The Drawn and Quartered Kinescope, which served as an introduction of the band, including interviews and past concert footage. Meanwhile, the band worked on recording their third album with music producer David Bottrill. For it, the band chose to rerecord many of the songs from inter.funda.stifle which they felt could benefit from a professional music producer and bigger production budget. After a few minor delays, the album, entitled, Fables From a Mayfly: What I Tell You Three Times Is True, was released on June 12, 2007.

The band toured extensively throughout 2007 and 2008 in support of the album, performing at major concerts such as Coachella, Rock am Ring, and Rock im Park. They opened for bands such as Rage Against the Machine, Smashing Pumpkins, Queens of the Stone Age, Dir En Grey, Muse, and Serj Tankian's solo band. Notably, they even teamed up Tankian at times for a live improvisational version of their song "The Walls of Jericho". Between 100 and 150 shows were played in support of the album in 2007 alone.

Fair to Midland were the winners of the Dallas Observer Music Award in the Best Metal category for both 2007 and 2008.

=== Arrows & Anchors (2009–2012) ===
In August 2008, Fair to Midland began writing their fourth studio album. By October, Stowers stated that the band had so far written about 4–6 songs that were in "various states of completion". He also wrote that the band wanted to take their time and release the record when it's done. In November, the band announced they had signed a record deal with E1 music, and that they were aiming for an early 2011 release date. Stowers stated the album would go in a darker and more cynical direction, as a result of the grueling two year touring schedule in support of their prior album.

On January 9, 2010, the band was in an accident, temporarily suspending touring and delaying recording. The band crashed and flipped their van and trailer. While the band were largely not seriously injured, it left much of their gear destroyed. Four days later the band released a short video involving post-accident footage, entitled "FWIW", standing for "For What It's Worth", which included a short clip of a studio demo of a new song called "A Loophole in Limbo".

The band continued to work on the album into 2011 with music producer Joe Barresi. By March, they had revealed the title, Arrows and Anchors, and in April, they released the first single, "Musical Chairs", on iTunes. In May, the studio version of "Amarillo Sleeps on My Pillow" was offered for free download on the band's website. The album was released on July 12, 2011.

On October 26, it was announced that Jon Dicken had decided to leave the band, with Ryan Collier, previously with Opus Dai, was announced as his touring replacement. A month later, on November 26, Brett Stowers announced that he had left the band as well, with Logan Kennedy being his replacement. The band pushed forward, releasing their first DVD, Welcome to the Dirt in November, consisting mainly of band shots and fan footage of live shows. The profit from this release helped fund a professional video recording of the band's show at The Machine Shop in Flint on December 17, which was later released on the band's first widely released DVD, Live at the Machine Shop in March 2012. On October 9 the band announced the release of their second DVD, combined with an audio CD, Live at Andy's Bar, consisting of footage of an acoustic live set performed by the band in March 2012, which was released on November 12.

=== Breakup (2013) ===
As of September 2012, the band had finished touring in support of Arrows and Anchors, and announced intentions of creating a fifth album. The band intended on starting by finishing some material left over from their prior album. However, as of early 2013, all communications from the band's websites and social media ceased. Stowers, who had left the band in 2011, has been the only party to discuss the band stating that all he knew was that, at his time of leaving, the band had accumulated substantial debt, was without a label, and members had scattered across the entire country.

== Musical style and influences ==
Progressive rock has commonly been used as a term to describe the band's sound by critics. Keyboardist Matt Langley described his stance on this:

Not the way most people define "prog." "Prog" suggests to me a band whose primary focus is mad technical skill with their instruments. All in Fair to Midland strive to play well (and in my opinion, succeed), but in that respect we're certainly no match for, for example, Dream Theater. However, there are those who expand the definition to include bands whose focus may or may not be less on the technical and more about experimental instrumentation, voicings, unusual parts and changes … by that amended definition, I suppose we'd fit into some people's idea of the prog rock mold. Either way is fine with me.

He also cited the band A Perfect Circle as an inspiration for the "non-technical" progressive rock sound. Guitarist Cliff Campbell expanded on the band's influences, stating,

We have diverse interests and influences, collectively and individually, from rock/metal, to classical/baroque, to country/western and folk, to industrial and electronic, and we like to draw from all of them. We simply use whatever instrumentation we think is right to create the feeling we’re looking for in each track. Sometimes it’s banjo and marxophone, sometimes hyper-saturated guitar and sawtooth synth… The five of us being so different as musicians, I’m not sure we could make a simple record if we tried.

He also stated that primary lyricist and vocalist Darroh Sudderth "is a fan of dark, antiquated children’s stories" and that this inspiration of "The childlike imagery and sound alternating with the dark, heavy, aggressive parts" was a defining feature of their sound.

== Band members ==
Final line-up

- Darroh Sudderth – lead vocals (1998–2013)
- Cliff Campbell – guitar, backing vocals (1998–2013)
- Matt Langley – keyboards, backing vocals (2002–2013)

Former members

- Nathin Seals – bass, backing vocals (1998–2005)
- Jason Pintler – drums (1998–2001)
- Brett Stowers – percussion (1998-2001), drums (2001–2011)
- Jon Dicken – bass (2005–2011)

Former touring musicians

- Ryan Collier – bass (2011–2013)
- Logan Kennedy – drums (2011–2013)

Timeline

== Discography ==
Studio albums

- The Carbon Copy Silver Lining (2001)
- inter.funda.stifle (2004)
- Fables from a Mayfly: What I Tell You Three Times Is True (2007)
- Arrows and Anchors (2011)

EPs

- The Drawn and Quartered EP (2006)

DVDs

- Welcome to the Dirt (2011)
- Live at the Machine Shop (2012)
- Live at Andy's Bar (2012)

Singles

Year	Song	US Active Rock	US Main.	Album
2007	"Dance of the Manatee"	17	19	Fables from a Mayfly
2007	"Tall Tales Taste Like Sour Grapes"	37	38	Fables from a Mayfly
2011	"Musical Chairs"	41	—	Arrows and Anchors
2011	"Amarillo Sleeps on My Pillow"	—	—	Arrows and Anchors

== Awards and nominations ==
Year	Award	Category	Result
2007	Dallas Observer	Best Metal category	Won
2008	Dallas Observer	Best Metal category	Won
2009	Dallas Observer	Best Rock category	Nominated
2010	Dallas Observer	Best Metal category	Won
