= Bear Mountain (band) =

Canadian indie band

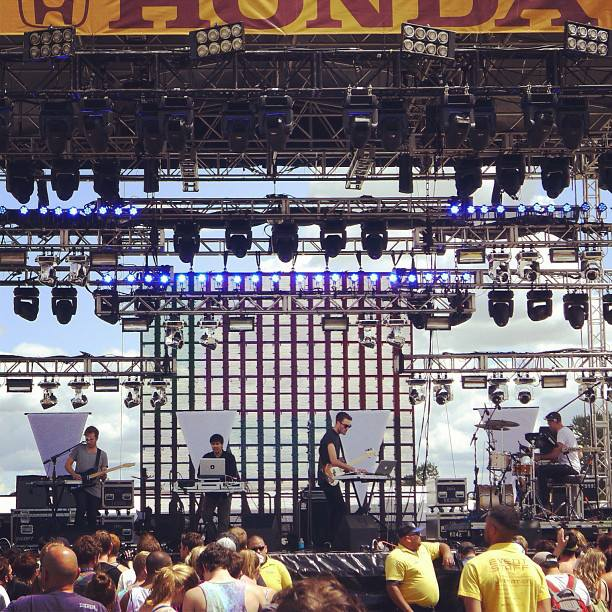

Background information
- Origin: Vancouver, British Columbia, Canada
- Genres: Indie, Dance, Alternative, Electronic
- Years active: 2012-2018
- Labels: Last Gang Records
- Members: Ian Bevis; Greg Bevis; Kenji Rodriguez; Kyle Statham

Bear Mountain was a Canadian indie band from Vancouver, British Columbia. They released their first album XO on Last Gang Records in May 2013. Bear Mountain have toured as direct support for Bloc Party, Cut Copy, Hot Chip, MS MR and have played major festivals including Lollapalooza, The Governor's Ball, Sasquatch! Music Festival, Osheaga and Austin City Limits.

After a successful showcase at SXSW 2013, Billboard wrote that "The fact they could catch so much attention says something about the potential and staying power of their music."

== History ==
The group was originally formed as a solo project by Ian Bevis of the band Top Less Gay Love Tekno Party. After playing several shows solo as Bear Mountain, Bevis invited fellow University of Victoria student Kyle Statham to join the band. The pair wrote and recorded their debut album XO in their home studio, and self-released the EP in August 2012. Initial reception for the EP was positive, with taste-maker blogs The Fader and Consequence of Sound praising the sound.

Ian's twin, Greg Bevis, and Kenji Rodriguez were added to the Bear Mountain lineup, with Bevis playing drums and keyboards, and Rodriguez performing live visuals. The band continued to perform in Victoria, and XO was re-released by Last Gang Records. The rereleased album garnered national radio airplay for the single "Faded".

In 2014, the band released a cover of Tears for Fears' song "Everybody Wants to Rule the World" in conjunction with Toyota's promotional Scion Sessions, with a video that featured the band dancing in front of the Vancouver Public Library.

In 2015, the band released the single "Hopeful". This was followed in 2016 with a second album, Badu. In advance of the new release, they performed a studio session for the Canadian music magazine Exclaim!, performing an acoustic rendition of "Faded" in the Last Gang Records offices.

In 2018, Ian Bevis and Greg Bevis left the band. Ian began a solo career and Greg moved to Los Angeles to work as a composer for the film industry.

== Discography ==
- XO (21 May 2013, Last Gang Records CD)
- Badu (9 September 2016, Last Gang Records)
