= Homegrown (EP) =

EP by Chris Webby
- Released: November 12, 2013
- Recorded: 2013
- Genre: Hip-hop
- Length: 28:37
- Label: Homegrown; eOne
- Producer: DJ Burn One; Harry Fraud; Sap; Ned Cameron; Remo the Hit Maker; Rich Kidd; DJ Semi; 5PMG

Chris Webby chronology
There Goes the Neighborhood (2011)	Homegrown (2013)	Chemically Imbalanced (2014)

Singles from Homegrown
- 1. "Down Right" Released: August 28, 2013

Homegrown is the second EP by American rapper Chris Webby. The EP was released on November 12, 2013, by his own label Homegrown Music and eOne Music. The EP features a guest appearance by Strange Music rapper Rittz, and contains production by Harry Fraud, DJ Burn One, Rich Kidd, Sap, and Ned Cameron among others. Homegrown was supported by the single "Down Right".

== Background ==
Throughout the Northern Hemisphere Summer months of 2013, Webby non-stop recorded music for his upcoming projects. In mid-2013, Chris Webby signed a record deal with independent powerhouse eOne Music to release his new projects and his Homegrown record label. Following that Webby revealed that he was working on an EP and his debut studio album, which he said will "highlight his transformation from a rapper to an artist." Upon release of the first single in August 2013, the EP was announced to be titled, Homegrown, and released digitally on October 29, 2013. Webby explained the title saying, "It is also my label, Homegrown Music Group. But in general, it is pretty much a word that represents my entire career as a whole. It’s been very organic, it’s been super homegrown. I am still here living in Connecticut. Of course, it also has the herbal references."

On September 4, 2013, Webby released the cover artwork to Homegrown. On October 24, 2013, Webby revealed that the EP's release had been pushed back to November 12, 2013, due to sample clearance issues. Upon revealing the track list, Webby revealed a guest appearance by Strange Music rapper Rittz, and contains production by Harry Fraud, DJ Burn One, Rich Kidd, Sap, and Ned Cameron among others.

== Promotion ==
On April 20, 2013, Chris Webby released the music video for "Turnt Up" featuring Funk Volume's Dizzy Wright. The song was originally meant to be featured on the EP, but could not be due to sample clearance issues. On August 28, 2013, the EP's first single "Down Right" was released to iTunes. Chris Webby also released various left-over tracks leading up the EPs release including, the Cyhi the Prynce featuring "Look At My Name", "Pieces of My Life" and "Blue Skies" (featuring Anna Yvette, produced by Alex 'AK' Kresovich). On October 29, 2013, the EP was made available for pre-order on iTunes.

On November 6, 2013, Webby released "Do Like Me" produced by Ned Cameron as the album's first promotional single. The EP was made available for free streaming on DJBooth.net on November 11, 2013, the day before its release. Following the release of Homegrown, Webby went on the Homegrown Music Winter Tour in promotion of the EP.

== Track listing ==
No.	Title	Producer(s)	Length
1.	"Bar for Bar"	Rich Kidd	3:18
2.	"Rap Nemesis"	DJ Semi	2:50
3.	"Down Right"	Remo the Hit Maker	3:56
4.	"Do Like Me"	Ned Cameron	2:52
5.	"Left Lane"	Harry Fraud	2:59
6.	"Only Way To Go"	Sap	4:03
7.	"Aww Naww"	Remo the Hit Maker	3:45
8.	"Ride On" (featuring Rittz)	DJ Burn One; 5PMG	4:54

== Chart positions ==
Chart (2013)	Peak position
US Billboard 200	75
US Billboard Top R&B/Hip-Hop Albums	16
US Billboard Top Rap Albums	8
US Billboard Top Independent Albums	12
