= Death: An Anthology =

2024 studio album by Enterprise Earth

Studio album by Enterprise Earth
- Released: February 2, 2024
- Recorded: April–August 2023
- Genre: Deathcore; metalcore
- Length: 59:07
- Label: MNRK Music
- Producer: Gabe Mangold

Enterprise Earth chronology
| The Chosen (2022) | Death: An Anthology (2024) | Descent Into Madness (2025) |

Singles from Death: An Anthology
- 1. "King of Ruination" Released: October 11, 2023; 2. "The Reaper's Servant" Released: November 15, 2023; 3. "Casket of Rust" Released: December 13, 2023

Instrumental edition cover
- Artwork used for the Instrumental edition cover

Professional ratings
Review scores
| Source | Rating |
|---|---|
| Boolin Tunes | 8/10 |
| Distorted Sound | 9/10 |
| Ever Metal | 8.5/10 |
| MetalSucks | 3.5/5 |

Death: An Anthology is the fifth studio album by American deathcore band Enterprise Earth, the album was released on February 2, 2024, through MNRK Music. It is the band's first album to feature vocalist Travis Worland and bassist Dakota Johnson and is the band's final album to feature drummer Brandon Zackey as he would depart from the band in August 2024 to join Whitechapel. It is also the band's first album to not feature any original members following the departure of original vocalist Dan Watson in April 2022. An instrumental version of the album was released on May 3, 2024.

== Touring ==
The band would accompany the album with a tour in North America that took place in Mid 2024 with support from Inferi, Crown Magnetar and Tracheotomy. and the Origin of Madness tour that took place in Europe in early 2025 with Distant, The Last Ten Seconds of Life and Harbinger.

== Track listing ==
All tracks are written by Enterprise Earth, except where noted.

Death: An Anthology track listing
| No. | Title | Writer(s) | Length |
|---|---|---|---|
| 1. | "Abyss" | | 1:45 |
| 2. | "Face of Fear" | | 4:08 |
| 3. | "The Reaper's Servant" | | 4:55 |
| 4. | "Spineless" | | 6:41 |
| 5. | "King of Ruination" | Ben Duerr | 5:26 |
| 6. | "Casket of Rust" | | 7:04 |
| 7. | "I, Divine" | | 4:49 |
| 8. | "Malevolent Force" | | 5:43 |
| 9. | "Accelerated Demise" | | 4:40 |
| 10. | "Blood and Teeth" | | 6:45 |
| 11. | "Curse of Flesh" | | 7:06 |
| Total length: | | | 59:07 |

== Personnel ==
Enterprise Earth

- Travis Worland – lead vocals, piano
- Gabe Mangold – guitars, backing vocals, piano, synthesisers, production, mastering, mixing, engineering
- Dakota Johnson – bass, backing vocals
- Brandon Zackey – drums

Guests

- Darius Tehrani (Spite) – vocals on "The Reaper's Servant"
- Ben Duerr (Shadow of Intent) – vocals on "King of Ruination"
- Wes Hauch (Alluvial) – guitar solo on "Malevolent Force"
- Matt Heafy (Trivium) – vocals on "Curse of Flesh"

Other personnel

- Jason Suecof – drum engineering
- Chris Maxwell – cover art
