= Ipek Gorgun =

Turkish experimental musician

- Born: Ankara
- Education: Bilkent University, Galatasaray University and Istanbul Technical University
- Occupations: student and musician
- Known for: Sound artist

Ipek Gorgun (Turkish: İpek Görgün) is a Turkish experimental musician who has been associated with the Red Bull Music Academy. She has opened for the Royal Philharmonic Orchestra and collaborated with Egyptrixx, Ryoji Ikeda and Otomo Yoshihide.

== Life ==
Gorgun was born in Ankara. Her first degree was in political science at Bilkent University and she then studied at Galatasaray University, where her master's degree in philosophy looked at the implications of Martin Heidegger's work. In 2014 she attended the Red Bull Music Academy and this led to her playing with the Japanese sound artist Ryoji Ikeda and the Japanese composer Otomo Yoshihide. She was (in 2018) studying for a doctorate in Sonic Arts at Istanbul Technical University.

She worked for a decade singing and playing the bass for other bands. Her debut album, Aphelion, was released in 2016. In 2017 she was featured on an album with David Psutka, who normally takes the name Egyptrixx. For this collaborative release he called himself Ceramic TL and their eight-track album was Perfect Lung. She went on to play for BBC Radio 3's Open Ear and she played her electronic adaption of Stravinsky's ballet The Firebird as a prelude to the Royal Philharmonic Orchestra's Oggimusica Acousmonium.

In 2018 her second album, Ecce Homo, was released by Touch. Her first album had been self published but Touch had quickly become a publisher and distributor. She was again playing with the Red Bull Academy, playing at Berlin’s Dystopie Sound Art Festival and preparing an exhibition of her photography.

In 2022 her music was performed at the Union Chapel on the opening night of "Organ Reframed". The London Contemporary Orchestra played her music and that of Anna von Hausswolff, Abul Mogard and Gorgun.
