= Donald K. Tarlton =

Canadian record producer (1943–2026)

Donald K. Tarlton CM
- Also known as: Donald K. Donald
- Born: 12 May 1943; Montreal, Quebec, Canada
- Died: 13 April 2026 (aged 82)
- Occupations: Record producer, promoter
- Labels: Last Gang Records, Aquarius

Donald Ross Tarlton CM (12 May 1943 – 13 April 2026) was a Canadian record producer and promoter. He promoted many concerts and Canadian musicians under the name Donald K. Donald.

== Early life and education ==
Tarlton graduated from Rosemere High School in the Laurentian area and then attended Sir George Williams University (now Concordia University). His interest in entertainment promotion began in his youth.

== Career ==
In 1966, Tarlton founded Donald K. Donald Productions, a concert promotion and booking company.

Tarlton was one of several people who founded the Montreal-based Aquarius Records, noted for artists such as April Wine, Corey Hart and Sum 41.

Tarlton was also an occasional theatre promoter in the United States, including the Tony Award-winning Black and Blue and Tango Argentino.

In 1998, Tarlton founded the music industry promotion company Le Groupe DKD and founded several new music labels.

== Death ==
Tarlton died from Parkinson's disease on 13 April 2026, at the age of 82.

== Awards and recognition ==
- 1982: Félix Award, Producer of the Year
- 1989: Tony Awards, Nomination, Best Musical "Black and Blue"
- 2000: Appointed Member of the Order of Canada
- 2002: Queen Elizabeth II Golden Jubilee Medal
- 2007: Walt Grealis Special Achievement Award, presented at the Juno Awards
- 2012: Queen Elizabeth II Diamond Jubilee Medal
- 2015: SOCAN Special Achievement Award
