= Luciferous =

Studio album by Enterprise Earth
- Released: April 5, 2019
- Recorded: 2018
- Genre: Deathcore; technical death metal
- Length: 50:36
- Label: eOne; Good Fight
- Producer: Jason Suecof

Enterprise Earth chronology
Embodiment (2017)	Luciferous (2019)	Enterprise Earth on Audiotree Live (2019)

Enterprise Earth studio album chronology
Embodiment (2017)	Luciferous (2019)	The Chosen (2022)

Singles from Luciferous
- 1. "He Exists" Released: December 13, 2018; 2. "Sleep Is for the Dead" Released: February 25, 2019

Luciferous is the third studio album by American deathcore band Enterprise Earth, the album was released on April 5, 2019 through eOne. It is the band's first album to be released through the label and the first to feature guitarist Gabe Mangold. It is also the band's final album to feature drummer Aaron O'Toole and founding guitarist BJ Sampson. An instrumental version of the album was released on September 27, 2019.

On December 13, 2018, the band announced the album and released the first single titled "He Exists". On February 25, 2019, the band released the second single titled "Sleep Is for the Dead". The music video for the song "The Failsafe Fallacy" was released on April 5, 2019, coinciding with the album release. Two more music videos were released for the songs, "We Are Immortal" and "Scars of the Past", which were released on October 15, 2019 and April 9, 2020 respectively.

The album was named as one of the 50 best metal albums of 2019 by Loudwire.

Professional ratings
Review scores
Source	Rating
Metal Trenches	8/10
New Transcendence	9.5/10

== Track listing ==
Luciferous track listing
No.	Title	Length
1.	"Behold, Malevolence"	4:06
2.	"Sleep Is for the Dead"	3:37
3.	"He Exists"	3:19
4.	"Scars of the Past"	5:40
5.	"Ashamed to Be Human"	2:48
6.	"Requiem"	1:31
7.	"The Failsafe Fallacy"	4:45
8.	"Infernal Suffering"	4:03
9.	"Luciferous"	4:42
10.	"Nightfallen"	2:47
11.	"We Are Immortal"	4:54
12.	"There Is No Tomorrow"	8:24
Total length:		50:36

== Personnel ==
Enterprise Earth

- Dan Watson – vocals
- Gabe Mangold – guitar, bass
- BJ Sampson – guitar
- Rob Saireh – bass (credit only; does not perform on the album)
- Aaron O'Toole – drums

Other personnel

- Jason Suecof – producer
