= Patient 0 (album) =

2015 studio album by Enterprise Earth

Studio album by Enterprise Earth
- Released: December 11, 2015
- Genre: Deathcore
- Length: 37:29
- Label: Stay Sick
- Producer: BJ Sampson

Enterprise Earth chronology
XXIII (2014)	Patient 0 (2015)	Embodiment (2017)

Singles from Patient 0
- 1. "Transorbital Awakening" Released: April 24, 2015; 2. "Amorphous" Released: June 10, 2015; 3. "Theophany" Released: August 21, 2015; 4. "Shallow Breath" Released: October 12, 2015; 5. "Hollow Face" Released: November 10, 2015

Patient 0 (stylised Patient ∅) is the debut studio album by American deathcore band Enterprise Earth, released on December 11, 2015 through Stay Sick Recordings. It is the band's first album to be released through the label.

In April 2015, the band announced that they have left their label We Are Triumphant and released the single "Transorbital Awakening" featuring a guest guitar solo from Rings of Saturn's Joel Omans (who would join Enterprise Earth in 2016). In June 2015, the band signed to Stay Sick Recordings (the label of Attila's frontman Chris Fronzak) and released another single titled "Amorphous" featuring Oceano's Adam Warren. Three more singles followed after that, "Theophany", released on August 21. Shallow Breath along with its music video was released on October 12, and Hollow Face on November 10. On May 25, 2016 the band released a music video for the song "Amid Vultures".

Professional ratings
Review scores
Source	Rating
New Transcendence	10/10
Spirit of Metal	17/20

== Track listing ==
Patient 0 track listing
No.	Title	Length
1.	"Shallow Breath"	3:17
2.	"Theophany"	5:00
3.	"Hollow Face"	3:13
4.	"Amid Vultures"	3:04
5.	"Porcelain Whore"	3:20
6.	"Kiss of the Recluse"	3:43
7.	"Sus Cibum" ("Pig Meat")	2:52
8.	"Transorbital Awakening"	4:17
9.	"Patient Zero"	5:12
10.	"Amorphous"	3:31
Total length:		37:29

== Personnel ==
Enterprise Earth

- Dan Watson – vocals
- BJ Sampson – guitar, bass, drum programming, clean vocals on "Patient Zero", engineering, production, mixing
- Will Garcia – guitar
- Cliff Wagle – guitar
- Brian Moore – bass (credit only; does not perform on the album)
- Michael Davidson – drums (credit only; does not perform on the album)

Guests

- Dickie Allen (Infant Annihilator, Nekrogoblikon, Scumfuck) – vocals on "Porcelain Whore"
- Orion Stephens (In Dying Arms) – vocals on "Kiss of the Recluse"
- Joel Omans (ex-Rings of Saturn) – guitar solo on "Transorbital Awakening"
- Adam Warren (ex-Oceano) – vocals on "Amorphous"

Other personnel

- Stephen Hawkes – mastering
