= Loving (band) =

Canadian psychedelic folk band

- Origin: Victoria, British Columbia
- Genres: indie pop
- Years active: 2016-present

Loving is a Canadian psychedelic folk band from Victoria, British Columbia. The group got its start with the release of their self-titled EP in 2016. The groups' members include David Parry, and brothers Lucas and Jesse Henderson.

Parry is a multi-instrumentalist and producer, while brothers Lucas and Jesse share lyric writing credits and contribute vocals to their records. All three members have written songs for the group.

== History ==
Loving released their self-titled EP in June 2016. After an unexpectedly positive response, Loving pressed a 12-inch vinyl of their EP, with two additional tracks, roughly three years after their EP's initial release.

Loving released their debut LP If I Am Only My Thoughts on January 1, 2020, via Last Gang Records.

Loving subsequently released their second LP Any Light on February 9, 2024.

== Band Members ==
- Jesse Henderson
- David Perry
- Lucas Henderson (former)

== Discography ==
Studio Albums

- If I Am Only My Thoughts (2020)
- Any Light (2024)

Extended Plays

- Loving (2016)
