= Bang Lime =

- Genre: Indie rock
- Spinoff of: Metric

Bang Lime is an indie rock group created by Joules Scott-Key and Josh Winstead of the new wave/indie group Metric. The duo's history, which spans several bands, encompasses several acquired musical styles that are reflected in Bang Lime's music.

== Musicians' history ==
Drummer Joules Scott-Key and Guitarist/Vocalist Joshua Winstead met in 1991 while attending school in Denton, Texas.

As a newly formed duo, Winstead and Scott-Key played several venues on the Texas Noise rock scene, as well as the underground goth/rock genre in New York City. Later, as the rhythm section for the Canadian new wave/indie quartet Metric, the duo received mass exposure via world tours. This was Scott-Key and Winstead's introduction to a wider spectrum of musical styles that would be heard later in their first Bang Lime album.

While still involved with Metric, Winstead and Scott-Key decided to create their own group to continue creating music while not working with their primary ensemble. This ensemble became Bang Lime. The name was inspired by a poem about sex written by Winstead, and chosen by Scott-Key.

At present, Bang Lime is based in Oakland, California, where they have further experimented musically with facets of the punk genre. Their musical incarnation to date is described by the duo as an experiment with punk, noise, rock and 1960s blues.

== Musical attributes ==
The complexity of Bang Lime's sound stems from Winstead's and Scott-Key's exposure to several different genres of music over their years of experience that have been compressed into one conglomerate sound. Although both Winstead and Scott-Key enjoyed playing the repertoire of Metric, when asked about it, Winstead admitted that he had songs that were "not in the Metric style and they [had] to come out or [he would] go crazy."

Bang Lime's musical style is a departure from that of Metric; according to Winstead, Bang Lime is "a little more male driven rock" with a "heavier" sound.

== Discography ==
Bang Lime released their first album Best Friends In Love on August 14, 2007, on Last Gang Records in New York City. This is the group's only released album.

As reviewed by The Tripwire, Best Friends in Love combines "the best parts of Death From Above 1979, [mashed together] with a little Electric Six, and [served] with a side order of White Stripes."

This conglomeration of sounds is present from the opening track "Kings and Queens", which is described by The Tripwire as "no-frills, grimy indie rock" but "in a damn good way". With the subsequent song "The Death of Death", a new sound is expressed, one that sounds almost "like a stripped down version of Queens Of The Stone Age" in terms of Bang Lime's incorporation of "fat guitar licks and infectious melodies".
