= 23 (Enterprise Earth EP) =

2014 EP by Enterprise Earth

EP by Enterprise Earth
- Released: October 14, 2014
- Genre: Deathcore
- Length: 16:08
- Label: We Are Triumphant

Enterprise Earth chronology
23 (2014)	Patient 0 (2015)

Singles from 23
- 1. "Masquerade of Angels" Released: June 6, 2014; 2. "Shepherd of Synthesis" Released: September 23, 2014

Professional ratings
Review scores
Source	Rating
New Transcendence	8.75/10

23 (stylised XXIII) is the debut EP by American deathcore band Enterprise Earth, released on October 14, 2014 through We Are Triumphant. It is the band's only release to be released through the label, as they would sign to Chris Fronzak's (frontman of Attila) label Stay Sick Recordings in 2015.

The band quickly released their first single titled "Masquerade of Angels" on June 6, 2014, followed by their second single "Shepherd of Synthesis" which was released on September 23, 2014. The music video for Masquerade of Angels was released on October 6, 2014.

== Track listing ==
23 track listing
No.	Title	Length
1.	"23"	2:47
2.	"The Truman Show"	2:54
3.	"Shepherd of Synthesis"	3:39
4.	"Masquerade of Angels"	3:37
5.	"Illusory Reality"	3:11
Total length:		16:08

== Personnel ==
Enterprise Earth

- Dan Watson – vocals
- BJ Sampson – guitar, bass, drum programming
- Kevin Rogers – guitar
- Conner Schneberger – bass (credit only; does not perform on the album)
- Ryan Folden – drums (credit only; does not perform on the album)
