= MNRK Music Group =

American independent record label company

- Formerly: Koch Records; E1 Music; eOne Music
- Type: Subsidiary
- Industry: Music; Music publishing; Music production; Music recording; Artist management; Live entertainment
- Founded: January 1987; 39 years ago (as Koch Records)
- Founder: Michael Koch
- Headquarters: 40 Wall Street, 6th floor, New York City, United States
- Key people: Sean Stevenson (President and CEO)
- Products: Music albums; records; music videos
- Parent: Koch Entertainment (1987–2005); Entertainment One (2005–2021); Blackstone Inc. (2021–)
- Subsidiaries: DRG Records; In the Paint Records; Light Records; Last Gang Records; Dualtone Records; La Commission; Prosthetic Records
- Website: www.mnrk.com

MNRK Music Group (pronounced "monarch"), formerly known as Koch Records, then E1 Music, and later stylized as eOne Music, is an American independent record label and music management company based in New York City. It was formed in 1987 as a music division of Koch Entertainment, which was acquired by and absorbed into Entertainment One (or eOne for short) in 2004. eOne was acquired by toy and multimedia company Hasbro in 2019, absorbed its family brands division in the process and announced the sale of this division to the Blackstone Group in April 2021, which then adopted this name. Hasbro then sold the remains of eOne to Lionsgate, who then rebranded it initially as eOne Canada and then Lionsgate Canada.

MNRK owns the libraries of Artemis Records, Dualtone Records, Last Gang Records and Prosthetic Records.

== History ==
=== Background ===
The label as a whole has its origins in the Canadian music distributor Records on Wheels, which was acquired by the Canadian retail chain CD Plus in 2001 to expand its wholesale business. Darren Throop joined the company after CD Plus acquired his record store chain Urban Sound Exchange. The combined company later became known as ROW Entertainment, with Throop as president and CEO.

In June 2005, ROW acquired the American independent music distributor and home entertainment publisher Koch Entertainment, including its label Koch Records.

From 1999 to 2005, Koch operated a Nashville, Tennessee, division dedicated to country music, originally known as Audium Records. The Nashville division's roster included Restless Heart, David Lee Murphy, Daryle Singletary, Cledus T. Judd, and the Tractors. This division was closed in October 2005.

In 2008, Koch launched HipHopCanada Records, in partnership with the publication HipHopCanada.

=== As eOne Music ===
Koch was renamed E1 Music in 2009. E1 acquired IndieBlu Music, parent of Artemis Records and V2 Records North America, in 2010.

In 2013, eOne acquired the library of defunct hip-hop label Death Row Records. In January 2016, eOne acquired Dualtone Records. In March 2016, eOne acquired Canadian label Last Gang Records, and hired its founder, music industry lawyer Chris Taylor, as global president of eOne Music.

In 2016, eOne acquired the management firms Hardlivings and Nerve Artist Management. In November 2016, eOne Music hired Ted May, the former senior international marketing manager of Universal Music UK, as director for its UK division, operating from eOne's offices in London. In March 2018, eOne Music acquired the live event production company Round Room Entertainment.

In 2019, Amelia Artists partnered with eOne's management division. Later in 2019, eOne partnered with the Latin management and marketing group Entotal. In November 2020, it signed AMPED Distribution as its new physical distributor in North America.

=== Sale and rebrand as MNRK ===
In April 2021, following the acquisition of its parent company by toy and entertainment company Hasbro, eOne announced that it would divest its music business to the private equity firm The Blackstone Group for $385 million, in order to focus more on its film and television entertainment businesses.

The sale was completed in June, and the unit continued to use the eOne branding until September 2021; when the company was subsequently renamed MNRK Music Group.

On February 9, 2022, MNRK sold the rights to the Death Row Records brand and catalogue to hip-hop rapper Snoop Dogg.

- List of MNRK Music Group artists (list includes artists signed to or distributed by Koch)
- MNRK Music Group discography
- Entertainment One
