= Serj Tankian discography =

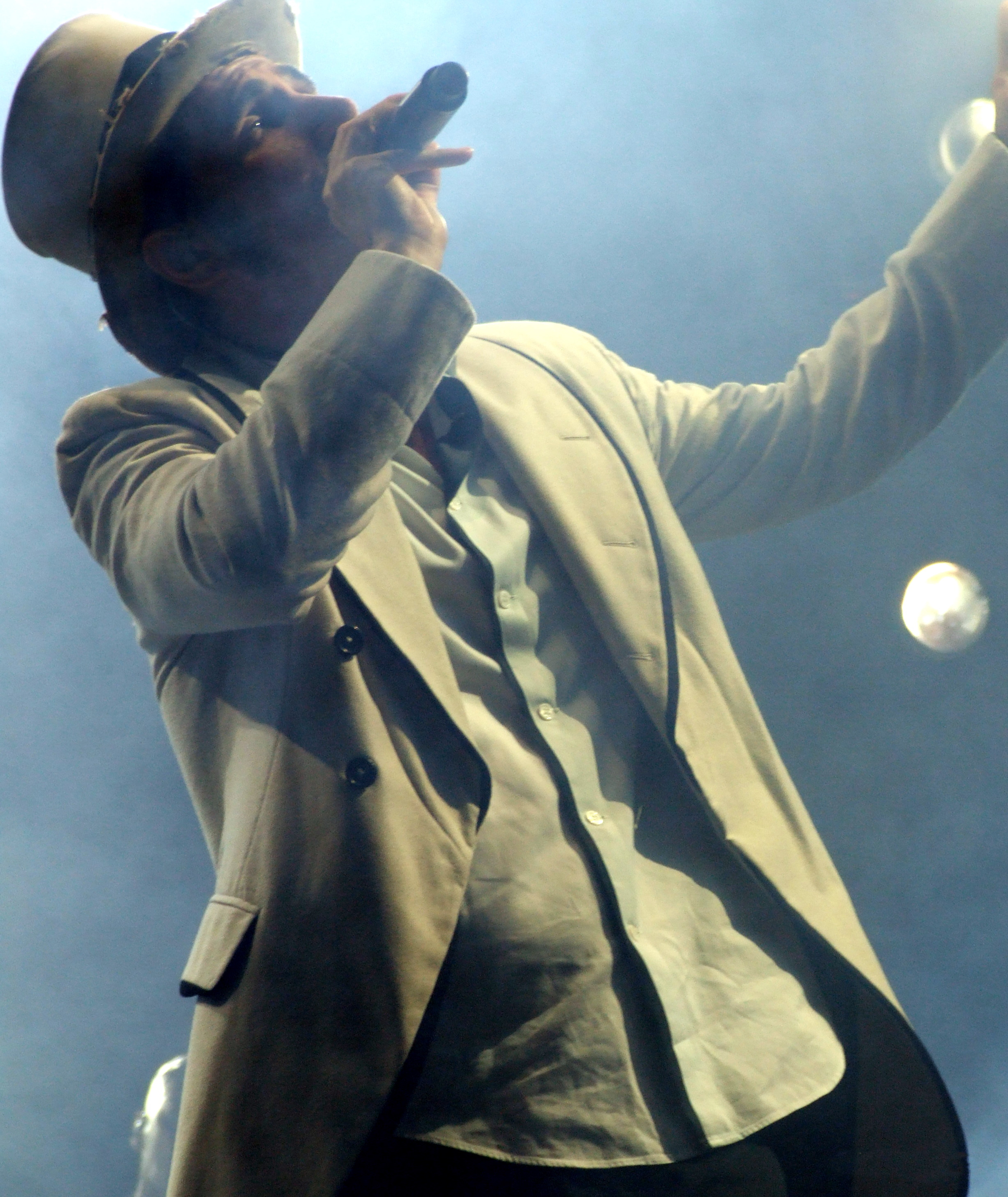
- Studio albums: 5
- Extended plays: 5
- Live albums: 4
- Singles: 36
- Video albums: 1
- Music videos: 23
- Collaborative albums: 2

The following is the discography of Serj Tankian, an Armenian-American singer and musician. He is best known as the lead vocalist, songwriter, keyboardist, and occasionally rhythm guitarist of the Grammy Award-winning metal band System of a Down.

This discography consists of five studio albums, two collaboration album, four EPs, four live album/DVD, thirty-three singles, twenty-three music videos, and all other known appearances by Tankian on other artists' albums, soundtracks, and in video games. This article also contains the production credits by Tankian. The list does not include anything performed or recorded with System of a Down. To see recordings by System of a Down, see System of a Down discography.

== Albums ==
=== Studio albums ===
List of studio albums, with selected details and chart positions
Title	Album details	Peak chart positions									
Title	Album details	US	AUS	AUT	FRA	GER	ITA	NLD	NZ	SWI	UK
Elect the Dead	Released: October 23, 2007; Label: Serjical Strike, Reprise; Formats: CD, LP, digital download	4	19	5	23	10	31	45	14	11	26
Imperfect Harmonies	Released: September 21, 2010; Label: Serjical Strike, Reprise; Formats: CD, LP, digital download	35	56	13	29	18	23	94	26	12	86
Harakiri	Released: July 10, 2012; Label: Serjical Strike, Reprise; Formats: CD, digital download	29	86	10	37	12	36	—	27	13	87
Orca	Released: June 25, 2013; Label: Serjical Strike, Reprise; Formats: CD, LP, digital download	—	—	—	—	—	—	—	—	—	—
Covers, Collaborations & Collages	Released: October 24, 2025; Label: Serjical Strike, Reprise; Formats: digital download	—	—	—	—	—	—	—	—	—	—
"—" denotes releases that did not chart or were not released in that territory.

=== Live albums ===
Year	Album details	Peak chart positions					
Year	Album details	AUT	FRA	GER	GRC	NZ	SWI
2010	Elect the Dead Symphony: Released: March 9, 2010; Label: Serjical Strike, Reprise; Formats: CD, LP, digital download	38	118	63	5	12	64
2021	Live in Edmonton (with The F.C.C.): Released: November 29, 2021; Label: Serjical Strike; Formats: digital download	—	—	—	—	—	—
2022	Live at Leeds (with The F.C.C.): Released: April 8, 2022; Label: Serjical Strike; Formats: digital download	—	—	—	—	—	—
2023	Invocations: Released: November 10, 2023; Label: Serjical Strike; Formats: digital download	—	—	—	—	—	—

=== Collaborative albums ===
Year	Album details
2003	Serart (with Arto Tunçboyacıyan): Released: May 6, 2003; Label: Serjical Strike, Columbia; Formats: CD/DVD, LP, digital download
2020	Fuktronic (with Jimmy Urine): Released: May 8, 2020; Label: Formats: LP, digital download

=== Soundtracks ===
- Prometheus Bound (2011)
- The Last Inhabitant (2016)
- 1915 (2016)
- Intent to Destroy (2017)
- Furious (2017)
- Spitak (2018)
- Midnight Star (2019)
- Truth to Power (2021)
- I Am Not Alone (2021)
- Madoff: The Monster of Wall Street (2023)

== EPs ==
Year	EP details
2008	Lie Lie Live: Released: July 1, 2008; Label: Serjical Strike, Reprise; Formats: Digital download
2011	Imperfect Remixes: Released: March 1, 2011; Label: Serjical Strike, Reprise; Formats: Digital download
2021	Elasticity: Released: March 19, 2021; Label: United Trust of Sonic Preservation, Alchemy, BMG; Formats: CD digital download, streaming vinyl
2022	Perplex Cities: Released: October 21, 2022; Label: United Trust of Sonic Preservation, Alchemy, BMG; Formats: Digital download
2024	Foundations: Released: September 27, 2024

== Singles ==
=== As lead artist ===
Year	Song	Peak chart positions							Album
Year	Song	US	US Alt.	US Main.	US Rock	CAN	POL	UK	Album
2007	"The Unthinking Majority"	—	—	—	—	—	—	—	Elect the Dead
2007	"Empty Walls"	97	3	4	—	75	—	78	Elect the Dead
2007	"Lie Lie Lie"	—	—	—	—	—	—	—	Elect the Dead
2008	"Sky Is Over"	—	22	23	—	—	46	—	Elect the Dead
2008	"Fears"	—	—	—	—	—	—	—	Non-album single
2010	"The Charade"	—	—	—	—	—	—	—	Elect the Dead Symphony
2010	"Bird's Eye" (with Marc Streitenfeld & Mike Patton)	—	—	—	—	—	—	—	Body of Lies
2010	"Left of Center"	—	—	—	—	—	—	—	Imperfect Harmonies
2010	"Reconstructive Demonstrations"	—	—	—	—	—	29	—	Imperfect Harmonies
2011	"The Hunger" (with Shirley Manson)	—	—	—	—	—	—	—	Prometheus Bound
2012	"Figure It Out"	—	—	17	44	—	—	—	Harakiri
2012	"Cornucopia"	—	—	—	—	—	36	—	Harakiri
2012	"Harakiri"	—	—	40	—	—	78	—	Harakiri
2012	"We Are the 99 Percent" (with Tom Morello & Tim McIlrath)	—	—	—	—	—	—	—	Non-album singles
2014	"Hali" (with Pedro Meirelles & Eugene Hütz)	—	—	—	—	—	—	—	Non-album singles
2016	"Artsakh"	—	—	—	—	—	—	—	Non-album singles
2016	"Aurora's Dream" (featuring Veronika Stalder)	—	—	—	—	—	—	—	Non-album singles
2017	"Industrialized Overload"	—	—	—	—	—	—	—	Non-album singles
2018	"The Rough Dog" (with Ara Malikian)	—	—	—	—	—	—	—	Royal Garage
2019	"Black Blooms" (with O.R.k.)	—	—	—	—	—	—	—	Ramagehead
2020	"Introvert (Call Me Crazy)" (with Sebu, mISHØ)	—	—	—	—	—	—	—	Non-album singles
2020	"Hayastane"	—	—	—	—	—	—	—	Non-album singles
2021	"Disarming Time: A Modern Piano Concerto"	—	—	—	—	—	—	—	Cool Gardens Poetry Suite
2022	"Amber" (with Sevak Amroyan)	—	—	—	—	—	—	—	Non-album single
2024	"A.F. Day"	—	—	—	—	—	—	—	Foundations
2024	"Justice Will Shine On"	—	—	—	—	—	—	—	Foundations

=== Promotional singles ===
Year	Song	Album
2008	"Honking Antelope"	Elect the Dead
2010	"Borders Are..."	Imperfect Harmonies
2010	"Yes, It's Genocide"	Imperfect Harmonies
2011	"Deserving?"	Imperfect Harmonies
2011	"Goodbye – Gate 21" (featuring Tom Morello)	Imperfect Remixes

==== As featured artist ====
Year	Song	Peak chart positions	Album
Year	Song	US Main.	Album
2007	"Mein" (Deftones featuring Serj Tankian)	40	Saturday Night Wrist
2013	"We Are" (Ray Harmony featuring Serj Tankian, Ihsahn, Devin Townsend & Abbie Johnson)	—	Non-album single
2014	"Shooting Helicopters" (Benny Benassi featuring Serj Tankian)	—	Danceaholic
2019	"A Higher Frequency" (Tom Morello featuring Serj Tankian & Attlas)	—	10 Years of Mom+Pop
2021	"Moonhearts in Space" (Tina Guo featuring Serj Tankian)	—	Dies Irae
2023	"Black Thunder" (The Hu featuring Serj Tankian & Daniel "DL" Laskiewicz)	11	Rumble of Thunder
2024	"I'm Afraid of Stars" (Nemra featuring Serj Tankian)	—	The End of the Party
2026	"Joseph" (Falling in Reverse featuring Corey Taylor and Serj Tankian)	—	Non-album single

== Music videos ==
Year	Song	Director(s)
2005	"We Are One" (with Buckethead)	Rodney Ascher and Syd Garon
2007	"The Unthinking Majority"	Tawd B. Dorenfeld
2007	"Empty Walls"	Tony Petrossian
2007	"Saving Us"	Kevin Estrada
2007	"Feed Us"	Sevag Vrej
2007	"Lie Lie Lie"	Martha Colburn
2007	"Honking Antelope"	Roger Kupelian
2007	"Elect the Dead"	Gariné Torossian
2007	"Baby"	Isaac "Eye-Sack" Flores
2007	"Sky Is Over"	José Rivera
2007	"Beethoven's Cunt"	Adam Egypt Mortimer
2007	"Money"	Ara Soudjian
2007	"Praise the Lord and Pass the Ammunition"	Greg Watermann
2008	"Sky Is Over" (Alt Video)	Jose Rivera
2010	"Left of Center"	Tawd B. Dorenfeld
2011	"Reconstructive Demonstrations"	Roger Kupelian
2011	"Goodbye – Gate 21" (Rock Remix; feat. The FCC & Tom Morello)	Ara Soudjian and George Tonikian
2012	"Figure It Out"	Ara Soudjian
2012	"Harakiri"	Nico Sabenorio
2012	"Occupied Tears"	Eric Nazarian
2012	"Uneducated Democracy"	Narek Minasyan and Nareh Hovhannissyan
2013	"Orca Act I – Victorious Orcinus" (Truncated Studio Version)	Aaron Faulls
2013	"Orca Act II – Oceanic Subterfuge"	Aaron Faulls
2016	"Ari Im Sokhag" (feat. Larisa Hovannisian)	Garin Hovannisian
2016	"Artsakh"	Rand Courtney
2017	"A Fine Morning To Die" (with Iowa)	—N/a
2020	"Hayastane - Հայաստանը"	Armen Soudjian
2021	"Elasticity"	Vlad Kaptur
2021	"Electric Yerevan"	Garin Hovannisian
2021	"Your Mom"	D.S. Bradford
2021	"Rumi"	Craig Ray
2021	"How Many Times?"	Roger Kupelian
2021	"Disarming Time: A Modern Piano Concerto"	Serj Tankian
2022	"Amber" (with Sevak Amroyan)	Hrag Yedalian
2024	"A.F. Day"	Ara Soudjian
2024	"Justice Will Shine On"	Ara Soudjian and Todd Harapiak
2024	"Cartoon Buyer"	Ara Soudjian and Todd Harapiak
2024	"Appropriations"	Ara Soudjian and Todd Harapiak
2024	"Life's Revengeful Son"	Ara Soudjian and Todd Harapiak

== Other appearances ==
Year	Artist	Song	Release and/or explanation
Albums, soundtracks, and video games
1999	Limp Bizkit feat. Serj Tankian	"Don't Go Off Wandering" (Demo)	Demo for Significant Other
2000	Hed PE feat. Serj Tankian and Morgan Lander	"Feel Good"	Broke
2000	Tony Iommi feat. Serj Tankian	"Patterns"	Iommi
2000	Snot feat. Serj Tankian	"Starlit Eyes"	Strait Up
2001	Dog Fashion Disco feat. Serj Tankian	"Mushroom Cult"	Anarchists of Good Taste
2003	Serj Tankian	"Bird of Paradise"	Bird Up: The Charlie Parker Remix Project
2003	Kittens for Christian feat. Serj Tankian	"Had a Plan"	Privilege of Your Company
2004	Saul Williams feat. Serj Tankian	"Talk to Strangers"	Saul Williams
2004	Flea, Brad Wilk, Tom Morello, Pete Yorn, Tim Walker, Serj Tankian, Maynard James Keenan, and Jonny Polonsky	"Where the Streets Have No Name"	Axis of Justice: Concert Series Volume 1
2004	Flea, Brad Wilk, Tom Morello, Pete Yorn, and Serj Tankian	"Alice in My Fantasies"	Axis of Justice: Concert Series Volume 1
2004	Serj Tankian	"Piano Improvization"	Axis of Justice: Concert Series Volume 1
2004	Serj Tankian	"Charades"	Axis of Justice: Concert Series Volume 1
2004	Serj Tankian, Tom Morello, Wayne Kramer, Flea, and John Dolmayan	"Get Up, Stand Up"	Axis of Justice: Concert Series Volume 1
2004	Flea, Brad Wilk, and Serj Tankian	"(Free Jam)"	Axis of Justice: Concert Series Volume 1
2004	Knowledge and Serj Tankian	"Speak on It"	Axis of Justice: Concert Series Volume 1
2004	Tom Morello, Serj Tankian, Pete Yorn, Flea, and Brad Wilk	"Chimes of Freedom"	Axis of Justice: Concert Series Volume 1
2004	Serj Tankian, Tom Morello, Brad Wilk, and Brian O'Conner	"Jeffrey Are You Listening?"	Axis of Justice: Concert Series Volume 1
2004	The Nightwatchman, Serj Tankian, Pete Yorn, Brad Wilk, and Jonny Polonsky	"The Road I Must Travel"	Axis of Justice: Concert Series Volume 1
2004	Serj Tankian	"Improvizational Noise"	Axis of Justice: Concert Series Volume 1
2005	Buckethead feat. Serj Tankian	"We Are One"	Enter the Chicken, Masters of Horror soundtrack
2005	Buckethead feat. Azam Ali and Serj Tankian	"Coma"	Enter the Chicken
2005	Buckethead feat. Shana Halligan and Serj Tankian	"Waiting Hare"	Enter the Chicken
2006	Deftones feat. Serj Tankian	"Mein"	Saturday Night Wrist
2007	Les Rita Mitsouko feat. Serj Tankian	"Terminal Beauty"	Variéty
2007	Serj Tankian	"Bug Theme"	Bug soundtrack
2007	Serj Tankian and Petra Jolly	"Innermission"	Bug soundtrack
2007	Serj Tankian	"The Essence of Tequila"	Stranglehold
2007	Serj Tankian	"Chicakong"	Stranglehold
2007	Wyclef Jean feat. Serj Tankian and Sizzla	"Riot (Trouble Again)"	Carnival Vol. II: Memoirs of an Immigrant
2008	Praxis feat. Serj Tankian	"Sulfur and Cheese"	Profanation (Preparation for a Coming Darkness)
2008	Serj Tankian	"Beethoven's Cunt"	Downloadable track for Rock Band
2008	Bitter:Sweet feat. Serj Tankian	"Drama" (Serj Tankian version)	Drama
2008	The Nightwatchman feat. Serj Tankian	"Lazarus on Down"	The Fabled City
2008	Mike Patton, Serj Tankian, and Marc Streitenfeld	"Bird's Eye"	Body of Lies
2008	Serj Tankian	"Fears"	Written exclusively in support of Amnesty International's Global Write-A-Thon
2009	Khatchadour Tankian feat. Serj Tankian	"Bari Arakeel"	Inchbes Moranank
2009	Khatchadour Tankian feat. Serj Tankian	"Martigi Yerke"	Inchbes Moranank
2010	Viza feat. Serj Tankian	"Viktor"	Made in Chernobyl
2010	Serj Tankian	"Empty Walls"	Downloadable tracks for Rock Band
2010	Serj Tankian	"Sky Is Over"	Downloadable tracks for Rock Band
2011	Serj Tankian	"Total Paranoia"	Batman: Arkham City – The Album
2011	Serj Tankian	"Yellow Snow"	The Frank Zappa AAAFNRAAAAAM Birthday Bundle 2011
2011	Jonathan Elias feat. Jim Morrison, Joanne Shenandoah, Leah Shenandoah, Robert Downey Jr., Serj Tankian, Sinéad O'Connor	"Path to Zero"	Prayer Cycle: Path to Zero
2012	Tom Morello, Serj Tankian, Tim McIlrath	"We Are The 99 Percent"	Occupy Anthem
2013	Serj Tankian	Soundtrack of "Morning Star" (Upcoming video game)	Industrial Toys
2013	Device feat. Serj Tankian and Geezer Butler	"Out of Line"	Device
2013	Serj Tankian, Ihsahn, Devin Townsend	"We Are"	Revolution Harmony
2013	Tech N9ne featuring Krizz Kaliko & Serj Tankian	"Straight Out The Gate"	Something Else
2014	Benny Benassi featuring Serj Tankian	"Shooting Helicopters"	Shooting Helicopters – Single
2014	Pedro Meirelles featuring Serj Tankian & Eugene Hütz	"Hali"	Hali – Single
2014	Alla Levonyan, Isabel Bayrakdarian, Serj Tankian, Gor Sujian, Tigran Petrosyan, Arto Tuncboyaciyan and Little Singers of Armenia	"Imagine"	IMAGINE Armenia song
2015	Serj Tankian, Tom Morello, Rudy Sarzo, Vinny Appice	"Crazy Train"	Immortal Randy Rhoads – The Ultimate Tribute
2022	Two Feathers, Serj Tankian.	No Tomorrow	Metal: Hellsinger
2019	Ramin Djawadi, Serj Tankian.	The Rains of Castamere	Game of Thrones: Season 8
2019	Bear McCreary, Serj Tankian	"Godzilla"	Godzilla: King of the Monsters
Live performances
1999	Fear Factory feat. Serj Tankian	"Cars"	
2000	Incubus feat. Serj Tankian	Live Improvisation on "Redefine"	
2000	Metallica feat. Serj Tankian and Daron Malakian	"Mastertarium" ("Welcome Home (Sanitarium)" part)	
2003	Metallica feat. Serj Tankian and Daron Malakian	"Creeping Death"	Reading Festival 2003
2006	Buckethead feat. Shana Halligan and Serj Tankian	"Waiting Hare"	
2007	Tool feat. Serj Tankian	"Sober" (improvisational version)	Big Day Out 2007 (Auckland only)
2007	Fair to Midland feat. Serj Tankian	"Walls of Jericho" (improvisational version)	Coachella 2007
2007	Foo Fighters feat. Serj Tankian	"Holiday in Cambodia"	2007 MTV Video Music Awards (released on Foo Fighters' single for "Long Road to Ruin")
2008	The Nightwatchman feat. Serj Tankian	"Lazarus on Down"	Big Day Out 2008 (Auckland only)
2009	Visa feat. Serj Tankian	"Viktor"	Feed the Need Event
2011	Tom Morello and Serj Tankian	"Ghost of Tom Joad"	Dimebash 2011
2011	Serj Tankian, Stewart Copeland, Omar Fadel	"Qakastan – Hymn of the Republic" and "Sunday Nuts"	Sacred Grove
2012	Deftones feat. Serj Tankian	"Root"	Knotfest 2012
2017	Prophets of Rage feat. Serj Tankian	"Like a Stone"	Rock am Ring 2017
2024	The Cost feat. Serj Tankian	"Her Eyes"	
Remixes
2005	MIA	"Galang" (Serj Tankian Remix)	Galang '05
2006	Dredg	"Ode to the Sun" (Serj Tankian Remix)	Unreleased
2006	The Notorious B.I.G.	"Who Shot Ya?" (Serj Tankian Remix)	Marc Eckō's Getting Up: Contents Under Pressure

== Production discography ==
Tankian has also produced a number of albums.

Year	Album	Artist	Credit(s)
1998	System of a Down	System of a Down	Producer, credited as System of a Down
2001	Toxicity	System of a Down	Co-Producer
2003	Serart Sampler	Serart	Producer, executive producer, and A&R
2003	Serart	Serart	Producer, executive producer, and A&R
2004	Axis of Justice: Concert Series Volume 1	Various artists	Producer and executive producer
2005	Enter the Chicken	Buckethead & Friends	Producer
2006	Slow Motion Reign	Slow Motion Reign	Producer
2006	The Drawn and Quartered EP	Fair to Midland	Producer
2007	Fables from a Mayfly: What I Tell You Three Times Is True	Fair to Midland	Executive producer
2007	Elect the Dead	Serj Tankian	Producer
2010	Elect the Dead Symphony	Serj Tankian	Producer
2010	Imperfect Harmonies	Serj Tankian	Producer
2012	Harakiri	Serj Tankian	Producer
2013	Orca	Serj Tankian	Producer
2013	Jazz-Iz-Christ	Serj Tankian	Producer
