= Bad Acid Trip =

American metal band

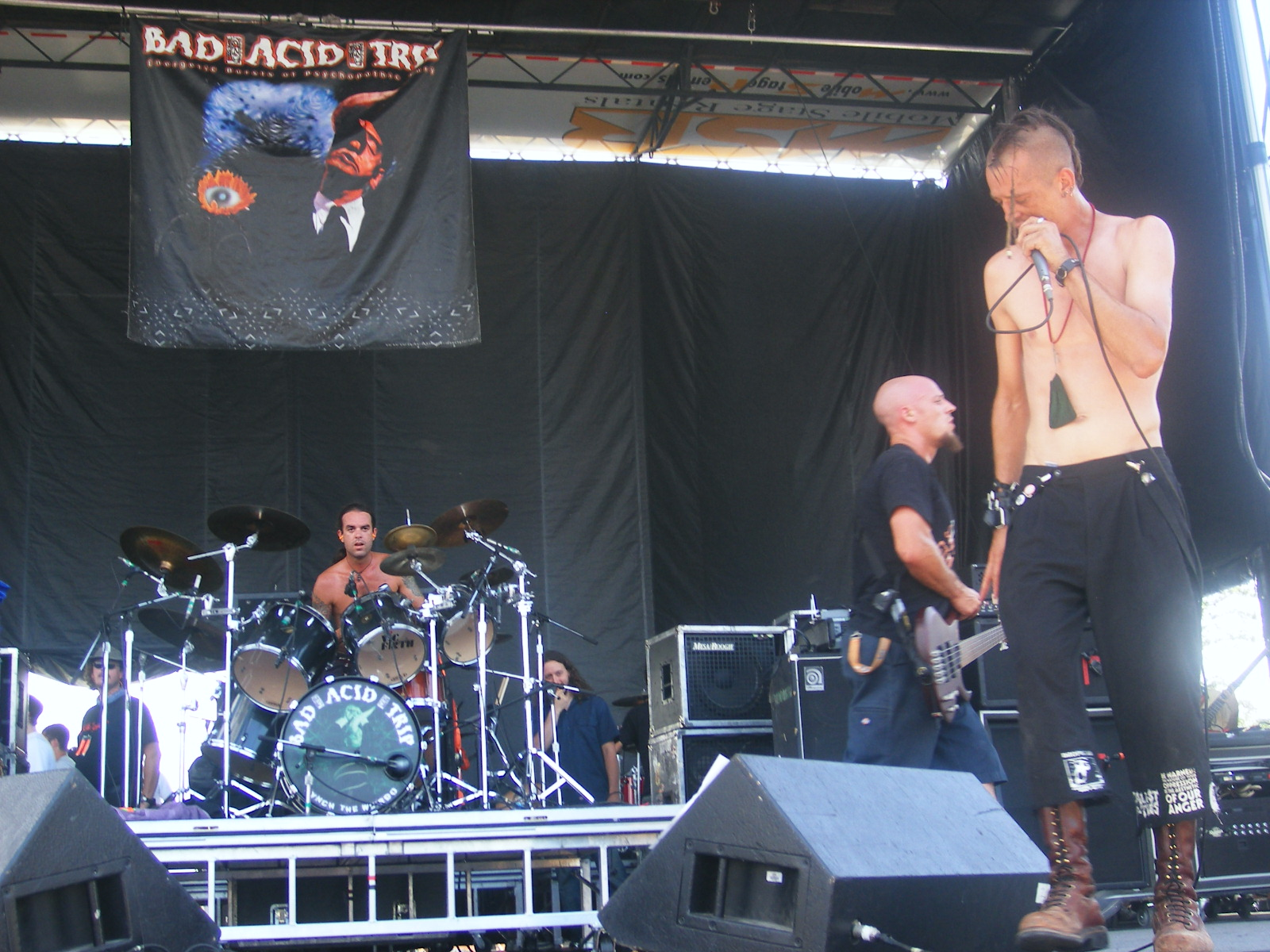
- Bad Acid Trip at Ozzfest 2006 In West Palm Beach, FL

Background information
- Origin: United States
- Genres: Avant-garde metal; grindcore; crossover thrash; powerviolence
- Years active: 1989–present
- Label: Serjical Strike
- Members: Dirk Rogers; Caleb Schneider; Carlos Neri
- Past members: James Garren; Phil Hernandez; Chris Mackie; Jose Perez; Damian Talmadge; Mike Thrashead; Joe Whitehouse; Keith Aazami
- Website: badacidtripgrind.com

Bad Acid Trip is an American metal band currently signed to System of a Down lead singer Serj Tankian's record label Serjical Strike Records. Their 2004 album, Lynch the Weirdo, was produced by Daron Malakian, another System of a Down member. In 2006, they performed on the second stage at the Ozzfest summer tour. The band has three full-length releases (For the Weird by the Weird, Lynch the Weirdo, and Humanly Possible) and multiple EPs.

== Biography ==
Bad Acid Trip was formed in North Hollywood, California, in 1989 during the beginnings of the West Coast power violence scene. The current members of Bad Acid Trip are Dirk Rogers, Carlos Neri and Caleb Schneider. Original members Dirk Rogers and Keith Aazami have collaborated for more than 10 years. Bad Acid Trip has toured in support of various bands including System of a Down, the Mars Volta, Mindless Self Indulgence, the Dillinger Escape Plan, Dog Fashion Disco, Tub Ring, Motograter, Watch Them Die, and Gwar. Other bands they have shared the stage with include Slayer, Arch Enemy, Cypress Hill, Hatebreed, Brujeria, Body Count, Buckethead, Tom Morello, Circle One, and Napalm Death.

MTV 2's Headbangers Ball television show broadcast the music video "Beef Moo", a song featured on the album Lynch the Weirdo.

The EP Symbiotic Slavery was released on August 18, 2009, in order to fill the large gap between Lynch the Weirdo and Humanly Possible. The band released their third studio album, Humanly Possible, on May 3, 2011.

== Members ==
=== Current members ===
- Dirk Rogers – vocals
- Caleb Schneider – bass, vocals
- Carlos Neri – drums
- Chris McCarthy – guitar

=== Former members ===
- Keith Aazami — guitar, vocals
- James Garren – drums
- Phil Hernandez – drums (Formerly of Sepsism, currently with The Dead Previal)
- Chris Mackie – bass
- Jose Perez – drums
- Damian Talmadge – bass
- Mike Thrashead — drums
- Joe Whitehouse – guitar

== Discography ==
=== Studio albums ===
- 1999: For the Weird by the Weird (reissued on Serjical Strike Records in 2004)
- 2004: Lynch the Weirdo
- 2011: Humanly Possible
- 2015: Worship of Fear
- 2022: Taught to Fear
- 2025: Decency Anomaly

=== EPs ===
- 2009: Symbiotic Slavery

=== 7-inch EPs ===
- 1995: B.A.T. Live at the Fudge: one sided split with anyone
- 1999: Remember EP
- B.A.T. split with Laceration
- 1995: B.A.T. split with Agathocles
- B.A.T. split with Kung-fu Rick
- 2000: B.A.T. split with Benümb
- 2002: Tango and Thrash B.A.T. split with Municipal Waste

=== Tape demos ===
- 1989–1992: 12 Pack and a Dime Demo
- 1993: 4-Ken Demo
- 1994: Live at the Hong Kong
- 1995: Bad Acid Trip Demo
- 1997: Live Love Songs for Repressed Apes

=== Other appearances ===
- Dirk Rogers and Keith Aazami both appear on the songs "Funbus" and "Nottingham Lace" on the Buckethead & Friends album Enter the Chicken.
