= Figure It Out (Serj Tankian song) =

Single by Serj Tankian

from the album Harakiri
- Released: May 1, 2012
- Recorded: Serjical Strike studios, Los Angeles, California
- Genre: Nu metal
- Length: 2:52
- Label: Serjical Strike, Reprise
- Songwriter(s): Serj Tankian
- Producer(s): Serj Tankian

Serj Tankian singles chronology
"Reconstructive Demonstrations" (2010)	"Figure It Out" (2012)	"Cornucopia" (2012)

"Figure It Out" is a song by the rock musician Serj Tankian. The song was released as the lead single from his third solo album Harakiri.

== Reception ==
Writing for Artist Direct, Rick Florino complemented the opening guitar, stating "[it] slashes intensely as the legend's poetry rises and falls with the inflection of his voice." Iaan Robinson of CraveOnline also praised the track and compared it to Tankian's work in System of a Down.

Consequence of Sound reviewer Adam Kivel criticized the line "Why pretend that we don’t know/ that CEOs are the disease?" for "attempting to force issues into the listener's face". Steve Lepore of PopMatters was also less than enthusiastic about the track, calling the talk-singing sections of the song cliche.

== Music video ==
A lyric video was released for the song on May 1, 2012, the same day as the single release. The song's official music video was later released on May 25, and was directed by Ara Soudijian.

== Track listing ==
Australian promo single

No.	Title	Length
1.	"Fuck, Let's Figure It Out" (Dirty Version)	2:52
2.	"Figure It Out" (Clean Version)	2:52

American promo single

No.	Title	Length
1.	"Figure It Out" (Clean Version)	2:52
2.	"Figure It Out" (Dirty Version)	2:52

7" single

Side one
No.	Title	Length
1.	"Figure It Out"	2:52

Side two
No.	Title	Length
1.	"Revolver"	2:31

European promo single

No.	Title	Length
1.	"Figure It Out"	2:53

== Chart positions ==
Chart (2012)	Peak positions
US Main.	17
US Rock	44

== Personnel ==
- Serj Tankian – vocals
- Dan Monti – guitar
- Mario Pagliarulo – bass
- Troy Zeigler – drums
