= Glaring Through Oblivion =

2011 book by Serj Tankian

- Author: Serj Tankian
- Illustrator: Roger Kupelian
- Cover artist: Sako Shahinian
- Language: English
- Genre: Poetry
- Publisher: HarperCollins
- Publication date: March 22, 2011
- Publication place: China
- Pages: 128
- ISBN: 978-0-06-201205-0
- OCLC: 641532445
- Preceded by: Cool Gardens

Glaring Through Oblivion is a 2011 book of poetry written by Serj Tankian, the American lead singer of the band System of a Down. It is his second book of poetry, after Cool Gardens (2002). Glaring Through Oblivion was published by HarperCollins Publishers and printed in China, and released on March 22, 2011.

The book begins with a prose essay, written several days after the September 11 attacks, about how Tankian feared to speak his opinions because of threats against him and his band, after he had written an essay two days after the attacks in which he blamed United States foreign policy for terrorism. The prose ends with Serj promising "I, myself, have vowed to never ever again hold my tongue."

Some of the poems contain lyrics that ended up in some of his songs, although sometimes a bit modified. Some poems consist of only one line and do not have a title. The last poem in the book, "Borders", actually was to become a whole song on his second album Imperfect Harmonies; the song "Borders Are..." contains elements of that poem as well as from several poems from cool gardens.

== Poem listing ==
- A few days after September 11th (prose)
- Deaf Nation
- Down with the System
- The Hand
- Civilization
- Countless Manipulations
- We intend to rest through motion, speak through silence, and fight through peace.
- The Fool
- Antwerp Melting
- Remote Viewing
- World of Words
- Blindness serves not God, but man.
- #82
- Vermillion
- Home is a place you can't walk away from, in the end.
- You speak to millions but talk to no one.
- Lovely in love, ugly in death, better than sex in Turkish prisons, safer than cement condoms.
- The messenger speaks through chaos
- Los Angeles
- Dates, Rates, Plates, Fates, Mates, and Kates
- I'm being chased by children playing miniature toy accordions made in China.
- The Void (was already published in Cool Gardens)
- Life Savers (already on Cool Gardens)
- She sells sea shells, buy the real whore!
- The blind man cannot see all the marchers on the opposite side.
- Salivation
- I adore the whore who calls herself reality.
- Claustrophobia
- Uncertainty
- Condemned
- The Teacher
- The Nerves of Them
- Spare Me the Night
- Poisoning Poseidon
- Fancy fucking you here!
- Nothing
- Diatribe Trivialities
- Picture Frame
- Undying Form
- Bottled Water
- Soon
- The Silk Weaver
- Life is a potato pancake being eaten by fireflies in the middle of Ohio.
- Time
- Heretics
- The Incandescent Pause
- Awareness
- Forgot to Remember
- Praying for Peace
- Encore, you whore, get us more of that unfailing drink we called for.
- Borders
