= Orca Symphony No. 1 =

Studio album by Serj Tankian
- Released: June 25, 2013
- Recorded: October 27, 2012 at Brucknerhaus, Linz, Austria
- Genre: Classical
- Length: 34:00
- Label: Reprise, Serjical Strike
- Producer: Serj Tankian

Serj Tankian chronology
Harakiri (2012)	Orca Symphony No. 1 (2013)	Elasticity (2021)

Orca Symphony No. 1 is the fourth studio album by Armenian-American musician Serj Tankian. The album takes the form of a classical symphony. A professionally sampled studio version was released on November 30, 2012, while the live recorded version was released on June 25, 2013, through Serjical Strike Records.

A sample of the first act of the album was released on Tankian's SoundCloud page in May 2012.

== Background ==
Tankian achieved fame as part of the Armenian rock band System of a Down. Although the band experimented with various sounds, it wasn't until the band went on hiatus in 2006 that Tankian began to launch his solo career and experiment further.

Tankian's experimentation with classical composition began with Elect the Dead Symphony. The live album featured the Auckland Philharmonia Orchestra performing reworked versions of songs from Tankian's debut album Elect the Dead. His second album, Imperfect Harmonies, blended classical with traditional rock elements. Tankian described the album as "music that has sat in the vat and matured", referring to the album's influences from several genres.

Orca Symphony No. 1, however, is his first complete symphony. The album is structured into four acts that were composed using "non-traditional approaches to classical music." According to Tankian, "Orca is known as the killer whale, but is really a dark dolphin, a symbolism for human dichotomy."

== Track listing ==
No.	Title	Length
1.	"Act I - Victorious Orcinus"	8:45
2.	"Act II - Oceanic Subterfuge"	8:05
3.	"Act III - Delphinus Capensis"	7:58
4.	"Act IV - Lamentation of the Beached"	8:53
Total length:		34:00
