= Elect the Dead Symphony =

Live album by Serj Tankian
- Released: March 9, 2010
- Recorded: March 16, 2009 at the Auckland Town Hall, Auckland, New Zealand
- Genre: Art rock, progressive rock, classical
- Length: 1:03:00 (DVD); 54:54 (CD)
- Label: Reprise/Warner Bros./Serjical Strike
- Producer: Tom Whalley

Serj Tankian chronology
Lie Lie Live (2008)	Elect the Dead Symphony (2010)	Imperfect Harmonies (2010)

Singles from Elect the Dead Symphony
- 1. "The Charade" Released: February 15, 2010

Professional ratings
Review scores
Source	Rating
Allmusic	4/5 stars

Elect the Dead Symphony is the first live album by System of a Down frontman Serj Tankian. It is available in CD, CD/DVD, LP, and Digital Download formats. It features the Auckland Philharmonia Orchestra, along with Dan Monti on acoustic guitar and backing vocals, performing at the Auckland Town Hall in Auckland, New Zealand. Orchestral arrangements were by John Psathas. Material for the performance is from Tankian's solo debut, Elect the Dead with some additional previously unreleased songs.

== Release ==
Elect the Dead Symphony was released on February 23, 2010 on iTunes and March 9, 2010 in all other formats.

The album was accompanied by the release of the single "The Charade" (previously known as "Charades"). It became available prior to Elect the Dead Symphony, although the rock version was found only in the album's DVD closing credits. The orchestral version featured on the album's CD is included in the single as a B-side on some versions. Its live debut took place in 2004 on the Axis of Justice tour. Here, the song was performed as a piano piece with vocals. This version appeared on Axis of Justice: Concert Series Volume 1 as "Charades". "Charades" was later considered for release on System of a Down's Mezmerize/Hypnotize double album. Footage found on the DualDisc version of Hypnotize shows the band recording it, but the song didn't make the final release. In 2007, after System of a Down went on hiatus, Tankian began performing as a solo artist backed by the Flying Cunts of Chaos.

The subsequent Elect the Dead tour marked the song's debut in the arrangement later found on the single. The orchestral arrangement made its debut during the Elect the Dead Symphony tour under its new title "The Charade". The album was intended as a reimagining of songs from Elect the Dead, though neither "The Charade" nor "Gate 21" were featured on the original album. "Gate 21", however, saw a studio release on Tankian's next album.

== Music video ==
A video of Tankian performing the orchestral version of "The Charade" was included on the Elect the Dead Symphony DVD. A video of the orchestral version of "Empty Walls", also found on the DVD, was uploaded to Serj's YouTube account. The featured version was released as a B-side on some versions of the single.

== Track listing ==
All tracks are written by Serj Tankian.

No.	Title	Length
1.	"Feed Us"	7:29
2.	"Blue"	3:15
3.	"Sky Is Over"	3:09
4.	"Lie Lie Lie"	3:58
5.	"Money"	3:29
6.	"Baby"	3:41
7.	"Gate 21"	2:49
8.	"The Charade"	4:30
9.	"Honking Antelope"	3:49
10.	"Saving Us"	4:55
11.	"Elect the Dead"	3:08
12.	"Falling Stars"	3:24
13.	"Beethoven's Cunt"	3:29
14.	"Empty Walls"	3:57
15.	"The Charade" (studio version; DVD only during credits)	3:33
Total length:		1:03:00

== Chart positions ==
Chart (2010)	Peak position
Austrian Albums (Ö3 Austria)	38
French Albums (SNEP)	118
Greek Albums (IFPI)	5
New Zealand Albums (RMNZ)	12
Swiss Albums (Schweizer Hitparade)	64
