= Elasticity (EP) =

EP by Serj Tankian
- Released: March 19, 2021
- Genres: Nu metal, alternative metal
- Length: 20:49
- Labels: Alchemy; BMG
- Producer: Serj Tankian

Serj Tankian chronology
Orca Symphony No. 1 (2013)	Elasticity (2021)	Perplex Cities (2022)

Elasticity is the third EP by American metal singer Serj Tankian, released on 19 March 2021 by Alchemy Recordings and BMG.

== Background ==
The EP is made up of five songs Tankian had originally written several years earlier, for a possible System of a Down reunion album that did not come to pass because the other members of the band did not see "eye-to-eye" on their suitability. Tankian decided to record the tracks himself with engineers Vlado Meller and Dan Monti and release them under his own name, expecting this action to allow the band to move forward. It is Tankian's first album of original rock and heavy metal-based songs since Harakiri in 2012.

The album was expected to be released in fall 2020, but was delayed due to renewed strife between Armenia and Azerbaijan; Tankian instead spent that period engaged in international awareness efforts. The album features some lyrics referencing the 2021 documentary film Truth to Power, which chronicles Tankian's efforts to gain international recognition for the Armenian Genocide. The title track "Elasticity" was released as an advance single and features a music video directed by Vlad Kaptur. The song "Rumi" is about Tankian's son and the Persian poet of the same name.

== Reception ==
Kerrang! noted that the EP is "a fascinating insight into what a new album [by System of a Down] might have sounded like, through the lens of its most musically adventurous member", while Metal Hammer also noted the creative deviations from that band's expected sounds. In the words of Paste Magazine, the EP should mostly satisfy fans of System of a Down, but adds enough new elements to make it Tankian's own work. Blabbermouth called the EP "tremendously eclectic" while praising Tankian as "an incredibly talented and brilliant creative force". Loudwire called the album's title track "delightfully weird" with possible influences from surf rock and new wave.

== Track listing ==
All tracks are written by Serj Tankian.

No.	Title	Length
1.	"Elasticity"	4:01
2.	"Your Mom"	3:19
3.	"How Many Times?"	4:16
4.	"Rumi"	5:28
5.	"Electric Yerevan"	3:46
Total length:		20:52
