= Imperfect Remixes =

EP by Serj Tankian
- Released: March 1, 2011
- Genre: Art rock, symphonic rock
- Length: 15:29
- Label: Serjical Strike

Serj Tankian chronology
Imperfect Harmonies (2010)	Imperfect Remixes (2011)	Harakiri (2012)

Imperfect Remixes is an EP by Armenian-American singer Serj Tankian, released on March 1, 2011, featuring edited remixes from his previous album, Imperfect Harmonies, which was released in September 2010. This compilation features Tom Morello, providing the rock remix of "Goodbye – Gate 21". The album also has an extra B-side from the Imperfect Harmonies sessions, entitled "Goddamn Trigger".

== Music video ==
A music video for "Goodbye - Gate 21" was released on February 28, 2011. It features Serj Tankian, Tom Morello, the FCC, and an unidentified girl. Scenes of the band playing are interspersed with shots of the girl in various states of emotion. The video ends with the girl carrying a suitcase down a corridor. Ara Soudjian and George Tonikian directed the video.

== Track listing ==
No.	Title	Length
1.	"Goodbye – Gate 21" (Rock Remix, featuring Tom Morello)	3:41
2.	"Reconstructive Demonstrations" (Rock Remix)	4:06
3.	"Invisible Love – Deserving?" (Electro Remix)	4:22
4.	"Goddamn Trigger" (Non-Album Track)	3:20
Total length:		15:29
