= Harakiri (album) =

Studio album by Serj Tankian
- Released: July 10, 2012
- Studios: Serjical Strike Studios, Los Angeles
- Genres: Alternative rock, alternative metal
- Length: 45:18
- Labels: Reprise; Serjical Strike
- Producer: Serj Tankian

Serj Tankian chronology
Imperfect Remixes (2011)	Harakiri (2012)	Orca Symphony No. 1 (2013)

Serj Tankian studio album chronology
Imperfect Harmonies (2010)	Harakiri (2012)	Orca Symphony No. 1 (2013)

Singles from Harakiri
- 1. "Figure It Out" Released: May 1, 2012; 2. "Cornucopia" Released: June 4, 2012; 3. "Harakiri" Released: July 2012

Harakiri is the third studio album by System of a Down frontman Serj Tankian. It was released on July 10, 2012 as a follow-up to his 2010 album Imperfect Harmonies.

The album also constitutes the first of four then-upcoming albums, the other three being Orca, Jazz-Iz-Christ and Fuktronic.

== Background ==
Tankian has described the album as "the most up-tempo punk rock oriented record that I've written probably since the System days." In the same interview, he also confirmed that a 2013 world tour would likely follow in support of the album.

Hara-kiri, also known as seppuku, is a term for the ritual 'honour' suicide of Japanese samurai, with the former term being more common in speech and the latter being more literary, upper-class, and formal. The act involves self-disembowelment with a tantō (a Japanese-style dagger originating in the Heian period), slicing the abdomen from left to right. The album explores ideas of animal suicide.

== Recording and composition ==
As his two previous releases, the album was produced by Tankian himself at his own studio in Los Angeles. Harakiri differs from previous releases as three songs featured in it were initially sketched out on Tankian's iPad. He has himself declared that "we must trick ourselves into writing in different ways to get unexpected results".

"Weave On" was originally written for Prometheus Bound, a musical by Steven Sater. The work was inspired by Aeschylus' tragedy of the same name.

== Release and reception ==
Professional ratings
Aggregate scores
Source	Rating
Metacritic	65/100
Review scores
Source	Rating
AllMusic	3/5 stars
Artistdirect	5/5 stars
Consequence of Sound	3/5 stars
CraveOnline	4/5 stars
PopMatters	2/5 stars
Spin	3/5 stars
Sputnikmusic	3.5/5 stars

Harakiri was released on July 10, 2012. Three singles were officially released from the album: "Figure It Out" on May 1, "Cornucopia" on June 4 and the title song "Harakiri" on June 20. "Uneducated Democracy" was also made available for streaming on Record Store Day. The whole album was streamed at Red Bull USA on July 2, eight days before its release.

== Music videos ==
Two live action music videos were released for the album. The first, "Figure It Out", was released on May 25. The video features Tankian and members of the public protesting, while businessmen celebrate a bailout. Towards the end, the protesters break into the meeting. The second, "Harakiri", was released on July 11. The video includes quotes from Jean-Paul Sartre and Ralph Waldo Emerson alongside statements on animal suicide, GM crops and obesity, among other issues.

An animated video for "Occupied Tears" was also released on July 11 while another animated video, for "Uneducated Democracy", was released on July 19.

== Track listing ==
All songs written and composed by Serj Tankian, except where noted.

No.	Title	Length
1.	"Cornucopia"	4:28
2.	"Figure It Out"	2:52
3.	"Ching Chime"	4:05
4.	"Butterfly"	4:10
5.	"Harakiri"	4:19
6.	"Occupied Tears"	4:22
7.	"Deafening Silence"	4:16
8.	"Forget Me Knot"	4:26
9.	"Reality TV"	4:09
10.	"Uneducated Democracy"	3:59
11.	"Weave On" (lyrics by Steven Sater)	4:07
Total length:		45:18

Japanese edition bonus track
No.	Title	Length
12.	"Revolver"	2:31
Total length:		47:49

Deluxe edition bonus tracks
No.	Title	Length
12.	"Revolver"	2:31
13.	"Tyrant's Gratitude" (lyrics by Sater)	2:38
Total length:		50:27

== Personnel ==
- Serj Tankian – composing, lyricism, producing, vocals, all instruments
- Dan Monti – guitar, audio mixing, audio engineering
- Mario Pagliarulo – bass
- Troy Zeigler – drums
- Vlado Meller – mastering

== Chart positions ==
Chart (2012)	Peak position
Australian Albums (ARIA)	86
Austrian Albums (Ö3 Austria)	10
Belgian Albums (Ultratop Flanders)	128
Belgian Albums (Ultratop Wallonia)	39
Canadian Albums (Billboard)	15
Finnish Albums (Suomen virallinen lista)	16
French Albums (SNEP)	37
German Albums (Offizielle Top 100)	12
Italian Albums (FIMI)	36
Japanese Album Charts (Oricon)	84
New Zealand Albums (RMNZ)	27
Polish Albums (ZPAV)	14
Spanish Albums (Promusicae)	66
Swiss Albums (Schweizer Hitparade)	13
UK Albums (Official Charts)	87
UK Rock & Metal Albums (Official Charts)	3
US Billboard 200	29
US Top Alternative Albums (Billboard)	7
US Top Hard Rock Albums (Billboard)	3
US Indie Store Album Sales (Billboard)	17
