= Viza =

American band

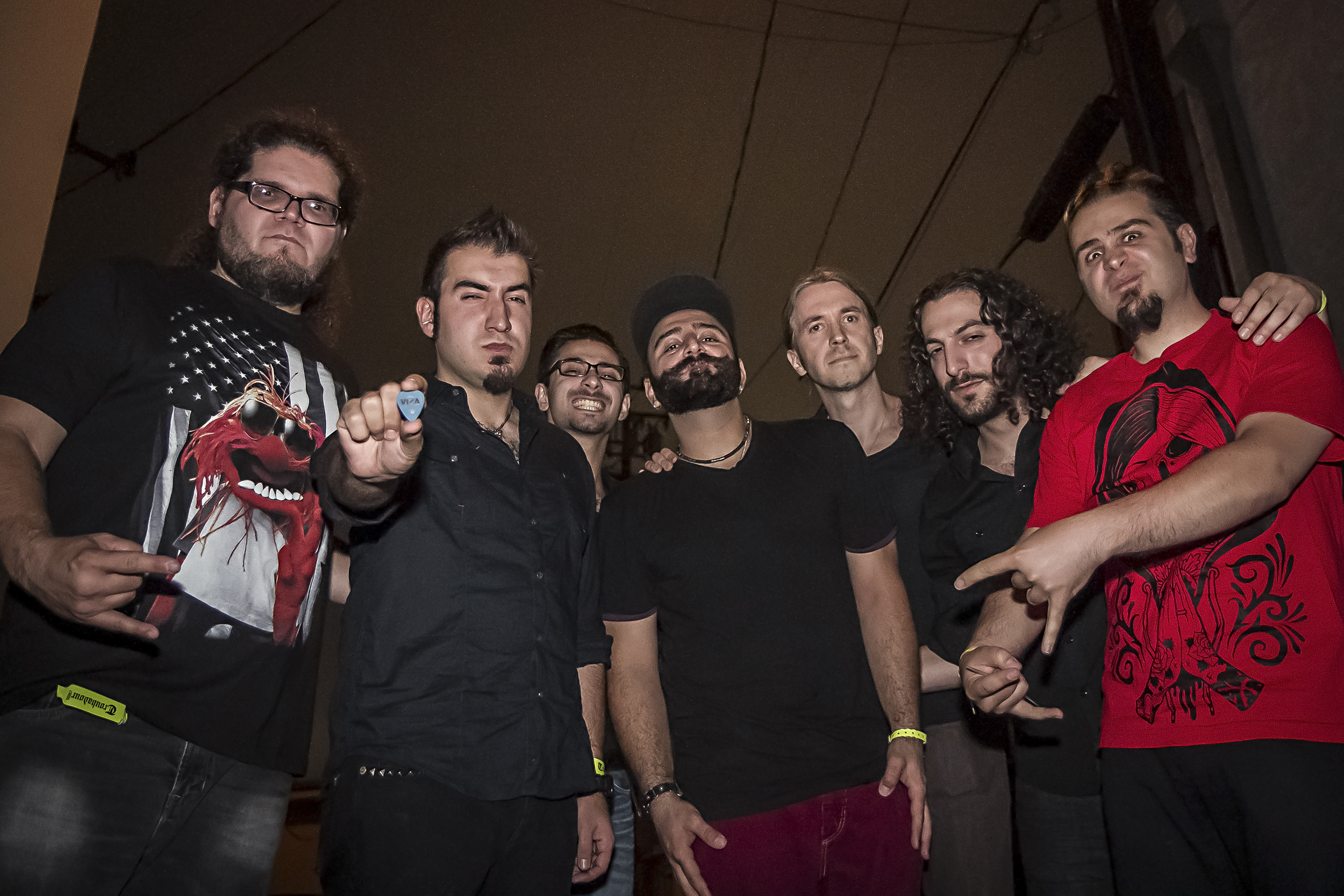

Background information
- Also known as: Visa (2000–2009)
- Origin: Los Angeles, California
- Genres: Alternative metal; experimental rock; hard rock; gypsy punk; world music
- Years active: 2000–2014; 2017–present
- Labels: Serjical Strike Records, Architects of Melody Records, SoundsUP records
- Members: K'noup Tomopoulos; Shant Bismejian; Andrew (Antranig) Kzirian; Alexan Khatcherian; Chris Daniel; Jivan Gasparyan Jr.
- Website: experienceviza.com

Viza (stylized as VI·ZA; formerly known as Visa) is an American rock band from Los Angeles, California, formed in 2000. The band is inspired by traditional Armenian and Greek music, which includes instruments like the oud and duduk. The band has released various EPs and albums. The band has recorded and performed with Serj Tankian of System of a Down, who managed the band.

== Performances and releases ==
Viza was associated with Serjical Strike Management, headed by Serj Tankian from System of a Down from 2009 to 2012, also featuring Tankian as a guest vocalist on their song "Viktor". In August 2010, Viza embarked on a series of introductory performances in Europe, opening for Serj Tankian's "Imperfect Harmonies" Tour in the cities of Yerevan, Athens, Hamburg, Cologne, Paris, Zurich, and Bologna. Viza accompanied Serj Tankian again during his "Harakiri" World Tour in the fall of 2012, as the main support act for 19 shows throughout North America and Europe.

== Discography ==
=== Studio albums ===
- 2006 – Maktub (as Visa)
- 2008 – Eros (as Visa)
- 2010 – Made in Chernobyl
- 2011 – Carnivalia
- 2014 – Aria

=== EPs ===
- 2001 – Visa (as Visa)
- 2007 – De Facto (as Visa)
- 2018 – The Unorthodox Revival I
- 2018 – The Unorthodox Revival II

=== Singles ===
- 2011 – "Bake Me in Clouds"
- 2012 – "Alabama Song (Whisky Bar)" (Bertolt Brecht, Kurt Weill)
- 2013 – "In Coins2
- 2014 – "Midnight Hour"
- 2014 – "Fuego"
- 2014 – "When Doves Cry" (Prince)
- 2014 – "Naive Melody" (Talking Heads)
- 2019 – "Eros"
- 2020 – "Loyal Tea"
- 2022 – "Yesterday"
- 2023 – "Ms. Information"
- 2023 – "Thunderbolt"
- 2023 – "Maggie Mae's Tavern"
- 2023 – "Avec Toi" (From Paris with Love)
- 2023 – "Llama"
- 2023 – "Dingle"
- 2026 – "MAZO"

== Band members ==
- K'noup Tomopoulos – vocals, guitar
- Shant Bismejian – electric guitar
- theoudplayer (Andrew Kzirian) – oud, electric oud, saz, vocals
- Alex (Alexan) Khatcherian – bass, vocals
- Chris Daniel – drums, percussion, vocals
- Jivan Gasparyan Jr. – duduk

Former

- Johnny Nice – guitar, keyboards
- Carlos Alvarado – guitar
- Danny Shamoun – percussion
- Suguru Onaka – keyboards, accordion
- Hiram Rosario – drums
- Orbel Babayan – electric guitar, tar, saz, vocals
