= Animal suicide =

Intentional end of an animal's own life

Animal suicide is when an animal intentionally ends its own life through its actions. It implies a wide range of higher cognitive capacities that experts have been wary to ascribe to nonhuman animals such as a concept of self, death, and future intention. There is currently not enough empirical data on the subject for there to be a consensus among experts. For these reasons, the occurrence of animal suicide is controversial among academics.

While it has not been proven that non-human animals do, or even can, die by suicide, many animals behave in ways that may seem suicidal. There are anecdotes of animals refusing to eat in periods of grief or stress. Some social insects have been known to defend their colony by sacrificing themselves. Other animals are victims of parasites that are known to alter the behavior of their host to complete their lifecycle, which results in the host's death.

== Controversy ==
Whether an animal has the cognitive capability to commit suicide is highly debated. Many people have opposing views on what is considered suicide. It is often argued if animals commit suicide due to environmental factors or if they do it in a manner of self defense. An example of this would be bees, as it is argued over whether bees are purposefully committing suicide or just defending their hives and oblivious that stinging will cause death. The concept of animal suicide has progressed over time, so there is also controversy over whether animal suicide is just humans anthropomorphizing animals or evolutionary traits that appear over time. Currently, animal suicide has not been proven, however the topic is highly debated by scholars, psychologists, and animal behaviorists alike.

== Characteristics ==
There are yet to be definitive, unanimously agreed upon instances of non-human animal suicide. This is due to the many components of suicide which are difficult to empirically observe without interpretation bias. An animal would need to be aware of its own existence as distinct from other individuals. It would need to have an understanding of mortality and sufficient for it to realize that it is a possibility. To choose death for itself, the animal has to know about itself and that it can die. It would also need some concept of the future in order to intend to die. Each of these requisites has been studied independently, and there is some evidence of some animals being capable of each. The mirror test is currently used to determine whether an animal has a concept of self. Some animals, such as some species of cetaceans and primates, are believed to grasp the concept of death enough to mourn members of the same species. Other species such as elephants will also mourn the death of loved ones and experience grief, often rubbing their trunks against remains and burying them with dirt.

Some animals, such as octopuses, stop eating food and waste away after reproducing, seemingly losing any desire to live. As this is a genetically programmed behavior that all individuals of the species engage in, it is not intentional and therefore cannot be considered suicide.

=== Animal model of suicide ===
Several risk-factors for suicide, such as addiction, depression, and PTSD, have already been modeled independently in animals. They have also been used to model endophenotypes that are associated with suicide. These animal models allow scientists to study the neuroscience behind these disorders as well as explore potential treatments. While demonstrating animal suicide itself in a lab is believed to be possible by some, the ethics of driving an animal to kill itself are debated. In the field, it can be difficult to not only find examples of suicide, but to be certain that the death was intentional, not accidental.

== Suicidal behavior ==
=== Stress-related self-destructive behavior ===
Many animals that appear to be depressed or grieving begin to exhibit self-destructive behavior that sometimes ends in death, but this is not considered suicide, as the achieving of death was not necessarily the purpose or objective of the behaviors.

A 1845 newspaper ran stories on dogs, as well as ducks, that had also allegedly drowned themselves, although the veracity or certainty of these cases is disputed. In one of the alleged cases, one duck did so after the death of its mate.

An example of an alleged case of animal suicide is the case of the dolphin which most often portrayed Flipper on the 1960s television show Flipper. According to trainer Ric O'Barry in the film The Cove, Kathy, the dolphin, suffocated herself before him. The veracity or accuracy of this case has not been established in rigorous, scientific or objective terms. Similarly, a male bottle nose dolphin named Peter who was a subject in a series of experiments led by John C. Lilly, a neuroscientist, and Margaret Howe Lovatt, a volunteer naturalist, apparently stopped breathing after he was moved to a lab in a different location and separated from Lovatt.

Some dogs will refuse food from some unknown person after the death of their owner, a behavior that might lead to disease or death in severe cases. The death of mourning animals is likely to be caused by depression leading to starvation or drowning, instead of the intent of suicide.

Aristotle described an unverified story involving one of the King of Scythia's horses dying by suicide after having been made to unwittingly impregnate its mother in his History of Animals.

Other cases of animals engaging in stress-related self-destructive behavior include birds engaging in feather-plucking, as well dogs and cats engaging in excessive licking.

=== Group defense ===
==== Autothysis ====
Some species of social insects will die by suicide in an act of altruism through autothysis. These insects will sacrifice themselves if the colony is in danger, to alert the colony of danger, or if they become diseased. Carpenter ants and some species of termite will rupture glands and expel a sticky toxic substance thought to be an aliphatic compound. Termites will use autothysis to defend their colony, as the ruptured gland produces a sticky harmful secretion that leads to a tar baby effect in defense. Another example is the Camponotus saundersi, or Malaysian worker ant, which is capable of dying by suicide by exploding.

==== Stinging ====
Honeybees use their stinger to deliver poisonous chemicals to their attacker, effectively injuring the predator and killing the insect in the colony's defense. This self-destructive and often altruistic defense is known as sting autonomy. The stinger is easily torn from the animal's body, leaving the hazardous stinger stuck in the predator. Honey bees are the only bees to die after stinging.

=== Maladaptive behavior ===
==== Migration ====
Lemmings are known to migrate when the population in their area becomes too large for its food supply. During these migrations, some will swim to cross bodies of water, but not all of them will make it back to land alive. This unfortunate consequence of migration has sometimes been perceived as an act of mass suicide. This myth has been popularized in various media.

=== Interference ===
==== Parasitism ====
Certain types of parasites will cause their hosts to engage in suicidal behavior, through altering how the intermediate host acts, but this is not considered suicide (at least not considered suicide in a psychological or ethological sense). The change in the host's actions often benefit the parasite's search for a final host. A main example is the phylum Acanthocephala, which will direct its host to a predator so as to be eaten by the predator, their new definitive host. The parasitic worm Spinochordodes tellinii will develop in grasshoppers and crickets until it is grown, at which time it will cause its host to leap into water to its death so that the worm can reproduce in water. However, S. tellinii only causes its host to drown when the host is already close to water as opposed to seeking it out over large distances.

Infection with Toxoplasma gondii has been shown to alter the behavior of mice and rats in ways thought to increase the rodents' chances of being preyed upon by cats— a desirable eventuality for the parasite as members of the cat family (felidae) are the only known definitive hosts in which this parasite may undergo sexual reproduction. Infected rodents show a reduction in their innate aversion to cat odors; while uninfected mice and rats will generally avoid areas marked with cat urine or with cat body odor, this avoidance is reduced or eliminated in infected animals. Moreover, some evidence suggests this loss of aversion may be specific to feline odors: when given a choice between two predator odors (cat or mink), infected rodents show a significantly stronger preference to cat odors than do uninfected controls.

Suicide induction in intermediate hosts has been shown to help disperse the parasites to their final hosts. The intermediate host of Parvatrema affinis is the bivalve mollusc, Macoma balthica. The clams feed when in the sublittoral and tidal flat muds, and usually leave no conspicuous marks in the mud that could indicate their presence. However, infected clams are concentrated in the higher parts of the tidal flats, closer to shore, and leave conspicuous zig-zag markings in the sand. Visual and tactile cues have shown to be used by oyster catchers and other shore birds, the definitive hosts of the parasite.

== Example ==
=== Tarsiers ===
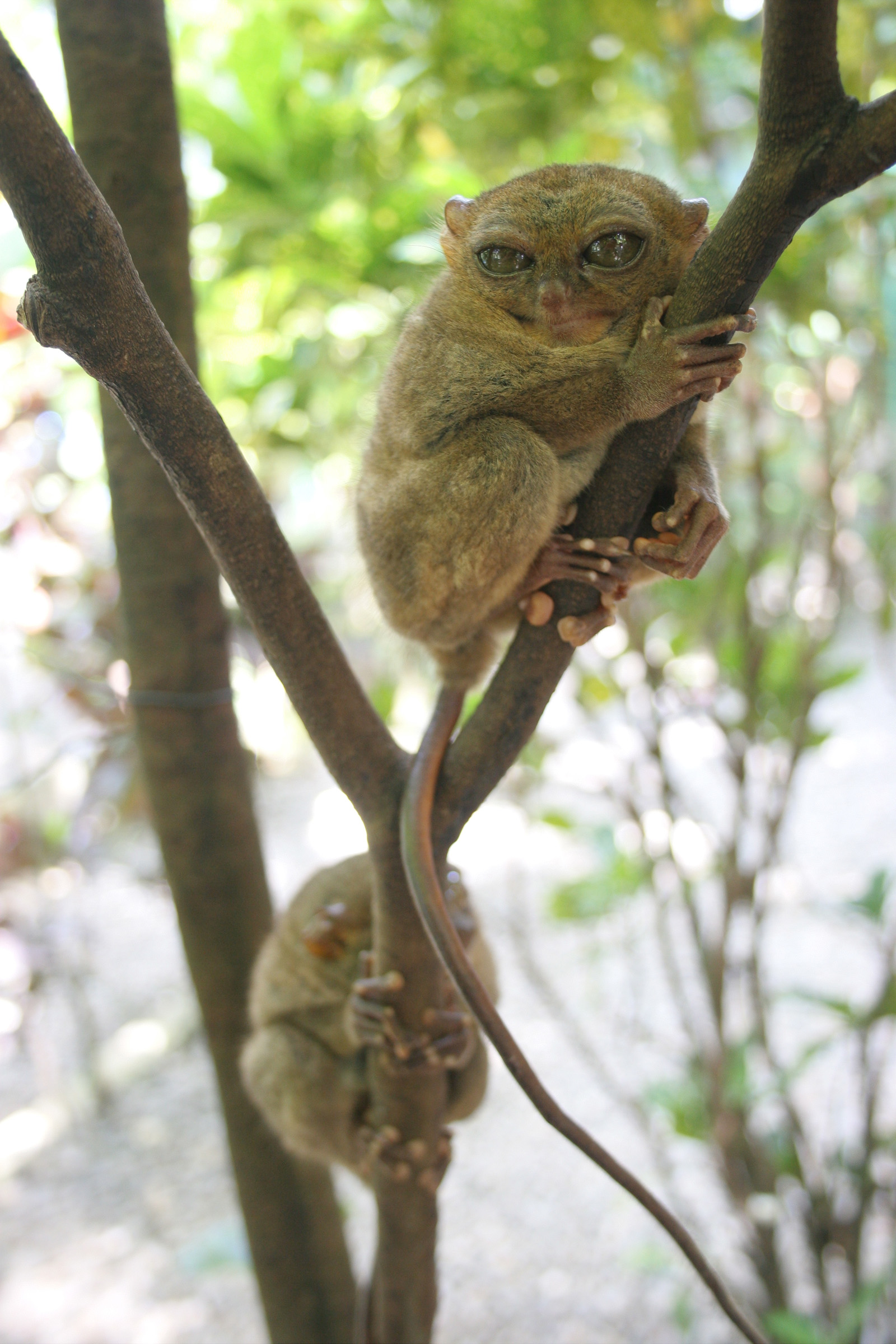
Tarsiers have been proposed to be capable of suicide

One of the proposed examples of animal suicide would most likely be the suicidal behavior of tarsiers that are kept in captivity. Tarsiers are nervous and shy by nature, and do not thrive in captivity. Many activities associated with captivity, such as camera flashes, being touched, and being kept in an enclosure, can stress the tarsiers. This stress can lead to sore eyes, which is an indication of a poor diet, and the lighting usually used in captivity can cause long-lasting damage to the eyes. When they feel too stressed out, they start beating their heads against hard surfaces, which leads to death.

== In media ==
A popular misconception is that the lemming will die by mass suicide during reproduction. This misconception was first popularized by media in the 1960s, such as a mention in the Cyril M. Kornbluth short story "The Marching Morons" in 1951 and the 1955 comic "The Lemming with the Locket", inspired by a 1953 American Mercury article. Perhaps one of the most influential factors in this misconception was the 1958 Academy Award-winning Disney film White Wilderness, which showed staged footage of lemmings jumping off a cliff during reproduction.

Werner Herzog's 2007 Academy Award-nominated documentary film Encounters at the End of the World features footage of a penguin marching away from the sea, going inland to its certain death. National Geographic dubbed the penguin "suicidal".

== See also ==
- Antipredator adaptation
- Self-destructive behavior
