= Madoff: The Monster of Wall Street =

2023 Netflix documentary

- Netflix documentary series poster
- Genre: Documentary; True crime
- Based on: Madoff Talks by Jim Campbell
- Developed by: Teresa Giordano
- Story by: Andrew Becker; Eleanor Yu
- Directed by: Joe Berlinger
- Starring: Elijah George; Joseph Scotto; Donna Pastorello; Sarah Kuklis; Isa Camyar; Cris Colicchio
- Music by: Serj Tankian
- Country of origin: United States
- Original language: English
- No. of seasons: 1
- No. of episodes: 4

Production
- Executive producers: Joe Berlinger; Jon Doran; Samantha Grogin; Jen Isaacson; Jon Kamen; Eve Rodrick
- Producers: Peter Bobrow; Axel Gerdau; Mika Lentz; Rachael Profiloski
- Cinematography: Jeff Hutchens
- Editors: Christopher Kronus; Josh Pearson; Victoria Toth; Timothy Ziegler
- Camera setup: Multi-camera
- Running time: 249 minutes (entire series)
- Production companies: RadicalMedia; Third Eye Motion Picture Company

Original release
- Network: Netflix
- Release: January 4, 2023

Madoff: The Monster of Wall Street is a 2023 American true crime documentary series directed by Joe Berlinger and based in part on the 2021 book Madoff Talks by Jim Campbell. The four-part series was produced by RadicalMedia in association with Third Eye Motion Picture Company for the streaming service Netflix and released in its entirety on January 4, 2023. It details how Bernie Madoff rose to power and, using former employees, investigators, journalists, victims, whistleblowers, and Madoff video depositions, unpacks the world's biggest Ponzi scheme while also laying blame on the many who saw an abundance of red flags but decided to shrug them off and look the other way.

== Backstory ==
While discussing the documentary series in an interview with journalist Hari Sreenivasan on the American global affairs television program Amanpour & Company, Berlinger stated, "[W]hat I really wanted to emphasize is the utter failure of the regulators." When asked about the never-before-seen footage of Madoff, he explained that it was graciously offered to him during an interview he did with attorney Helen Chaitman, who had deposed Madoff while representing many of the victims in clawback lawsuits.

== Plot summaries ==
=== A Liar, Not a Failure ===
The documentary series begins with Madoff's arrest and a historical context of his early life, including what led to his absolute determination not to be a failure like his father. It discusses how he began his career in penny stock trades and built a profitable side business that provided clients with impressive returns. With his brother Peter, they were able to pioneer computerized trading and the consolidation of off-the-exchange markets which eventually led to the formation of NASDAQ for which he would be on the Board of Governors.

=== Don't Ask, Don't Tell ===
In the second episode, we see the stark differences between the modern and pristine operation on the 19th floor of the Lipstick Building and what was transpiring on the relic and shopworn 17th floor, where Madoff was running his investment advisory business and where most of the fraud was orchestrated, and from where Madoff's empire branched into the hedge fund business, which began drawing unwanted scrutiny.

In his disposition, Madoff confirms the names of four significant investors, including Jeffry Picower, a shadowy and long-time client, dating back 30 years. Although Madoff never confronted Picower or discussed the matter with him, it was suspected he knew what was going on and, because of this, had the power to torment and extort Madoff while profiting substantially from his Ponzi scheme.

=== See No Evil ===
In the third episode, the focus shifts on how Madoff's numbers were unrealistic, and despite his competitors alerting the U.S. Securities and Exchange Commission, the agency, enamored by Madoff's reputation, chose to ignore all the red flags, preferring instead to look the other way and allow Madoff to continue.

=== The Price of Trust ===
In the final episode, we hear how employees on the 17th floor were rewarded, and we see Madoff's $65 billion Ponzi scheme quickly collapses as investors begin to withdraw their money during the 2008 financial crisis. We see how Madoff's sons attempt to stop their father from writing bonus cheques for long-time investors, faithful employees, and extended family to help cushion the blow. Madoff confesses to the Ponzi scheme, and the FBI arrests him.

After pleading guilty, Madoff is sentenced to 150 years in prison. Two years after learning of the Ponzi scheme, his eldest son Mark is found hanging from a pipe, dead of an apparent suicide. His other son dies of lymphoma six years later.

== Cast ==
- Darren Aponte as Andrew Cohen
- Diana B. Henriques as Self
- Stephanie Beauchamp as Jodi Crupi
- Gary Blum as Keith Kelly
- Isa Camyar as Frank DiPascali
- David Carraturo as Keith Kelly
- Chris Cartusciello as Steve Garfinkel
- Jerry Castillo as Saul Alpern
- Sammy Chang as Judge Denny Chin
- Cris Colicchio as Peter Madoff
- Kevin Delano as Andrew Madoff
- Bruce Dubinsky as Self
- Alicia Erlinger as Annette Bongiorno
- Paul Faggione as Jeffrey Tucker
- Leonid Feldman as Self
- Melony Feliciano as background extra
- Christopher Fey as Frank Casey
- Marla Freeman as Sonja Kohn
- Jordan Fried as Young Peter Madoff (Uncredited SEC Agent)
- Andrew Gelos as Michael Bienes
- Elijah George as 19th floor Trader
- Geoffrey Greene as Walter Noel
- Ellen Hales as Self
- Alex Hammerli as Madoff employee
- Amelia Hart as young Ruth Madoff
- Jason Hewitt as Trader
- Nicolai Kabana as Frank Avellino
- Michael Karlya as Harry Markopolos
- Sarah Kuklis as Ellen Hales
- Robert Loftus as 19th floor Trader
- Grant Lowenstein as young Bernie Madoff
- Charles Maranzano as Ira Sorkin
- Harry Markopolos as Self
- Alex Olson as Mark Madoff
- Ginger O'Toole as Ruth Madoff
- Donna Pastorello as Eleanor Squillari
- Ashley Rose Folino as Shana Madoff
- Howie Schaal as Jerry O'Hara
- Steve Schroko as René-Thierry Magon de la Villehuchet
- Joseph Scotto as Bernie Madoff
- Frank Sorgenti as Jeffry Picower
- Ira Sorkin as Self
- Sydney Speltz as Jamie Rosenberger
- Eleanor Squillari as Self
- Rafael Antonio Vasquez as George Perez
- Roland Ubaldo, U.S. Marshal as Roland Ubaldo, U.S. Marshal

== Production ==
Shooting for the series was done on stage rather than in traditional office space, which provided the crew with the means to more easily control the set when transitioning between scenes filmed in daylight and those created at night, all while using continuous shots. Interviews with some of Madoff's victims were done off-set in actual locations. During the 30 to 40 days of shooting spread over a few months, crew sizes varied from four to one hundred depending on the stage of production.

Netflix announced the series in October 2021 and that it would be made by filmmaker Joe Berlinger and would include access to "victims, whistleblowers, investigators, and archives," and that some of it would be based on Jim Campbell's 2021 book Madoff Talks: Uncovering the Untold Story Behind the Most Notorious Ponzi Scheme in History. Berlinger would later reveal that the series would include footage of Madoff's video depositions.

== Release ==
The four-part series, Madoff: The Monster of Wall Street, began streaming in its entirety on Netflix on January 4, 2023.

The soundtrack was released a week in advance by composer Serj Tankian. The album, entitled Madoff: The Monster of Wall Street (Soundtrack from the Netflix Series), includes 27 musical compositions from the series and was made available to stream on all major digital music platforms.

== Reception ==
Madoff: The Monster of Wall Street was generally well received. In The Wall Street Journal, John Anderson writes, "Among Mr. Berlinger's accomplishments in The Monster of Wall Street is not making the Madoff story remotely romantic, or even a parable, while at the same time putting blood in its veins." Brian Tallerico, editor of RogerEbert.com posts, "It's not as flashy as his serial killer exposes, but it does take a very complex issue and unpack it in a way that's easy to follow." In The Guardian, critic Chitra Ramaswamy includes, "Joe Berlinger's pacy four-parter treats the jaw-dropping story as a financial thriller, which makes sense." Nick Schager, entertainment critic for The Daily Beast, finds that "the docuseries is a stinting evisceration of a man and a culture that cared more about dollar signs than rules, ethics, or even loved ones."

On the Netflix Top 10 Most Viewed list, the series premiered at number two and was listed in the Top 10 in TV in twenty countries in the first week of 2023. On the review aggregator website Rotten Tomatoes, 90% of 10 critics' reviews are positive, with an average rating of 6.90/10. Metacritic, which uses a weighted average, assigned the film a score of 74 out of 100, based on 5 critics, indicating "generally favorable" reviews.

== See also ==
- Bernie Madoff – American financier and con artist (1938–2021)
- Madoff investment scandal – Investment scandal discovered in 2008
