= Serjical Strike Records =

American record label

- Parent company: Universal Music Group
- Founded: April, 2001
- Founder: Serj Tankian
- Distributor(s): Republic Records (In the US) EMI Records (Outside the US) Columbia Records and The Orchard (select releases) Woah Dad! and The Orchard (Serj Tankian releases)
- Genre: Rock
- Country of origin: US
- Official website: www.serjicalstrike.com/

Serjical Strike Records is an American record label, owned by Universal Music Group, and operates under Republic Records.

== Background ==
Serjical Strike was founded in April 2001 by Serj Tankian (lead singer of System of a Down), and has cast away the restrictions of large scale record labels to create a 'unique and imaginative' label that provides a large spectrum of musical talent. In the previous five years Serj and the team have signed various bands of differing styles; Bad Acid Trip, Kittens for Christian, Slow Motion Reign, and Fair to Midland, and at the same time a good relationship with Columbia records has been built up. Serj also worked with Arto Tuncboyaciyan on a collaboration album named Serart out of Serjical Strike. The live album/DVD Axis of Justice: Concert Series Volume 1 and the Buckethead & Friends' 2005 release Enter the Chicken were under the Serjical Strike label. Serj Tankian's debut solo album Elect the Dead was also on Serjical Strike Records in addition to Reprise Records. In August 2007 Serjical Strike started its own YouTube account.

With each release, the goal of our label is to create an oasis of diversity and uniqueness within the industry where fans of all music can find sanctuary and solace from the drab, carbon-copy musical plagues that sweep through commercial culture. With the ever-evolving consciousness of today's music fan, we hope to be an amoebic representation of the myriad of bands and musical styles that one person can enjoy. With each new band we sign, we hope that it becomes harder and harder to describe Serjical Strike Records as being anything other than an 'Arts Label'.

== Artists ==
=== Current artists ===
- Arto Tunçboyacıyan
- Axis of Justice
- Bad Acid Trip
- Buckethead
- The Cause
- Flying Cunts of Chaos
- Khatchadour Tankian
- Kittens for Christian
- Serart
- Serj Tankian (solo music)
- Slow Motion Reign
- Viza

=== Former artists ===
- Mt. Helium
- Armenian Navy Band
- Death by Stereo
- Fair to Midland
- Ontronik Khachaturian

== Releases ==
Year	Artist	Release	Notes
2003	Serart	Serart Sampler	Promotional release for Serart
2003	Serart	Serart	Re-released in 2009
2003	Kittens for Christian	Privilege of Your Company	
2004	Bad Acid Trip	For the Weird by the Weird	Reissue
2004	Bad Acid Trip	Lynch the Weirdo	
2004	Axis of Justice	Axis of Justice: Concert Series Volume 1	
2005	Buckethead & Friends	Enter the Chicken	Reissued in 2008
2006	Slow Motion Reign	Slow Motion Reign	
2006	Fair to Midland	The Drawn and Quartered EP	
2007	Fair to Midland	Fables from a Mayfly: What I Tell You Three Times Is True	
2007	Serj Tankian	Elect the Dead	
2008	Serj Tankian	Lie Lie Live	Rhapsody exclusive digital EP
2009	Death by Stereo	Death Is My Only Friend	
2009	Bad Acid Trip	Symbiotic Slavery	
2010	Serj Tankian	Elect the Dead Symphony	
2010	Serj Tankian	Imperfect Harmonies	
2012	Serj Tankian	Harakiri	
2013	Serj Tankian	Orca	
2013	Serj Tankian	Jazz-Iz-Christ	

Other albums available on the Serjical Strike website

- Bigelf — Money Machine

== See also ==
- List of record labels
