= Cool Gardens =

2002 poetry book by Serj Tankian

- Cover of the book
- Author: Serj Tankian
- Illustrator: Sako Shahinian
- Cover artist: Sako Shahinian
- Language: English
- Genre: Poetry
- Publisher: MTV
- Publication date: 2001
- Publication place: America
- English publication date: 2001
- Media type: Print (paperback), audiobook
- Pages: 96
- ISBN: 978-0-7434-5741-5
- OCLC: 50870079
- Dewey Decimal: 811/.6 22
- LC Class: PS3620.A686 C66 2002
- Followed by: Glaring Through Oblivion

Cool Gardens is a poetry book by the lead singer of the band System of a Down, Serj Tankian. It was published by MTV Books and was released on October 1, 2002. It is a collection of seven to eight years of Tankian's reflections on life, and features artwork by fellow Angeleno, Sako Shahinian. The poetry, like the songs of System of a Down, consists of a reflection of societies and people's wrongs. It portrays what people do to themselves and the control others try to hold over them.

The book has received much praise in the artistic community.

== Poem listing ==
- Prenatal Familiarities
- From Words To Portraits
- Mer
- Businessman vs. Homeless
- A Metaphor?
- Duty Free Fear
- Day Or Night
- Matter
- The Count
- Wet Flower
- Mercury
- City Of Blinds
- Compassion
- Brain Waves
- Compliment
- Rain
- Subatomic Music
- Days Inn
- Partial Moons
- Soil
- The Void
- Sun Bear
- Kevorkian Patient's Plee
- I Don't Want To Shower
- Desystemization
- Mix
- Information
- Silence
- Tars
- Nil
- Reality The Beautiful
- Jeffrey, Are You Listening?
- Freezing
- Pen
- Fermented Husbands
- Artco.
- Indentured Servitude
- Dawn
- Conquer?
- Circus Tiger
- Friik
- PsychiatryPsychiatry
- Orange Light
- Words Of A Madman
- My Words
- Misunderstood Rose
- Defeatism
- Children
- Prop. 192
- Child's Man
- I Am My Woman
- Overload
- Time For Bed
- Am
- Identity
- Permanently Plucked
- Shine
- Now
- Self Elimination
- New Ear
- Dr. Trance
- Puzzle
- Death
- A Mess
- Felix The Cat
- Revolution
- A Letter To Congress
- Data
- Minute Horizons
- Art
- Primrose
- Touche'
- Life Savers
- Nations
- One Word
- Lighter
- Addiction
- 12 Lives
- House Of Flies
- Cat Naps
- Culture
- NYC
- I Am Ready
- Her Eye
- Edge Of A Sink
- I'm Erica
- First Entry
- Flux

== Adaptations ==
On September 22, 2020, Cool Gardens was released as an unabridged audiobook, narrated by author, Tankian. The audiobook format has a runtime of one hour, six minutes. Three videos highlighting the spoken word versions of "Nil," "My Words," and "City of Blinds," featuring art and animation by Philadelphia-based artist D.S. Bradford, were released leading up to and after the audiobook's release.
