= Serart =

Studio album by Serj Tankian and Arto Tunçboyacıyan
- Released: May 6, 2003; April 21, 2009 (deluxe edition)
- Genres: Experimental; avant-garde; Armenian folk
- Length: 43:53; 51:39 (deluxe edition)
- Labels: Serjical Strike/Columbia; Serjical Strike (deluxe edition)
- Producers: Serj Tankian, Arto Tunçboyacıyan

Serj Tankian chronology
| Serart (2003) | Elect the Dead (2007) |

Arto Tunçboyacıyan chronology
| Aile Muhabbeti (2001) | Serart (2003) | Türkçe Sözlü Hafif Anadolu Müziği (2004) |

Professional ratings
Review scores
| Source | Rating |
|---|---|
| AllMusic | 4.5/5 stars |
| Entertainment Weekly | A− |

Serart is a collaboration album by the two Armenian musicians Serj Tankian ("Ser-"), lead singer of System of a Down, and folk multi-instrumentalist Arto Tunçboyacıyan ("-art"). It was the first release on Tankian's own label, Serjical Strike Records.

In 2008, Tunçboyacıyan confirmed in an interview that a second album was planned. However, due to heavy schedules and lack of prioritisation, the album was cancelled and "won't be recorded anytime soon."

The album was re-released in a deluxe edition on April 21, 2009, along with the short film "Sun Angle Calculator" and the two remixes from the Serart Sampler.

== Track listing ==
| No. | Title | Writer(s) | Length |
|---|---|---|---|
| 1. | "Intro" | Serj Tankian | 0:38 |
| 2. | "Cinema" | Tankian | 3:59 |
| 3. | "Devil's Wedding" | Arto Tunçboyacıyan | 4:08 |
| 4. | "The Walking Xperiment" | Tankian | 3:33 |
| 5. | "Black Melon" | Tunçboyacıyan | 3:36 |
| 6. | "Metal Shock" | Tunçboyacıyan | 0:31 |
| 7. | "Save the Blonde" | Tankian | 3:14 |
| 8. | "Love Is the Peace" | Tunçboyacıyan | 2:32 |
| 9. | "Leave Melody Counting Fear" | Tankian | 3:45 |
| 10. | "Gee-Tar" | Tankian | 1:11 |
| 11. | "Claustrophobia" | Tankian | 1:36 |
| 12. | "Narina" | Tunçboyacıyan, Jenna Ross | 5:31 |
| 13. | "Zumba" | Tunçboyacıyan | 0:53 |
| 14. | "Facing the Plastic" | Tankian | 3:46 |
| 15. | "If You Can Catch Me" | Tunçboyacıyan | 1:03 |
| 16. | "I Don't Want to Go Back Empty-Handed" | Tunçboyacıyan | 4:08 |
| 17. | "Facing the Plastic" (Mindless Self Indulgence Remix) (deluxe edition bonus track) | Tankian, Jimmy Urine | 3:56 |
| 18. | "Narina" (Bill Laswell Remix – Radio Edit) (deluxe edition bonus track) | Tunçboyacıyan, Ross | 3:50 |
| Total length: | | | 51:39 |

=== DVD ===
- Short film Sun Angle Calculator

== Serart Sampler ==
Serart Sampler is a promo sampler CD released by the band's label to promote the album.

=== Track listing ===
| No. | Title | Writer(s) | Length |
|---|---|---|---|
| 1. | "Serart Album Overture" (Special DJ Mix by Serj Tankian with samples from every track) | | 12:39 |
| 2. | "Narina" (Bill Laswell Remix — Radio Edit) | Tunçboyacıyan, Ross | 3:58 |
| 3. | "Facing the Plastic" (Mindless Self Indulgence Remix) | Tankian, Euringer | 3:50 |
| 4. | "EPK" | | 4:50 |
