= Axis of Justice =

American nonprofit organization

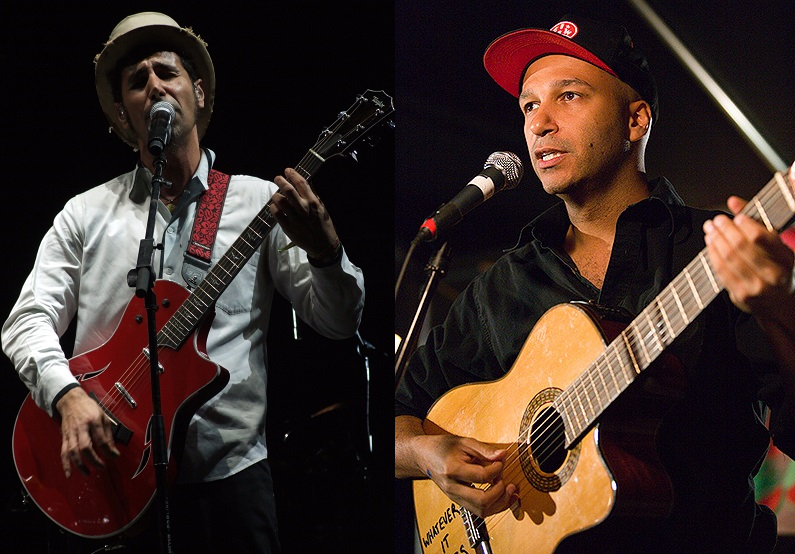
- Serj Tankian (left) and Tom Morello, the two founders

Background information
- Origin: Los Angeles, California, U.S.
- Genres: Alternative rock; experimental rock; alternative metal; alternative hip hop
- Years active: 2002–present
- Labels: Columbia, Serjical Strike, Axis of Justice
- Members: Serj Tankian; Tom Morello

Axis of Justice is a non-profit organization co-founded by Serj Tankian and Tom Morello in 2002. It was founded "to bring together musicians, fans of music, and grassroots political organizations to fight for social justice together." They "aim to build a bridge between fans of music around the world and local political organizations to effectively organize around issues of peace, human rights, and economic justice." The group has worked for such causes as immigrant rights and death penalty abolition. Its recommended book list includes such authors as Karl Marx, Che Guevara, George Orwell, Noam Chomsky, Mumia Abu-Jamal and Grant Morrison.

== History ==
In a 2003 interview, Tom Morello remarked that he formed Axis of Justice with Serj Tankian after witnessing some members of the audience at Ozzfest 2002 promoting racist symbols and imagery: "I was sitting there stuck in traffic on my way to the show, and I was really shocked at the number of people who were sporting SS and Klan tattoos. I was like, 'That’s just crazy, this is my music, too'."

In an effort to promote an adamant anti-racist and anti-fascist message, Axis of Justice allied with Anti-Racist Action shortly after its formation.

Axis of Justice tents appeared at music festivals where either Audioslave or System of a Down were playing, as it did at Lollapalooza 2003. The Axis of Justice also puts out a monthly radio show that can be heard on Pacifica Radio station KPFK (90.7 FM) in Los Angeles, California, and on XM Satellite Radio. The shows are archived in MP3 format on the AOJ website and are available as free downloads. They also have a number of books on their website that they recommend to support their views.

In 2004, they released a live album/DVD entitled Axis of Justice: Concert Series Volume 1. It contains performances by Flea from Red Hot Chili Peppers, Brad Wilk from Rage Against the Machine, Chris Cornell of Soundgarden and Audioslave, Serj Tankian from System of a Down, Corey Taylor of Slipknot and Stone Sour, Pete Yorn, Tim Walker, Maynard James Keenan of Tool, A Perfect Circle and Puscifer, and Wayne Kramer among others. It was recorded during a concert at the Avalon in Los Angeles. The concert was a benefit to raise money for the Axis of Justice and a variety of causes.

On April 6, 2006, Morello was honored with the Eleanor Roosevelt Human Rights Award for his support of worker's rights and for his AOJ work. Morello has worked on numerous labor campaigns: the Guess sweatshop boycott, the LA janitors strike, the Taco Bell boycott, the southern California grocery workers strike & lockout, and the Democratic Socialists of America's Starbucks unionization campaign, among others.

Morello was a strong supporter of the 2006 United States immigration reform protests around the US. Morello played as the Nightwatchman at MacArthur Park in Los Angeles and has featured many articles on AOJ. On September 28, 2006, Morello was one of 400 protesters arrested protesting in support of immigrant hotel workers' rights, in what organizers called "the largest act of civil disobedience in the history of Los Angeles".

== Members ==
- Serj Tankian – lead vocals, piano
- Tom Morello – guitars, vocals

=== Performers ===
- Tim McIlrath – lead vocals
- Flea – bass
- Brad Wilk – drums
- Pete Yorn – guitars, vocals
- Tim Walker – guitars, pedal steel
- Maynard James Keenan – vocals
- Buckethead – multi-instrumentalist
- Slash – lead guitar
- Jonny Polonsky – keyboards, bass
- Chris Cornell – lead vocal
- Taylor Hawkins – drums
- Dave Grohl – drums, vocals, guitar
- Trent Reznor – lead vocals
- Krist Novoselic – bass
- Dave Catching – guitar
- Mike McCready – guitar
- Mike Mills – bass
- Billy Corgan – vocals, guitar
- James Iha – guitar
- Jeff Ament – bass
- Josh Freese – drums
- Duff Mckagan – bass, guitar, vocals
- Perry Farrell – vocals
- John Frusciante – guitar
- Jerry Cantrell – guitar
- Mike Inez – bass
- Daron Malakian – guitar
- Daniel Rey – guitar
- Chad Smith – drums
- Mike Watt – bass
- Pat Smear – guitar
- Jimmy Page – guitar
- John Paul Jones – bass
- Jeff Beck – guitar
- Josh Homme -rhythm guitar
- Stephen Perkins – drums
- Corey Taylor – lead vocals
- Simon Petty – guitars
- Zack De La Rocha – lead vocal
- Keith Levene – lead guitar
- Scott Weiland – lead vocals
- Malcolm Cross – drums, percussion, piano
- Travis Barker – drums
- Dez Cadena – guitar
- Matt Sorum – drums
- Gilby Clarke – guitar
- Sean Kinney – drums
- Stone Gossard – guitar
- Kim Gordon – vocals
- Lemmy Kilmister – vocals, bass
- Kim Thayil – guitar
- Alan White – drums
- Matt Cameron – drums
- Jimmy Chamberlin – drums
- Ben Shepherd – bass
- J Mascis – guitar
- John Fogerty – guitar, vocals
- Eddie Vedder – vocals
- Dave Kushner – guitar
- Art Karamian – guitar, vocals
- David Hakopyan – bass guitar
- Sammy J. Watson – drums
- Lenny Castro – percussion
- Kenny Aronoff – drums
- Iggy Pop – vocals
- Tim Commerford – bass
- Stu Cook – bass
- Martyn LeNoble – bass
- Alfredo Hernandez – percussion
- Nate Mendel – drums
- Alice Cooper – vocals
- Rick Parasher – keyboard, organ
- Mark Lanegan – vocals
- Maz Jobrani – comedian
- Sid Jordan – bass, piano
- Joe Mora – guitars
- Wayne Kramer – guitars, vocals
- John Dolmayan – drums
- Jurassic 5 – vocals
- Knowledge – spoken word
- Brian O'Connor – bass
- Ahmed Ahmed – comedian
- Boots Riley – vocals

== Discography ==
- Axis of Justice: Concert Series Volume 1 (2004)
