= Jazz-Iz-Christ =

Studio album by Jazz-iz Christ
- Released: July 23, 2013
- Recorded: 2012–2013
- Genre: Jazz
- Length: 56:32
- Label: Serjical Strike

Jazz-Iz-Christ is the only studio album by Jazz-iz Christ, a group fronted by Armenian–American singer Serj Tankian. The album was released on July 23, 2013, by Serjical Strike Records.

The album has essential participation of the renowned pianist Tigran Hamasyan, flautist Valeri Tolstov, and trumpet player Tom Duprey. It also features additional performances from Stewart Copeland and actor/musician David Alpay and Vincent Pedulla. Unlike much of Tankian's previous discography, only 4 of the 15 tracks features Serj's vocals ("Distant Thing", "Song of Sand", "Garuna", and "Miso Soup"). All the other tracks are instrumental, except for "End of Time", which features a female vocalist.

According to Tankian, Jazz-Iz-Christ is "a combination. There's some classic jazz, dance-y stuff, and progressive things. It's all over the place, but it's jazz instrument-wise. It's for a modern listener who appreciates jazz overtones."

== Track listing ==
No.	Title	Length
1.	"Fish Don't Scream" (featuring Tigran Hamasyan, Tom Duprey, Troy Zeigler & Valeri Tolstov)	3:37
2.	"End of Time" (featuring Tom Duprey, Troy Zeigler & Valeri Tolstov)	3:55
3.	"Honeycharmed" (featuring Troy Zeigler, Tom Duprey & Valeri Tolstov)	4:20
4.	"Arpeggio Bust" (featuring Troy Zeigler, Tom Duprey & Valeri Tolstov)	4:02
5.	"Yerevan to Paris" (featuring Tigran Hamasyan, Tom Duprey, Valeri Tolstov & Troy Zeigler)	4:01
6.	"Scotch in China" (featuring Troy Zeigler, Tom Duprey & Valeri Tolstov)	2:46
7.	"Distant Thing" (featuring Tigran Hamasyan, Tom Duprey, Valeri Tolstov, Vincent Pedulla, Robert Simring, Jeff Muzzerole, David Finch & Stewart Copeland)	3:43
8.	"Song of Sand" (featuring Tom Duprey, James Merenda, David Alpay & Vincent Pedulla)	3:04
9.	"Garuna" (featuring Tigran Hamasyan)	4:45
10.	"Balcony Chats" (featuring Valeri Tolstov)	4:07
11.	"Jinn" (featuring Troy Zeigler, Tom Duprey, Valeri Tolstov & Stepan Haytayan)	2:52
12.	"Waitomo Caves" (featuring Tigran Hamasyan, Tom Duprey & Valeri Tolstov)	2:56
13.	"Through Nights and Hopes" (featuring Tigran Hamasyan, Tom Duprey, Valeri Tolstov & Mario Caspar)	5:29
14.	"Papa Blue" (featuring Troy Zeigler, Tom Duprey, Valeri Tolstov & Jon Del Sesto)	3:24
15.	"Miso Soup" (featuring Mario Pagliarulo, Dan Monti, Troy Zeigler, Larry LaLonde, Tom Duprey & Valeri Tolstov)	3:31
Total length:		56:32

== Personnel ==
- Serj Tankian – vocals (on 7–9, 15), bass guitar (on 1–6, 10–12, 14), piano (on 2–3, 6, 14) electric guitar (on 11), acoustic guitar (on 15), sitar (on 3), synth (on 2–5, 12, 15), programming (on 1–6, 10–12, 14, 15), samples (on 1–6, 10–12, 14).
- Tigran Hamasyan – electric piano Rhodes (on 5, 12, 13), keyboards (on 1), piano (on 1, 5, 7, 9, 12, 13), bass synth (on 12, 13).
- Tom Duprey – flugelhorn (on 1, 4, 5, 7, 8, 15), trumpet (on 2–3, 6, 11–15), piccolo trumpet (on 11).
- Valeri Tolstov – flute (on 1–7, 10–15), guitar (on 10), piano (on 10), synth (on 13), programming (on 13), samples (on 13).
