= Imperfect Harmonies =

Studio album by Serj Tankian
- Released: September 21, 2010
- Genres: Symphonic rock; experimental rock; progressive rock; art rock
- Length: 44:09
- Labels: Reprise, Serjical Strike
- Producer: Serj Tankian

Serj Tankian chronology
Elect the Dead Symphony (2010)	Imperfect Harmonies (2010)	Imperfect Remixes (2011)

Serj Tankian studio album chronology
Elect the Dead (2007)	Imperfect Harmonies (2010)	Harakiri (2012)

Singles from Imperfect Harmonies
- 1. "Left of Center" Released: June 29, 2010; 2. "Reconstructive Demonstrations" Released: November 12, 2010

Imperfect Harmonies is the second studio album by Armenian-American singer Serj Tankian. The album was released on September 21, 2010, through Reprise Records and Serjical Strike Records.

== Release and promotion ==
Imperfect Harmonies was originally scheduled to be released on September 7, 2010, but was later pushed back two weeks to September 21. The paper manufacturing plant that Tankian selected to print the album's booklet ran out of tree-free paper and needed more time to obtain more of the material. Tankian is environmentally conscious and researched this type of paper on his own. Other releases by Tankian that use tree-free paper include his first solo effort Elect the Dead, and Hypnotize and Mezmerize, the last two releases by his band System of a Down.

The first song released off of Imperfect Harmonies was "Borders Are...". The song was released in June 2010 as a free download and also as an online lyric video. Serj Tankian had no involvement with the video. It was created by George Tonikian as a promotional tool while Tankian was on tour. This was followed by the album's first official single, "Left of Center". The song was released as a single in July 2010 and was later released as a music video in August 2010. These first two songs released from Imperfect Harmonies were described by Tankian as being "the most blatantly political songs on the record. Everything is a bit more philosophical and... more abstract.". Later he released "Disowned Inc." on his web page, and also created a game to discover pieces of the song.

The album opened at No. 35 on the Billboard 200 with 10,200 copies.

== Musical direction ==
In 2009, Tankian collaborated with New Zealand's Auckland Philharmonia Orchestra to perform a symphonic version of Elect the Dead. This pairing resulted in the live album Elect the Dead Symphony released in 2010. The experimentation of mixing orchestra music with rock music inspired Tankian to explore this blend further. In addition to orchestral music, Imperfect Harmonies takes influences from jazz and electronica.

== Touring ==
A world tour in support of the album began August 7 in Pori. Most shows featured the Flying Cunts of Chaos backed by eight classical players chosen from the city the performance took place in. The Lowlands Festival performance was a notable exception to this rule, where the band was backed by the Metropole Orchestra. As with previous tours, only material from Tankian's solo career was played. Beatus, Reconstructive Demonstrations and Wings of Summer were the only songs from the new album that were never performed.

On September 7 the Imperfect Harmonies tour was postponed until after the release of the album, although the tour never resumed.

== Reception ==
Professional ratings
Aggregate scores
Source	Rating
Metacritic	(67%)
Review scores
Source	Rating
AllMusic	4/5 stars
Alternative Press	4/5 stars
The A.V. Club	(B)
NME	7/10 stars
PopMatters	6/10 stars
Q	3/5 stars
Revolver	4/4 stars
Rock Sound	4/10 stars
Spin	4/10 stars
Sputnikmusic	4/5 stars

The album divided critics, some of which praised Tankian's new direction, while others criticised it for being too much of a departure. Overall, the album received generally favourable reviews, although first week sales figures were notably lower than Elect the Dead.

== Track listing ==
All lyrics are written by Serj Tankian; all music is composed by Serj Tankian.

UK release
No.	Title	Length
1.	"Disowned Inc."	4:07
2.	"Borders Are..."	4:38
3.	"Deserving?"	4:05
4.	"Beatus"	4:41
5.	"Reconstructive Demonstrations"	5:04
6.	"Electron"	3:46
7.	"Gate 21"	2:43
8.	"Yes, It's Genocide"	3:15
9.	"Peace Be Revenged"	3:59
10.	"Left of Center"	3:06
11.	"Wings of Summer" (featuring Shana Halligan from Bitter:Sweet)	4:45
Total length:		44:09

Japanese version and Promotional CD2 (Instrumentals)
No.	Title	Length
12.	"Goddamn Trigger"	3:20
Total length:		47:29

Amazon MP3 (Deluxe version)
No.	Title	Length
12.	"Deserving?" (orchestral)	4:07
13.	"Peace Be Revenged" (orchestral)	3:56
Total length:		52:12

iTunes (Deluxe version)
No.	Title	Length
12.	"Goddamn Trigger"	3:21
13.	"Deserving?" (orchestral)	4:08
14.	"Peace Be Revenged" (orchestral)	3:56
Total length:		55:34

Limited edition (Bonus disc)
No.	Title	Length
1.	"Disowned Inc." (orchestral)	4:11
2.	"Borders Are..." (orchestral)	4:40
3.	"Deserving?" (orchestral)	4:09
4.	"Beatus" (orchestral)	4:44
5.	"Reconstructive Demonstrations" (orchestral)	5:06
6.	"Peace Be Revenged" (orchestral)	3:56
Total length:		26:46

Best Buy (Bonus DVD)
No.	Title	Length
1.	"Empty Walls" (live)	6:19
2.	"Feed Us" (live)	4:37
3.	"Unthinking Majority" (live)	3:46
4.	"Lie Lie Lie" (live)	3:18
5.	"Sky Is Over" (live)	2:44
6.	"Beethoven's Cunt" (live)	8:49
Total length:		29:33

Promotional CD3 (Orchestral Mixes & Orchestral Instrumentals)
No.	Title	Length
1.	"Disowned Inc." (orchestral)	4:07
2.	"Borders Are" (orchestral)	4:38
3.	"Deserving?" (orchestral)	4:05
4.	"Beatus" (orchestral)	4:41
5.	"Reconstructive Demonstrations" (orchestral)	5:04
6.	"Peace Be Revenged" (orchestral)	3:59
7.	"Goddamn Trigger" (orchestral)	3:21
8.	"Disowned Inc." (orchestral and instrumental)	4:07
9.	"Borders Are" (orchestral and instrumental)	4:38
10.	"Deserving?" (orchestral and instrumental)	4:05
11.	"Beatus" (orchestral and instrumental)	4:41
12.	"Reconstructive Demonstrations" (orchestral and instrumental)	5:04
13.	"Wings of Summer" (orchestral and instrumental)	3:59
14.	"Goddamn Trigger" (orchestral and instrumental)	3:21
Total length:		59:50

== Personnel ==
All songs written, performed, produced, engineered and orchestrated by Serj Tankian.

- Vincent Pedulla – additional orchestrations
- Dan Monti – additional guitars on tracks 2, 6 & 11 and drum and bass engineering on tracks 1–6, 9 & 11
- Troy Zeigler – live drumming on tracks 1–6, 9 & 11
- Brain – live drumming on track 10
- Mario Pagliarulo – live bass on tracks 1–6, 9 & 11
- Shana Halligan – additional vocals on tracks 4 & 11
- Ani Maldjian – additional operatic vocals on various songs
- David Alpay – solo violin on track 11

== Charts ==
Chart performance for Imperfect Harmonies
Chart (2010)	Peak position
Australian Albums (ARIA)	56
Austrian Albums (Ö3 Austria)	13
Belgian Albums (Ultratop Flanders)	80
Belgian Albums (Ultratop Wallonia)	46
Canadian Albums (Billboard)	21
Czech Republic's Top 50	17
Dutch Albums (Album Top 100)	94
German Albums (Offizielle Top 100)	18
European Top 100 Albums	35
Finnish Albums (Suomen virallinen lista)	14
French Albums (SNEP)	29
Italian Albums (FIMI)	23
Japanese Album Charts (Oricon)	155
New Zealand Albums (RMNZ)	26
Polish Albums (ZPAV)	24
Russian Albums	23
Scottish Albums (Official Charts)	99
Spanish Albums (PROMUSICAE)	96
Swedish Albums (Sverigetopplistan)	44
Swiss Albums (Schweizer Hitparade)	12
UK Albums (OCC)	86
US Billboard 200	35
