= Flying Cunts of Chaos =

American rock band; former backing band of Serj Tankian

- Years active: 2007–present
- Members: Dan Monti (lead guitar, backing vocals); Larry LaLonde (rhythm guitar); Mario Pagliarulo (bass, backing vocals); Troy Zeigler (drums); Erwin Khachikian (piano)

Flying Cunts of Chaos (F.C.C) is a rock band on Serj Tankian's label that was also his backing band on his tours from 2007 to 2009.

== History ==
Serj Tankian was asked how the name "Flying Cunts of Chaos" was chosen and he stated; "Well, I was originally thinking of naming the record that, but I thought it might not make it into any retail stores. So when it was time to come up with a name for the band I thought 'Serj and the Flying Cunts of Chaos' just for fun, to be honest. We had two or three different names, I ran them by the guys in the band and, overwhelmingly, everyone liked the 'Cunts', so..." He also felt that the word "cunt" resonates better than "pussy", "whore"," or "bitch".

In 2007, Serj Tankian released his album "Elect the Dead" and went on tour with newly formed band F.C.C as his backup band.

The band members include: Dan Monti (lead guitar, backing vocals), the guitarist from Primus, Larry LaLonde, Mario Pagliarulo (bass, backing vocals), Troy Zeigler (drums) and Erwin Khachikian (piano).

In July 2010, they released their first single "Daysheet Blues" on iTunes.

In 2012, some members of the band went on to form the band The Hollywood Arson Project (Troy Zeigler, Mario Pagliarulo, Jeff Mallow).

In 2018, the band went on tour with Primus.
