= Serj Tankian =

Armenian-American singer (born 1967)

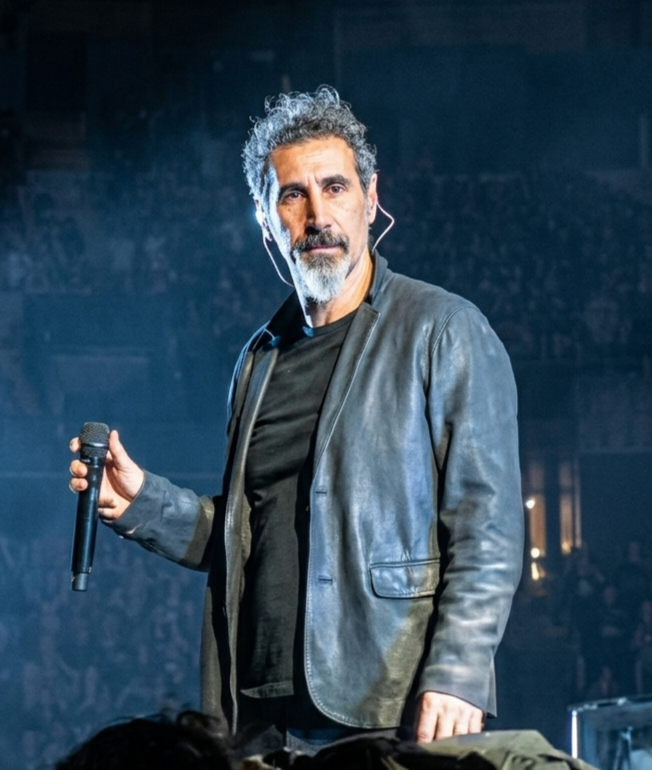
- Tankian in 2026

Background information
- Born: August 21, 1967 (age 59); Beirut, Lebanon
- Origin: Los Angeles, California, U.S.
- Genres: Alternative metal; nu metal; alternative rock; progressive rock; jazz; classical
- Occupations: Singer; musician; songwriter; record producer; political activist
- Instruments: Vocals; keyboards; piano; guitar
- Years active: 1992–present
- Labels: Serjical Strike; Reprise; American; Columbia; Axis of Justice; Woah Dad!
- Member of: System of a Down; Axis of Justice
- Formerly of: Serart
- Spouse: Angela Madatyan (m. 2012)
- Website: serjtankian.com

Serj Tankian (/sɜːrdʒ ˈtɑːnkiən/ TAHN-kee-ən, Western Armenian: Սերժ Թանգեան pronounced [sɛɾʒ tʰɑŋkʰˈjɑn]; born August 21, 1967) is an Armenian-American musician. He is best known as the lead vocalist and primary lyricist of the nu metal band System of a Down, which was formed in 1994.

Tankian has released five albums with System of a Down (System of a Down, Toxicity, Steal This Album!, Mezmerize, Hypnotize) and five solo albums (Elect the Dead, Imperfect Harmonies, Harakiri, Orca, and Elasticity), as well as collaborating with artists such as Tech N9ne, Buckethead, Mike Patton, Corey Taylor, Ronnie Radke, Deftones, David Draiman, Arto Tunçboyacıyan, Tony Iommi, Tom Morello, Devin Townsend, Limp Bizkit, Flea, Maynard James Keenan, and Benny Benassi. He also released Elect the Dead Symphony, a live orchestral version of Elect the Dead featuring the Auckland Philharmonia Orchestra. He is the founder of the record label Serjical Strike Records, and is currently represented by Velvet Hammer Music and Management Group.

Tankian is known and regarded as one of the best vocalists in heavy metal, with praise given to his unusual delivery and his wide vocal range. In 2006, he was ranked No. 26 on the Hit Parader list of "Top 100 Heavy Metal Vocalists". A study conducted by VVN Music found that Tankian possesses a high and diverse vocal range of 4.2 octaves.

In 2002, Tankian co-founded the non-profit political activism organization Axis of Justice, alongside guitarist and fellow activist Tom Morello. In 2011, he was awarded the Armenian Prime Minister's Medal for his contributions to the recognition of the Armenian genocide and the advancement of music.

== Early life ==
Serj Tankian was born in Beirut, Lebanon, on August 21, 1967, to Armenian parents Khachadour and Alice Tankian. He traces his ancestry to the cities of Chork Marzban, Mazaka, Evdokia, and Urha, all of which are in modern-day Turkey. His four grandparents were survivors of the Armenian genocide. Amid the Lebanese Civil War, at the age of 7, he moved to the U.S. with his parents, and the family settled in Los Angeles. In his youth, he attended the bilingual Rose and Alex Pilibos Armenian School, which was also attended by his future System of a Down bandmates Daron Malakian and Shavo Odadjian. Tankian was accepted into California State University, Northridge, graduating with a marketing degree in 1989. During his sophomore year, he first began to play instruments, particularly the keyboard, and write songs.

In an interview in 2021, Tankian stated;

"I was very lost. I was playing music at home, but I didn't have a band, I didn't have any connection, and my vision hadn't interpreted that this was my future yet. I was like, probably 22, 23 when I was really, when I discovered it... I was driving home, I had a Jeep Wrangler, I remember it was raining, very dramatic, and I really, I always say I have to go to the far reaches of who I don't wanna be to admit to myself who I really am. And I was in my car, and I literally stopped, and I just go, "I want to fuckin' do music. This is bullshit. I don't want to do all this shit." And that was the day that changed my life. From then on, anything I did was with the idea that I'm going on this path, and I gotta do whatever I gotta do to be on this path."

During his college years, Tankian began participating in political activism, attempting to draw attention to the recognition of the Armenian genocide during his time as president of the university's Armenian Students Association. He has said that his activism started with the Armenian Youth Federation (AYF) and the Shant Student Association of the Armenian Revolutionary Federation (ARF).

== Career ==
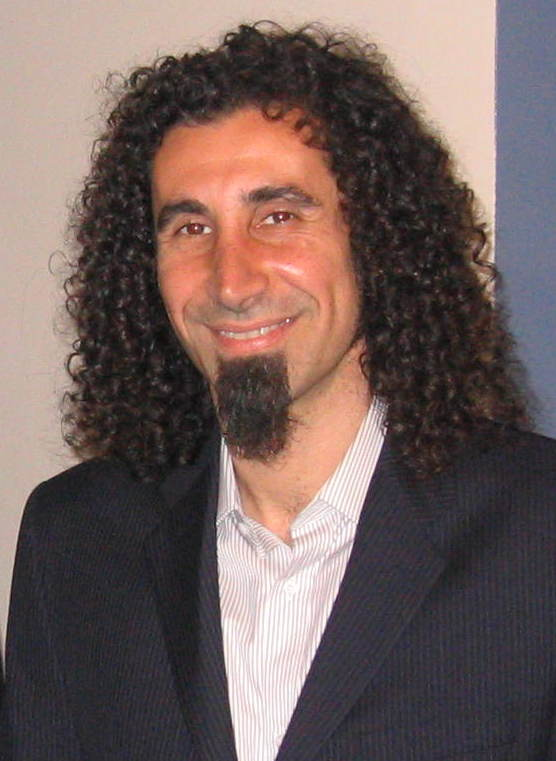
Tankian in 2006

=== System of a Down (1994–present) ===
The beginnings of System of a Down lie in a band named Soil (not to be confused with the Chicago-based band SOiL) with Tankian on vocals and keyboards, Malakian on vocals & lead guitar, Dave Hakopyan on bass, and Domingo Laranio on drums. The band initially hired Odadjian as their manager before he was to transition into their rhythm guitarist. Laranio and Hakopyan later left the band feeling that it was not going anywhere, leading to Soil splitting up.

After the split, Tankian, Odadjian and Malakian formed System of a Down, named after a poem Malakian wrote called Victims of a Down (which was later featured on the back-side of the band-to-be's self-titled debut). The band recruited drummer Ontronik "Andy" Khachaturian, an old school friend of Malakian, and Odadjian who had played with Malakian in a band called Snowblind during their teens. In mid-1997, Khachaturian left the band because of a hand injury (he subsequently co-founded The Apex Theory, which included former Soil bassist Dave Hakopyan). Khachaturian was replaced by John Dolmayan. Dolmayan is also the drummer for the band Indicator and former drummer for Scars on Broadway.

The band began touring the Southern California rock clubs, building a strong following.

The band achieved commercial success with the release of five studio albums, three of which debuted at number one on the Billboard 200. System of a Down has been nominated for four Grammy Awards, and their song "B.Y.O.B." won the Best Hard Rock Performance of 2006. In May the same year, the band announced they were going on hiatus.

On November 29, 2010, following several weeks of internet rumors, System of a Down officially announced that they would play shows in Europe during Festivals and in North America, mostly in the U.S., embarking on a tour for the following three years.

The band was in limbo of not releasing any new tracks until November 2020, when they released "Protect the Land" and "Genocidal Humanoidz", which were songs that were made to help the cause of the Second Nagorno-Karabakh War. The song's profits went to the Armenia Fund.

In the following years, System of a Down increasingly limited their live appearances. On May 14, 2023, the band hosted their only live performance of the year as co-headliners of the Sick New World festival in Las Vegas. In 2024, the band performed two gigs, making headline appearances at Sick New World on April 27, and at a standalone concert (together with Deftones) at the Golden Gate Park in San Francisco, the first-ever ticketed live event to take place at the venue.

=== Elect the Dead, side projects, and guest appearances (2007–2009) ===
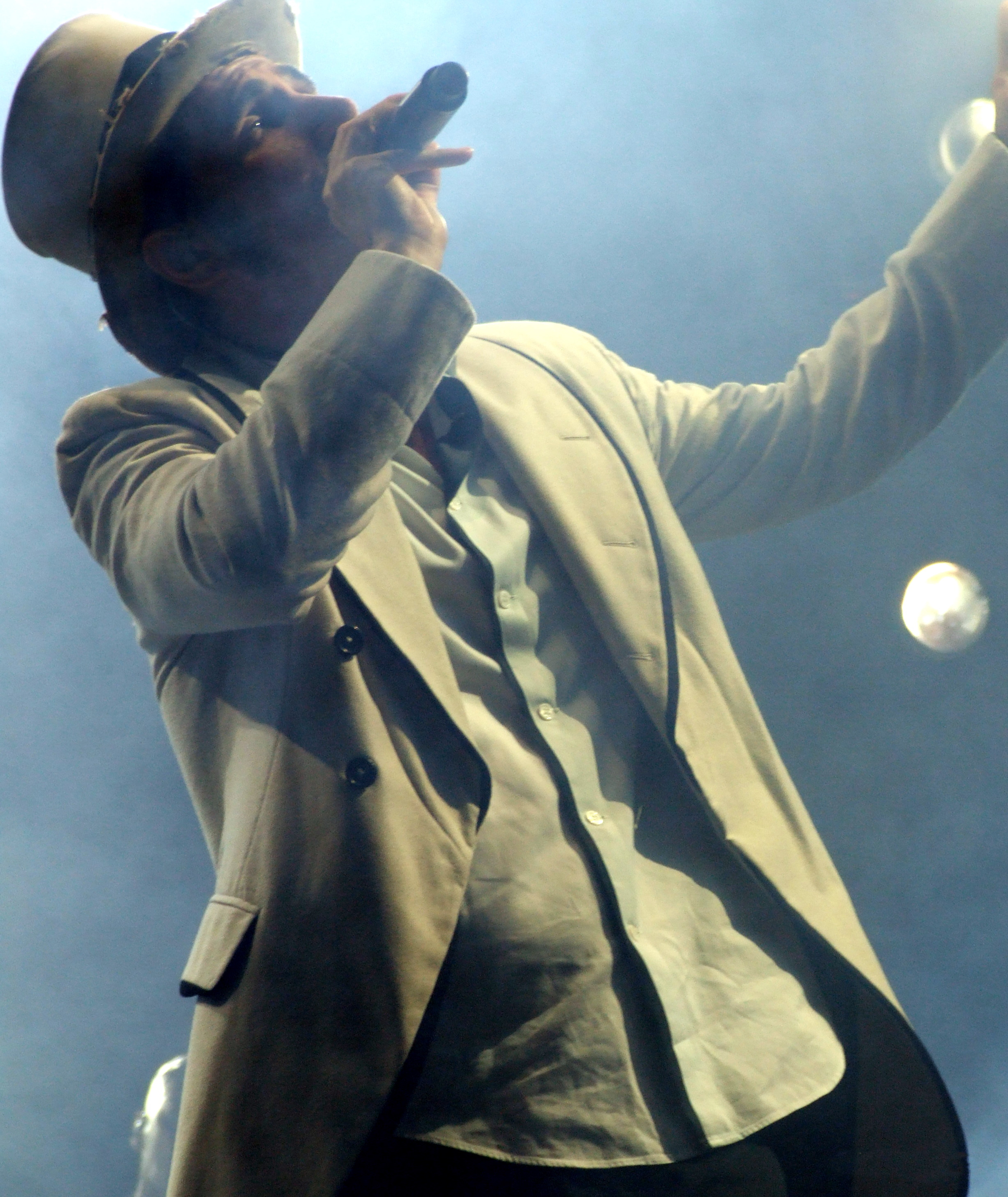
Tankian touring with his backing band, Flying Cunts of Chaos, in 2008

Tankian's breakthrough as a solo artist came with the release of his debut record Elect the Dead. The first singles from Elect the Dead are "The Unthinking Majority" and "Empty Walls". The music video "Feed Us" was released on the Swedish and UK MTV. A music video was directed and filmed for every song on the record, each by unique directors. Tankian explained, "I asked each of the directors for their visual interpretation of my work. They were asked not to write treatments and that they could make whatever they liked. The results have been overwhelmingly amazing!"

Three different promo versions of the album have surfaced to the public. The instrumental promotional version, issued by Serjical Strike/Reprise Records and intended for the music and movie industry, contains instrumental versions of the twelve album tracks. Another promotional version, issued by Reprise Records and made only for individual reviewers, features the album in final master form. This promotional CD-R, which was labeled "Smart Talk" as a codename for "Serj Tankian" to prevent leaking by unauthorized persons, also indicates that the album was finalized prior to August 20, 2007.

The official tour for Elect the Dead commenced on October 12, 2007, with a show at Chicago's Vic Theatre. Roughly one thousand people attended the first concert. Although Tankian had stated he would not be performing any material by System of a Down, he performed "Charades" and "Blue", songs co-written by Daron Malakian, the guitarist of the band. "Blue" had previously appeared on their Fourth Demo Tape in 1998, and Charades was attempted during the 2005 Mezmerize/Hypnotize sessions, but never released (although a short video clip of Tankian and Dolmayan playing the song in a recording studio was featured on "the Making of Mezmerize/Hypnotize"). Although it is originally a song restricted to piano and vocals, Tankian used his backing band, the Flying Cunts of Chaos (F.C.C.).

Tankian is also politically involved. Together with Tom Morello, he founded the organization Axis of Justice and often speaks publicly against violence and injustice in the world. Tankian released a new song "Fears" in November 2008 exclusively in support of Amnesty International's Global Write-A-Thon.

In 2009, Tankian collaborated with the band Viza (previously known as Visa) for their track "Viktor".

=== Imperfect Harmonies (2010) ===
Tankian's second solo album was originally due in 2009. It is said to be more of a jazz and orchestral based sound. Tankian said of the second album:

I'm structuring the next record kind of like a jazz orchestral. I've got a full orchestra interested, so I want this giant electric guitar in the air to be played by a full orchestra. I want the orchestra to be the electric guitar. I want to make an orchestra do what it's never done before, like a GG Allin type orchestra. Think of that.

The album had the working title Music Without Borders, however, the final album title is Imperfect Harmonies. On June 23, 2010, a promo single from his upcoming album Imperfect Harmonies was released called "Borders Are". The first radio single from Imperfect Harmonies, "Left of Center", was released on July 13, 2010. A third single, "Disowned Inc." was released on August 9, 2010. Imperfect Harmonies was released on September 21, 2010. Preceding the album's release, two contests were announced (one consisting of brainteasers related to the album/song titles, the other an art contest) in which fans could win prizes such as Tankian's autograph and merchandise. On August 22, 2010, a music video for "Left of Center" was released on Tankian's MySpace account.

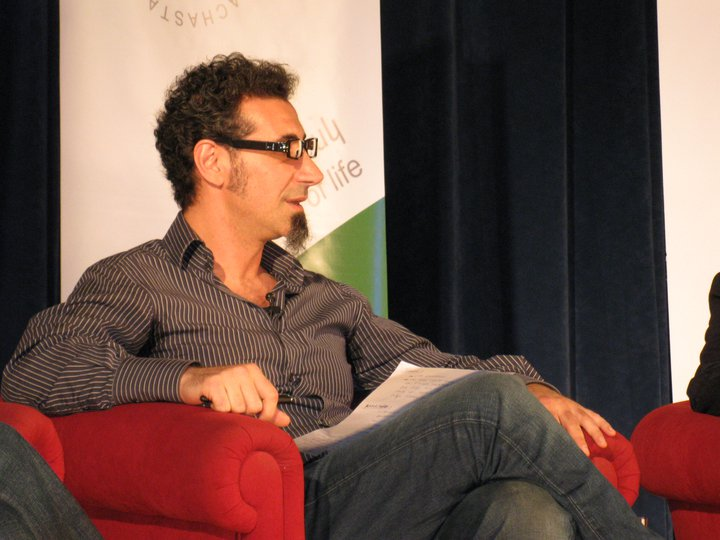
Tankian in Armenia, 2011

The premiere date for Tankian and Sater's Prometheus Bound at the American Repertory Theater was February 25, 2011. Tankian said that collaborating on the show has been a great learning experience for him. "I've been using a lot of my archives, a lot of different types of music that I had already put together for underscoring and what not," he said. "It's quite diverse, from noise to jazz to electronic stuff to hip-hop songs to rock songs to cool, piano dark underscores, and that's a whole different bag of tricks there because it's always evolving. Unlike a film score that's very linear and you get a scene to score for, this is something where you do another workshop and one song is gone, that underscore changes to 20 seconds and they need something else on the spot. Everything's always changing until the show comes, so it's quite interesting."

In January 2011, Tankian released a music video for his song "Reconstructive Demonstrations" from his album Imperfect Harmonies. Tankian also announced on his Facebook page, during the video's release, that an EP titled Imperfect Remixes would be released sometime within 2011. On March 1, Tankian released Imperfect Remixes and the music video for "Goodbye", a remix of "Gate 21" from Imperfect Harmonies.

Tankian co-wrote a musical with the American playwright Steven Sater. It is based on the Ancient Greek tragedy Prometheus Bound. It opened at the American Repertory Theater on March 14, 2011.

=== Harakiri (2012), Orca (2013), and Jazz-iz-Christ (2013) ===
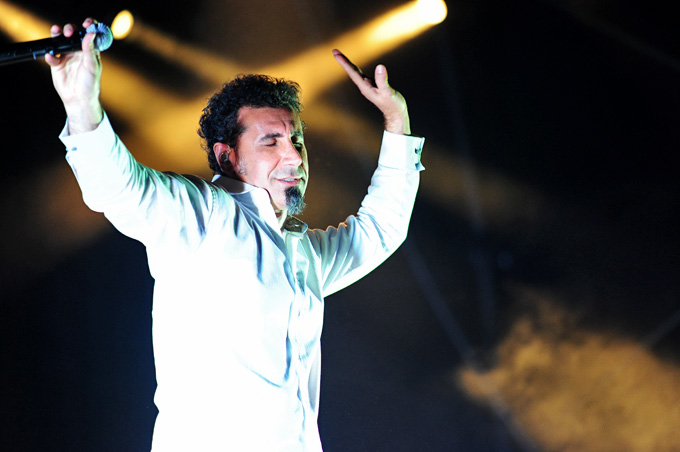
Tankian performing with System of a Down at the 2012 Soundwave Festival in Perth, Australia

In early July 2011, Tankian posted a video on YouTube showing two samples of new songs. During the video he said "next year". In multiple interviews he has stated that he has been working on a rock record that will be released in 2011, and some side projects including jazz, electronic, and symphonic records. It was later confirmed that his third album would be called Harakiri and will be released on July 10, 2012. In 2012, he planned for this to be the first of four new albums. The first single from Harakiri, "Figure It Out", was released on May 1. A music video for the song appeared on Tankian's official YouTube page. A second single from the album, "Cornucopia", was released on June 10. A third single, title track "Harakiri", was made available as a preorder bonus from Tankian's website on June 20.

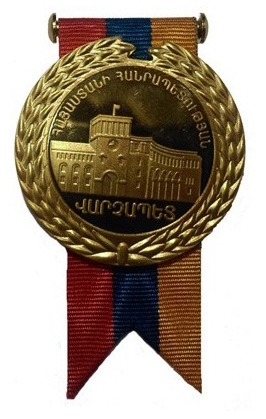
Commemorative Medal of the Prime Minister of Armenia

On August 12, 2011, Tankian traveled to Armenia, where he was received at Government House by then-Prime Minister Tigran Sargsyan, who awarded him with a Commemorative Medal (Armenian: ՀՀ Վարչապետի հուշամեդալ) for his "contribution to the recognition of the Armenian Genocide and the advancement of music". Tankian promised to return and put on a concert to commemorate the 100th anniversary of the Armenian Genocide, which he did on April 24, 2015, playing for free for over two hours in Yerevan's Republic Square.

He released his fourth studio album Orca Symphony No. 1 on June 25, 2013. The album takes the form of a classical symphony. A professionally sampled studio version was released on November 30, 2012, while the live recorded version was released on June 25, 2013, through Serjical Strike Records.

His fifth studio album Jazz-Iz-Christ was released on July 23, 2013, by Serjical Strike Records. The release features Tankian's vocals on only four of the 15 tracks; all others are instrumental, except for "End of Time", which features a female vocalist. In 2014, he collaborated with Italian DJ Benny Benassi for the single "Shooting Helicopters".

On April 9, 2013, Tankian collaborated with Device, a project led by Disturbed frontman David Draiman. He had a guest appearance on the song "Out of Line" on Device's self-titled album. Tankian also appeared on the Tech N9ne album Something Else in 2013 on the song "Straight Out the Gate".

=== Film and television scores (2017–2022) ===
He was a surprise guest performer for the Game of Thrones Live Concert Experience in Los Angeles on March 25, 2017, singing "The Rains of Castamere". His rendition of the song also made it onto the soundtrack for the eighth season of Game of Thrones in 2019.

In June and July 2017, he was a guest on multiple shows of the Prophets of Rage during System of a Down's European tour, singing "Like a Stone" in memory of his friend, Audioslave's Chris Cornell.

In November 2017, Swedish independent label Woah Dad! acquired the albums that Tankian recorded for Reprise Records.

Tankian composed music for I Am Not Alone, a 2019 documentary film about the 2018 Armenian revolution. He was also an executive producer of the film.

Tankian composed the music for the second season of the Netflix series Down to Earth with Zac Efron.

==== Fuktronic (2020) ====
Fuktronic, an electronic music collaboration with Mindless Self Indulgence's Jimmy Urine was released in May 2020, after the duo released a sample on SoundCloud. Fuktronic is described as "the team of Serj Tankian and Jimmy Urine from Mindless Self Indulgence, making a soundtrack for the ultimate British Gangster Film. It's an electronic album with 12 tracks (4 instrumental and 8 tracks that have original scripted dialogue that portrays the trials and tribulations of a fresh out of prison British gangster who hasn't learned his lesson)."

==== Elasticity (2021) ====
Tankian released his first ever EP titled Elasticity on March 19, 2021. He announced the release of his EP, and released the title track "Elasticity", along with a music video for it, on February 5, 2021. In his announcement, Tankian stated "When I conceived possibly doing another record with the guys from System of a Down a few years back, I started working on a set of songs that I arranged in rock format for that purpose, As we weren't able to see eye to eye on the vision going forward with a SOAD album, I decided to release these songs under my moniker." The EP features songs like "Electric Yerevan", which is described as a "rallying cry" for Armenia, "Rumi", a poetic song about Tankian's son, and "Your Mom", which has been described as a "political mash-up".

==== Perplex Cities (2022) ====
Tankian released his second EP titled Perplex Cities on October 21, 2022.

=== Down With The System and new solo projects (2023–present) ===
In October 2023, Tankian announced that he would release his first memoir, Down With the System, on May 14, 2024, via Hachette Books; the artist wrote on X, "I had a blast working on this accidentally hatched philosophical memoir, as it's given me the unique opportunity to deep dive into my family history, my own motivations from a young age and lessons I didn't know I had learned".

In April 2024, during an interview with Metal Hammer in promotion of Down With the System, Tankian announced that he would release a new solo EP, titled Foundations, in September of the same year; he also revealed that he had originally written one of the songs included in the project for System of a Down, while two other tracks had been recorded during the studio sessions for his 2007 solo album Elect the Dead. The first single from the EP, "A.F. Day", was released on May 17 of the same year.

In September 2026, Tankian appeared on the Falling in Reverse song "Joseph" along with Corey Taylor of Slipknot.

== Influences ==
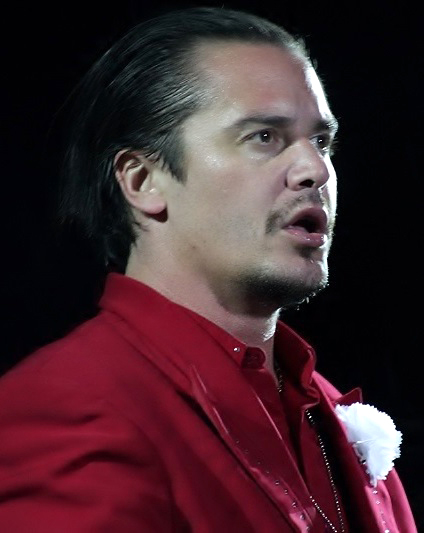
Mike Patton (pictured) was a major influence on Tankian.

Tankian grew up listening to traditional Armenian music in his exiled community in Lebanon and sang it with his father Khatchadour Tankian. He discovered pop music only once his family moved to Los Angeles in the 1970s via the Bee Gees' soundtrack to Saturday Night Fever, that led him to delve into it. In his 20s, he bought every record by the Beatles, whom he has called the most "universal" artists he is aware of. Tankian said that the first hard rock album that left an impact on him was 1992's Angel Dust by Faith No More. When System of a Down toured with Faith No More singer Mike Patton, who at the time fronted his other band Mr. Bungle on the 2000 SnoCore Tour, Tankian said that both vocalists "had some of the most interesting conversations" of his life. Besides the experimental vocals of Patton, Tankian is greatly influenced by Frank Zappa, especially by his albums Sheik Yerbouti and Joe's Garage.

Tankian holds in high regard the soundtrack of The Good, the Bad and the Ugly by Ennio Morricone, and the albums Decoy by Miles Davis and …And Justice for All by Metallica. He also much admires the reinvention that the British band Radiohead went through in their 2000 record Kid A, saying that it serves as an example to other artists.

In his lyrics, he explores themes such as anti-fascism, politics, ancient history, war, religion, good and evil.

== Views and activism ==
Tankian is passionate about human rights, recognition of genocides, and social justice. These traits have helped to shape his lyrical style. He has organized and participated in many protests, from Armenian genocide recognition to Axis of Justice (AOJ) protests held by him and AOJ co-founder Tom Morello. He also covers current issues in his music. In his music, issues like the war on terror, overpopulation, genocide, environmentalism, and the American prison system are addressed. He and his System of a Down bandmates were featured in the 2006 documentary film Screamers, which covers the United States' position on genocide. In the film, Tankian interviews his grandfather, Stepan Haytayan, a survivor of the Armenian genocide, who recounts his experience of it.

Tankian serves on the advisory board for TUMO Center for Creative Technologies.

=== Views on religion ===
Tankian said in an interview that he has "the same religion as that tree over there". He said, "It's a mix of Native American, Christian, Buddhist, and Transcendental ideas. I like to think of Earth as mother. I like to think of sky as grandfather. God has been used for ulterior motives". In another interview, he said, "I believe very firmly that indigenous populations had a really good, intuitive understanding of why we're here. And we're trying to gain that same understanding through psychology and intellect in modern civilization".

=== Political views ===
Following the September 11 attacks, Tankian wrote an essay in which he stated, "If we carry out bombings on Afghanistan or elsewhere to appease public demand, and very likely kill innocent civilians along the way, we'd be creating many more martyrs going to their deaths in retaliation against the retaliation. As shown from yesterday's events, you cannot stop a person who's ready to die".

In the 2008 Democratic Party primaries, Tankian originally supported Dennis Kucinich, but subsequently stated that Barack Obama "presents the best possible scenario for a hopeful future, but I don't personally put my trust in any political office". In the 2016 Democratic Party primaries, he endorsed Bernie Sanders and wrote on Facebook, "When it comes to standing up to the oligarchs, leading the fight for civil rights, income-equality, and so much more, no other politician has been so consistent and incorruptible as Bernie Sanders". He further praised Sanders, "He's said what he's done and he'd done what he says in the Senate. All his contributions are from private individuals; everyone else's are from major donors and corporations. It does not take a genius to see who's working for whom here".

Concerning the Syrian Civil War, Tankian in 2022 advocated negotiating with Bashar al-Assad, letting Iran deal with ISIS, whom he accused Saudi Arabia, Qatar, and Turkey of supporting.

Tankian supported Bernie Sanders's bid during the 2020 US Democratic Party primaries and said that although it was "frustrating" for his brother-in-law John Dolmayan to support Donald Trump, they are "on the same page with Armenian issues".

Tankian is also friendly with current Armenian Prime Minister Nikol Pashinyan, who wrote a song called "Hayastane" (Հայաստանը, 'Armenia') which Tankian performed in April 2020. Tankian was also an executive producer and composer for the documentary I Am Not Alone, which chronicled the rise of Pashinyan.

Tankian is a supporter of the Black Lives Matter protests, as he stated in his interview with H-Pem.

In 2020, Tankian condemned the actions of Azerbaijan in the Second Nagorno-Karabakh War and expressed his support to Armenia and the Republic of Artsakh. Since September 27, 2020, when the war broke, Tankian has been very active on social media, posting daily messages and has spoken to a number of media outlets about the issue, including Forbes.

In May 2021, more than 600 musicians, including Tankian, added their signature to an open letter calling for a boycott of performances in Israel until Israel ends its occupation of the Palestinian territories. In November 2023, Tankian signed an open letter calling for a ceasefire in the Gaza war.

On October 3, 2026, Tankian appeared at the Power to the People Festival at Merriweather Post Pavilion in Columbia, MD. The festival, which was put on by Tom Morello, also featured performances by Morello, Bruce Springsteen, Foo Fighters and many others. The festival is being held in response to President Donald Trump.

=== Animal rights and environmental issues ===
Tankian is an advocate of environmental and animal protection. He became a vegetarian, claiming in an interview with PETA that his change was due to "touring and its variety of edible crap", and he also felt it was "instinctive somewhat". Furthermore, he also feels the need for respect toward "mother earth". In July 2009, he signed a PETA petition against the slaughtering methods of chickens in KFC slaughterhouses.

However, in 2024 Tankian stated in an interview on the popular YouTube channel Mythical Kitchen that he had begun eating meat again the year prior.

== Personal life ==
On June 9, 2012, Tankian married his long-time girlfriend Angela Madatyan, an Armenian woman from Vanadzor, in a private ceremony in Simi Valley, California. On October 24, 2014, he announced that they had a son. The family lives intermittently between Warkworth, New Zealand and Los Angeles as of 2015. Tankian is the brother-in-law of his System of a Down bandmate John Dolmayan, as their respective wives are sisters.

In 2018, Tankian founded Kavat Coffee, a company that focuses on Armenian coffee.

== Discography ==
=== Solo ===
- Elect the Dead (2007)
- Imperfect Harmonies (2010)
- Harakiri (2012)
- Orca Symphony No. 1 (2013)
- Cinématique Series: Illuminate (2021)
- Cinématique Series: Violent Violins (2021)
- Elasticity (2021)
- Perplex Cities (2022)
- Live at Leeds (2022)
- Invocations (2023)
- Foundations (2024)
- Covers, Collaborations & Collages (2025)

=== With System of a Down ===
- System of a Down (1998)
- Toxicity (2001)
- Steal This Album! (2002)
- Mezmerize (2005)
- Hypnotize (2005)

=== With Jazz-Iz-Christ ===
- Jazz-Iz-Christ (2013)

=== Collaboration albums ===
- Serart (2003) (with Arto Tunçboyacıyan)
- Enter the Chicken (2005) (with Buckethead)
- Fuktronic (2020) (with Jimmy Urine)
- Black Thunder (2023) (with The HU)
- The Singularity (2024) (with Bear McCreary)

=== Video games ===
- Total Paranoia - Batman: Arkham City (2011)
- No Tomorrow - Metal: Hellsinger (with Two Feathers) (2022)

== Bibliography ==
- Cool Gardens, 2001, MTV Books
- Glaring Through Oblivion, 2011, It Books
- Down With The System: A Memoir (of Sorts), 2024, Hachette Books

== Filmography ==
- Screamers (2006)
- My Little Prince (2012)
- The Last Inhabitant (2016)
- 1915 (2016)
- Furious (Легенда о Коловрате) (2017)
- Spitak (Спитак) (2018)
- Truth to Power (2021)
- Crime Scene, The Texas Killing Fields (2022)
- Madoff: The Monster of Wall Street (2023)
- The Fall of El Mayo (2026)

== Awards and nominations ==
System of a Down has been nominated for four Grammy Awards, of which they won one in 2006 for "Best Hard Rock Performance" for their song "B.Y.O.B.".

=== Grammy Awards ===
Year	Nominee / work	Award	Result
2002	"Chop Suey!"	Best Metal Performance	Nominated
2003	"Aerials"	Best Hard Rock Performance	Nominated
2006	"B.Y.O.B."	Best Hard Rock Performance	Won
2007	"Lonely Day"	Best Hard Rock Performance	Nominated

=== General ===
- In 2005, System of a Down won an MTV Europe Music Award for Best Alternative.
- In 2006, System of a Down won an MTV Good Woodie Award for their song "Question!".
