= List of post-punk revival bands =

Post-punk revival is a type of indie rock that emulates the sound of post-punk bands of the late 1970s and new wave bands of the early 1980s and has been stylistically tied to 1990s music movements such as shoegaze, Britpop, garage revival and post-hardcore. They feature a more artsy, complex sound than other branches of indie rock, and often add synthesizer or other electronic sounds to the traditional guitar, bass and drums lineup.

Post-punk revivalism started in England in the early 2000s and, while it is still strongest there, has grown in popularity in the US, Australia and Canada. Post-punk revivalism is prevalent in the London and New York City music scenes.

== !/# ==
- !!!
- ¡Forward, Russia!
- 1990s

Back to top

== A ==
- Action Action
- The Airborne Toxic Event
- Algiers
- Ambulance LTD
- Apollo Heights
- L'Arc-en-Ciel
- Arcade Fire
- Arctic Monkeys
- Art Brut
- Astral
- Audra
- Autoramas
- The Automatic

Back to top

== B ==
- Babyshambles
- Band of Skulls
- Battle
- Baumer
- Be Your Own Pet
- Beach Fossils
- Beastmilk
- Bell Hollow
- The Birthday Massacre
- Big John Bates
- The Black Angels
- Black Country, New Road
- Black Ice
- The Black Keys
- Black Kids
- Black Lips
- Black Marble
- Black Midi
- Black Rebel Motorcycle Club
- Black Tie Dynasty
- Black Wire
- Blacklist
- Bloc Party
- The Blood Arm
- Blood Red Shoes
- Bombay Bicycle Club
- Born Ruffians
- The Boxer Rebellion
- Boy Harsher
- Boy Kill Boy
- The Bravery
- British Sea Power
- Broken Social Scene
- Buerak
- Bunny Lake
- Le Butcherettes

Back to top

== C ==
- Cachorro Grande
- Catfish and the Bottlemen
- Cazals
- Los Campesinos!
- Cansei de Ser Sexy
- Ceremony
- Chai
- The Chalets
- Chapel Club
- The Chavs
- The Chinese Stars
- Chromatics
- Chvrches
- The Cinematics
- Cities In Dust
- Clap Your Hands Say Yeah
- Clearlake
- Clinic
- Clor
- The Cloud Room
- Cold Cave
- Cold War Kids
- Colder
- Communique
- The Courteeners
- The Cribs
- Crocodiles
- Cut Copy
- Cut Off Your Hands

Back to top

== D ==
- Dandy Warhols
- The Datsuns
- The Dead 60s
- Dead Disco
- Death Cab For Cutie
- Death From Above 1979
- Deerhunter
- The Departure
- Desperate Journalist
- Detachment Kit
- Dirty Projectors
- Dirty Pretty Things
- Dismemberment Plan
- Division of Laura Lee
- DK Energetyk
- Do Nothing (band)
- Does It Offend You, Yeah?
- Dogs
- Dogs Die in Hot Cars
- Doves
- Dragons
- The Dreaming
- Drowners
- The Drums
- Duchess Says
- Los Dynamite

Back to top

== E ==
- Eagulls
- Editors
- The Eighties Matchbox B-Line Disaster
- Electrelane
- Electric Six
- Eliot Sumner
- Elefant
- Empire of the Sun
- Enon
- Entertainment
- Erase Errata
- Every Move a Picture
- Everything Everything

Back to top

== F ==
- The Faint
- The Fashion
- Film School
- Fine China
- Fight Like Apes
- Foals
- Fontaines D.C.
- Franz Ferdinand
- The Fratellis
- Frausdots
- French Films
- French Kicks
- Friendly Fires
- Frightened Rabbit
- Frog Eyes
- Future Islands
- The Futureheads

Back to top

== G ==
- Les Georges Leningrad
- Get Shakes
- GHUM
- Girls Names
- Githead
- Glasvegas
- GoGoGo Airheart
- Good Shoes
- Goribor
- The Gossip
- The Grates
- Grizzly Bear

Back to top

== H ==
- Handsome Furs
- Hard-Fi
- Hatcham Social
- Have a Nice Life
- The Hives
- The Hold Steady
- The Horrors
- Hot Hot Heat
- Humanzi
- Hypernova

Back to top

== I ==
- I Love You But I've Chosen Darkness
- Iceage
- Idles
- Ikara Colt
- Infadels
- The Intelligence
- The (International) Noise Conspiracy
- Interpol

Back to top

== J ==
- The Jane Bradfords
- Japanese Cartoon
- Japanther
- Jarboli
- Jemina Pearl
- Jihad Jerry & The Evildoers
- The Joy Formidable
- Joywave
- Jupiter One

Back to top

== K ==
- Kaiser Chiefs
- Kasabian
- The Killers
- Kill Hannah
- The Kills
- Kings of Leon
- Kittens for Christian
- Klaxons
- The Kooks

Back to top

== L ==
- Ladytron
- Lansing-Dreiden
- The Last Shadow Puppets
- Late of the Pier
- LCD Soundsystem
- Le Tigre
- Les Savy Fav
- Liars
- The Libertines
- Lifelover
- The Little Flames
- Little Man Tate
- Local Natives
- The Long Blondes
- The Longcut
- Longwave
- The Lost Patrol
- Los Hermanos
- Louis XIV
- Love Is All
- Love of Diagrams
- Low Art Thrill

Back to top

== M ==
- The Maccabees
- Made in Japan
- Mahogany
- Mando Diao
- Mallu Magalhães
- Mannequin Depressives
- The Mary Onettes
- Masquerade
- Maxïmo Park
- Melody Club
- Men, Women & Children
- Metric
- MGMT
- Milburn
- Minus the Bear
- Modest Mouse
- Molchat Doma
- Monsters Are Waiting
- Moptop
- Morningwood
- Moving Units
- Murder By Death
- The Music
- Mute Math
- Mystery Jets

Back to top

== N ==
- The Naked and Famous
- The National
- Neils Children
- Neptune
- New Pornographers
- The Nervous Return
- Nežni Dalibor
- Nightmare of You
- Noisettes
- Numbers

Back to top

== O ==
- Obojeni Program
- OK Go
- The Open
- The Organ
- Ornatos Violeta
- The Oxfam Glamour Models

Back to top

== P ==
- Parquet Courts
- Passion Pit
- The Parlotones
- Pete and the Pirates
- Phantom Planet
- Phase
- Phoenix
- The Photo Atlas
- Pigeon Detectives
- Pilot to Gunner
- Pin Me Down
- Pink Grease
- The Pink Spiders
- P.K. 14
- A Place to Bury Strangers
- Placebo
- Ploho
- Polysics
- The Postal Service
- Preoccupations
- Pretty Girls Make Graves
- The Prids
- Priests
- Protomartyr
- The Paddingtons
- The Pipettes

Back to top

== Q ==
- Q and Not U

Back to top

== R ==
- Ra Ra Riot
- Radio 4
- The Rakes
- The Rapture
- The Rascals
- The Raveonettes
- Repetitor
- Reverend and the Makers
- The Revolutionary Hydra
- The Rifles
- Rival Schools
- The Robocop Kraus
- Robots In Disguise
- Rock Kills Kid

Back to top

== S ==
- SadSvit
- Satisfact
- Savages
- Les Savy Fav
- Scanners
- Scatter The Ashes
- Selfish Cunt
- Serena Maneesh
- Shame
- She Past Away
- She Wants Revenge
- The Sheila Divine
- The Shins
- Shiny Toy Guns
- SHITDISCO
- Silversun Pickups
- Six Finger Satellite
- Sledgeback
- Sluts of Trust
- Snow Patrol
- Snowden
- Soledad Brothers
- Soulwax
- The Sounds
- A Spectre Is Haunting Europe
- Spoon
- Squid
- Starflyer 59
- The Static Jacks
- Stellastarr*
- Stereophonics
- The Stills
- The Strokes
- The Strypes
- Stylex
- Surfer Blood
- Supernaut
- Switches

Back to top

== T ==
- The Temper Trap
- Tereu Tereu
- Terry Poison
- Thee Oh Sees
- These New Puritans
- Those Manic Seas
- The Thermals
- The Thrills
- Thriving Ivory
- Thunderbirds are Now!
- Tigers Jaw
- Titus Andronicus
- Tokyo Police Club
- The Tossers
- Trembling Blue Stars
- TV on the Radio
- The Twilight Sad
- Twisted Wheel
- Two Door Cinema Club

Back to top

== U ==
- Ugly Casanova
- Uh Huh Her
- The Unicorns

Back to top

== V ==
- The Vaccines
- Vampire Weekend
- Van She
- Tom Vek
- The Veils
- The Velvet Teen
- Vernian Process
- VHS or Beta
- Viagra Boys
- The Vines
- The Violets
- The Virgins
- Vola and the Oriental Machine
- The Von Bondies
- Vue

Back to top

== W ==
- The Walkmen
- Walter Meego
- The Warlocks
- Warmduscher
- Wavves
- We Are the Physics
- We Are Scientists
- We Have Band
- We Were Promised Jetpacks
- Weep
- Wet Leg
- The Whip
- White Lies
- White Rabbits
- White Rose Movement
- The White Stripes
- Wild Beasts
- Wilderness
- Witch Hats
- Wolf Parade
- The Wombats
- Women

Back to top

== X ==
- Xiu Xiu
- The xx
- XX Teens

Back to top

== Y ==
- Yard Act
- Yeah Yeah Yeahs
- Young Knives
- The Young Werewolves

Back to top

== Z ==
- The Zutons

Back to top
