= Grace (surname) =

Grace is an English, Scottish or Irish surname. Notable people with the surname include:

- Alfred Augustus Grace (1867–1942), New Zealand soldier and writer
- Arthur Grace (born 1947), American photojournalist and author
- Billy Grace (1876–1938), Australian rules footballer
- Bradley Grace (born 1982), Irish musician
- Brendan Grace (1951–2019), Irish comedian and singer
- Briar Grace-Smith, New Zealand screenwriter, director, actor, and short story writer
- C. L. Grace, a pen name of Paul C. Doherty (born 1946), English author, educator, lecturer, and historian
- Curtis Grace, American politician
- Dan Grace (1885–1957), Irish hurler
- Hannah Grace (born 1993), Welsh musical artist
- Helen Grace (born 1971), British actress
- Helen Grace (director), Welsh director
- James B. Grace (born 1951), American ecologist
- Jim Grace (1868–1938), Australian rules footballer
- John Grace (disambiguation), several people
- Kohai Grace (born 1966), New Zealand weaver
- Laura Jane Grace (born 1980), American musician
- Maggie Grace (born 1983), American actress
- Mark Grace (born 1964), American retired Major League Baseball player
- Mckenna Grace (born 2006), American child actress
- Michael Grace (disambiguation), several people
- Nancy Grace (born 1959), American legal commentator and television journalist
- Oliver Grace (fl. 1689), Chief Remembrancer of the Irish Exchequer and Member of Parliament
- Oliver Dowell John Grace (1791–1871), member of Parliament for Roscommon
- Paris Campbell Grace (born 1992), American comedian, singer, and internet celebrity
- Patricia Grace (born 1937), New Zealand writer of novels, short stories, and children's books
- Ricky Grace (born 1966), American-Australian basketball player
- Ted Grace (1931–2020), Australian politician
- Thomas Grace (disambiguation), several people
- Topher Grace (born 1978), American actor
- Victoria Grace, New Zealand academic
- W. G. Grace (1848–1915), English doctor and cricketer
- William M. Grace (1934–2004), American real estate developer
- William Russell Grace (1832–1904), Irish-American politician and founder of W. R. Grace and Company
- Willie Grace (1917–2006), American professional baseball player in the Negro leagues
- Grace baronets, English hereditary title

== Fictional characters ==
- Young Mr Grace and Old Mr Grace, owners of Grace Brothers (Are You Being Served?)
- Sister Maggie, born Maggie Grace Marvel superhero Daredevil's mother
- Dr Ryland Grace main character of Project Hail Mary
