= Entertainment (disambiguation) =

Entertainment is an event, performance, or activity designed to give pleasure to an audience.

Entertainment or Entertain may also refer to:

== Film and television ==
- E!, formerly Entertainment Television
- Entertainment (2014 film), a 2014 Bollywood film also known as It's Entertainment
- Entertainment (2015 film), a 2015 American film
- "Entertainment", a Series E episode of the television series QI (2007)
- RTL CBS Entertainment, a Southeast Asian TV channel simply known as "Entertainment" prior to the rebranding as Blue Ant Entertainment

== Literature ==
- Entertain Magazine, a 2007–10 British entertainment magazine
- Entertainment Weekly, an American magazine (sometimes abbreviated as EW)

== Music ==
- Entertainment (band), a post-punk band formed in 2002
- Entertainment (Fischerspooner album), 2009
- Entertainment (Waterparks album), 2018
- Entertainment!, a 1979 Gang of Four album
- "Entertainment" (song), a 2013 song by the band Phoenix
- "Entertainment", a track on Appeal to Reason, a 2008 album by Rise Against
- "Entertain", a track on The Woods, a 2005 album by Sleater-Kinney

== Other ==
- entertainment.ie, an Irish entertainment website
- MD Entertainment (Production), an Indonesian house film production founded in Jakarta

== See also ==
- Entertainer (disambiguation)
- That's Entertainment (disambiguation)
- Entertainment district
- The Entertainment Quarter, Sydney, Australia
- Amusement
