= William Grace =

William Grace may refer to:

- William Russell Grace (1832–1904), mayor of New York and the founder of W. R. Grace and Company
- W. G. Grace (William Gilbert Grace, 1848–1915), English cricketer
- William M. Grace (1934–2004), casino developer
- Billy Grace (1876–1938), Australian rules footballer
- Willie Grace (1917–2006), American baseball player
- Several of the Grace baronets

== See also ==
- Grace (surname), a list of people with the name
