= Bell Hollow =

American band

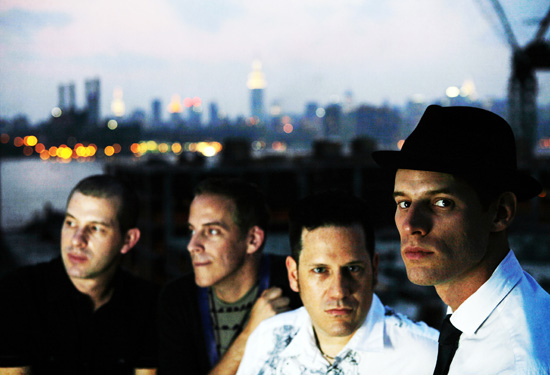
- from left to right: Christopher Bollman, Todd Karasik, Greg Fasolino, Nick Niles

Background information
- Origin: Brooklyn, New York, United States
- Genres: Dream pop, post-punk revival, alternative rock
- Years active: 2003–2009
- Labels: Five03 Records, RCRD LBL
- Past members: Christopher Bollman; Greg Fasolino; Hayden Millsteed; Nick Niles; Todd Karasik
- Website: www.bellhollow.com

Bell Hollow were a post-punk revival band based in Brooklyn, New York, composed of Nick Niles (vocals, keyboards, guitar), Greg Fasolino (guitar), Christopher Bollman (bass) and Todd Karasik (drums). The band's music was often categorized as a blend of atmospheric 1980s post-punk and dream pop, and also encompassed elements of shoegaze, indie rock, gothic rock and new wave.

The band's primary influences included the Chameleons, the Smiths, Radiohead, Cocteau Twins, the Comsat Angels, Slowdive, the Sound and Echo & the Bunnymen. Said The Guardian and Vice journalist Basim Usmani: "A lot of revival bands rely on a caricaturized impression of the decade they're apeing. That's why post-punk revival bands can leave me frustrated. They're a cliff notes version of a life-altering text. Bell Hollow is the next chapter in that text."

The band's songs and live show won over several publications, including The Big Takeover (who said, "It's rare to find new music so heavy and yet so heavenly and light at the same time"), The Deli, UK music journalist Mick Mercer and New York Press (who said, "Experience pays off with Bell Hollow, as the band brings a childish genre into adulthood"). Anti-Mag interviewed the band and proclaimed, "Beautifully delayed guitars reminiscent of a certain Mr. Smith, shining drums really caught my ear, and a heavenly voice radiated from the stage. I had found my childhood again."

Bell Hollow were interviewed on several New York radio stations, including East Village Radio and BreakThru Radio, playing live on the latter, as well as Detroit podcast Most People Are DJs. Over the course of their three-year public career, Bell Hollow performed with New Model Army, Bush Tetras, Soundpool, Robbers on High Street, the Prids, Longwave, the Kominas, Stellarscope, Lene Lovich, Entertainment, Frank the Baptist and Bunnydrums, among others.

== History ==
Bell Hollow was formed in 2003 by Fasolino and Bollman, both members of influential 1980s New York City outfit the Naked and the Dead, who had briefly reunited during 2002. They soon added drummer Hayden Millsteed (also a member of Lubricated Goat).

In 2005, singer Niles joined the band, filling out the sound and solidifying their direction. An initial four-song eponymous demo quickly garnered them local and European media attention.

Freshly signed to Five03 records in spring 2006, the band recorded their first EP, Sons of the Burgess Shale, which was issued that October. Said AllMusic's Jo-Ann Greene: "If any reminder was needed of the incestuous relationship between post-punk, early new wave, goth, and later, shoegazers and dream poppers, Bell Hollow's Sons of the Burgess Shale EP provided a crucial primer. In the space of four songs, the band zapped the zeitgeist of heady days between punk's final funeral pyre and the phoenix-like rise to success from its ashes of the New Romantics". Tom Murphy of Westword in Denver said, "While so many latter-day post-punk bands fall all over themselves trying to mimic the more danceable moments of a Gang of Four record, Bell Hollow chooses to embrace atmosphere and mood".

In late 2006, Karasik (formerly of New York indie pop band My Favorite, and also a member of the Secret History) replaced Millsteed. Their first performance with the new lineup was at the annual Winterfest arts festival at the Crane Arts Building in Philadelphia, promoted by InLiquid, who said, "The Bunnydrums were good, but Bell Hollow, in retrospect, stole the show".

The band recorded their first full-length record, Foxgloves, at Water Music in Hoboken during June 2007, with producer/engineer Hillary Johnson at the helm. Guest musicians on the album included Joshua Strawn of Blacklist playing acoustic guitar on the track "Eyes Like Planets", and Andrea Vaughn of My Favorite, performing backing vocals on "Getting On in Years." Foxgloves was released by Five03 in November 2007, to considerable acclaim. AllMusic called it "a mesmerizing album that will haunt listeners for years to come". The album made No. 18 on the list of "Best Rock, Electronic, & Folk Albums of the 2000s, Pt. 1" on CultureCatch, whose Steve Holtje said, "There were lots of acts looking to the early '80s for inspiration, but few managed to do such a good job of drawing on that era's iconic sonic aspects without actually sounding like they were imitating particular bands".

Johnson soon became the band's live keyboard player (and eventually, manager).

Bell Hollow toured the Southeast and Midwest during 2008, including concerts in New Orleans, Atlanta, Athens, Buffalo and Detroit. NBC 4 in Washington, D.C. previewed the tour, with Chris Gerard saying, "Foxgloves was clearly a labor of love - the songs are exquisitely crafted and expertly performed, and they all have real feeling and drive...producing a record that appeals both to die-hard post-punk aficionados still pining for that rare Chameleons 45 that they lost in their parents basement 25 years ago, as well as a new generation of fans who are under the delusion that the Killers' kinetic new-wave sound is original".

In the summer of 2008, Bell Hollow signed with online music purveyors RCRD LBL, releasing five free remixes from Project Jenny, Project Jan; hip hop producer/remixer Phofo; Nine Inch Nails remixer Halo33; Cruel Black Dove; and Peter Du Charme (aka Master Cylinder, of "Jung at Heart" fame). The five remixes were packaged with three outtakes as a digital-only EP, Foxgloves Extras, released by Five03 in December 2008.

Vocalist Niles departed in December 2008, and in February 2009, Bell Hollow formally announced its dissolution, citing his departure as the reason. Fasolino resurfaced with project the Harrow, who released an eponymous EP in 2013 and the Silhouettes album in 2015. Karasik formed the Chandler Estate with Vaughn and other former My Favorite members, releasing the Infrastructure EP in 2016.

== In popular culture ==
"Copper Crayon (Project Jenny, Project Jan Remix)" was featured in the "Dating" episode of NBC television series Kath & Kim, which aired on November 6, 2008.

== Members ==
- Christopher Bollman - bass (2003-2008)
- Greg Fasolino - guitar (2003-2008)
- Hayden Millsteed - drums (2003-2006)
- Nick Niles - vocals, keyboards, guitar (2005-2008)
- Todd Karasik - drums (2006-2008)

== Discography ==
=== Studio albums ===
- Foxgloves CD (2007, Five03 Records)

=== EPs ===
- Bell Hollow demo CDR (2005, self-released)
- Sons of the Burgess Shale CD (2006, Five03 Records)
- Foxgloves Extras digital (2008, Five03 Records)

=== Singles ===
- "Copper Crayon (Project Jenny, Project Jan Remix)" digital (2008, RCRD LBL)
- "Eyes Like Planets (Halo 33 Remix)" digital (2008, RCRD LBL)
- "Getting On in Years (Phofo Remix)" digital (2008, RCRD LBL)
- "Lowlights (Cruel Black Dove Remix)" digital (2008, RCRD LBL)
- "The Bottle Tree (Peter Du Charme Remix)" digital (2008, RCRD LBL)
- "Jamais Vu (The Harrow Remix)" digital (2009, The Harrow)

=== Compilation appearances ===
- "Contact" (The Prids cover) on Dots to Connect: The Music of the Prids digital (2009, Five03 Records)
- "The Bottle Tree" on Gothic Compilation 43 CD (2009, Bat Believer/Audioglobe)
