= Michael Grace =

Michael Grace may refer to:

- Michael P. Grace (1842–1920), international businessman
- Michael P. Grace II (1917–1995), Broadway producer and lyricist
- Mick Grace (1874–1912), Australian rules footballer
- Mike Grace (third baseman) (born 1956), former Major League Baseball third baseman
- Mike Grace (pitcher) (born 1970), former Major League Baseball pitcher
- Michael Grace Jr., core member and songwriter of bands My Favorite and The Secret History
