= Damian Ramsey =

American poet and musician

Damian Ramsey (1978–2007) was a musician, poet, composer and musicologist who invented the music genre word "synthpunk" in 1999 in order to retroactively describe synthesizer-based punk bands from 1977 to 1984. He documented this obscure and relatively neglected corner of American music history on synthpunk.org from 1999 to 2004.

He recorded and performed in the bands "Extent" and "I/O" and completed a solo CD called "Let Knowledge Serve the City" in 2004. An additional solo CD named "Plans" was finished in 2006.

Damian's signature dancing style can be seen in The Prids' music video "Let It Go" during the 2:58-3:09 portion, which proves treacherous for his 4-track deck.

As a computer scientist he had worked at Intel and at Cognex, a robotics company in Portland, Oregon.

Damian died of stomach cancer on April 23, 2007. The legacy of his musicological archiving and documentation and the posthumous release of his music is being continued by friends, family, collaborators and fellow musicologists.
