= Joan Wadleigh Curran =

American artist (1950–2023)

- Born: Paterson, New Jersey
- Died: Gladwyne, Pennsylvania
- Education: Skidmore College (B.S.), Yale University (M.F.A.)
- Occupations: Painter, visual artist, printmaker
- Years active: 1974–2023
- Movement: Contemporary realism

Joan Wadleigh Curran (April 27, 1950 – March 29, 2023) was an American visual artist, painter, and printmaker active in Philadelphia, known primarily for her figurative paintings and drawings in which she addressed the intersection of the natural world and human intervention. Between 2001 and 2016, Curran served as Senior Lecturer in Painting and Drawing at the University of Pennsylvania.

== Life and work ==
Born in Paterson, New Jersey, Curran received a B.S. in art from Skidmore College in 1972 and her M.F.A. from Yale University in 1974. In 1974, she began teaching studio art at LaGrange College in Troup County, Georgia, where she worked until 1977.

When discussing her own work, the artist explained that painting provided her "with an opportunity to connect to the physical world", allowing her in turn to understand "the relationship between the tangible presence of real objects and their ability to trigger an intangible response". According to the art critic Adriana Rabinovitch, Curran "anthropomorphizes what we call garbage in a manner that spurs a deeper investigation into the cycle of life of an object". Writing in a 1989 review for The Philadelphia Inquirer, Edward J. Sozanski said that Curran's paintings "amplify the 19th-century idea of the painting as a window into the landscape by nesting several layers of perception one inside the other".

Fish on a Plate, 1982, Gouache on paper. The collection of the Woodmere Museum of Art, Philadelphia.

Throughout her career, Curran received grants from the Independence Foundation, the Pennsylvania Council for the Arts, and was twice a finalist in the Pew Fellowship for the Arts. In 2017, Curran completed a residency at the Civitella Ranieri Foundation in Umbria, Italy, where she created a series of gouache paintings and drawings inspired by the natural environment and the physical surroundings of the foundation's 15th-century castle, some of which were later exhibited in Curran's solo show titled Instability at InLiquid Gallery in Philadelphia in 2019. She was also the recipient of the 2018 Awagami Print Award by The Print Center in Philadelphia.

=== Exhibitions and collections ===
Curran held solo exhibitions at the Lamar Dodd Art Center in LaGrange, West Georgia College (now University of West Georgia) in Carrollton, Callaway Gardens in Pine Mountain, and Seraphin Gallery in Philadelphia, among other venues in the United States. She was included in over 100 group shows, including exhibitions at the Courtauld Institute of Art in London, Michener Art Museum, High Museum of Art in Atlanta, and Pennsylvania Academy of the Fine Arts, among other institutions. Her work is included in permanent collections of multiple American museums, including the Columbus Museum in Columbus, Georgia, the High Museum of Art in Atlanta, the New Jersey State Museum in Trenton, the Woodmere Art Museum in Philadelphia, the Lamar Dodd Art Center, Georgia State Art Collection, and the Pennsylvania Convention Center Art Collection.

=== Death ===
Curran died on 29 March 2023 of complications from metastatic cancer at the age of 72.
