= We Know, Plato! =

American indie rock band

We Know, Plato! was an indie rock band based in Richmond, Virginia. The band was formed when Mark Strong moved back to Richmond from LA and found Benvolio Willson's solo work online. The lineup solidified with Daniel Medley joining in Summer of 2007 and Todd Baker joining in early 2008, during the recording of their second EP, "Turn On the Outside Lights", which never came to fruition.

We Know, Plato!’s greatest successes came at the end of their days and after, landing songs on the shows Gossip Girl, The New Girl, Blue Mountain State, and The Beautiful Life. They have also been featured in numerous blogs, newspapers, and websites.

== History ==
In 2005, Mark Strong, former bassist and then keyboardist of The Waking Hour and multi-instrumentalist/co-songwriter for Edison Gower, had come back to Richmond from a brief stint in California and browsed the internet where he found Richmond musician Benvolio Willson and contacted him with a means to collaborate.

Willson was still finishing up college, recording solo songs in dorm room, and playing with Harrisonburg, Va band "Roy Rogers". Being away at college initially made it hard for the two to efficiently collaborate but, by late 2006, they had shared a show together as separate musicians, and in early 2007 We Know, Plato! was formed.

In the fall of 2007 the duo enlisted Richmond-newcomer Daniel Medley fresh out of high school. We Know, Plato! played two shows as a trio. Shortly after New Zealand keyboardist/vocalist Julia Manhire, was recruited. In the end of April 2008, bassist Steve Chiles, having formerly played for the band Brian Bachman and the New Romancers, entered the band as the final member of WK,P!.

In the wake of both Steve departing the band to dedicate his time to family/work, and Julia's departure due to time constraints, the band acquired a new bassist- Daniel Medley's brother-in-law, Todd Baker.

We Know, Plato! disbanded in June 2009 due to both Willson's and Strong's preference to concentrate on a more focused, truer sound, as was soon to be found in their side-project "Carlyle Petes' Chessmen of Doom", which became Make Phantoms. A few years later, Medley and Baker would re-team with Willson for experimental, indie post-rock band Those Manic Seas, and Willson and Strong would morph into indie pop-rock band Witherwolf.

== Members ==
- Benvolio Willson - Piano, Vocals, Lyrics (2006–2009)
- Mark Strong - Guitar, Vocals (2006–2009)
- Daniel Medley - Drums, Synths (2007–2009)
- Todd Baker - Bass (2008–2009)

=== Former ===
- Steve Chiles - Bass (2007–2008)
- Julia Manhire - Vocals, Keyboard (2007–2008)

== Discography ==
- In Moonlit Sound (2007)
- Turn On the Outside Lights (2009) (unreleased)
