= Entertainer (disambiguation) =

An entertainer is a person who entertains (singer, actor, comedian, etc.)

Entertainer or The Entertainer may also refer to:

== Music ==
=== Songs ===
- "Entertainer" (song), by Zayn, 2018
- "The Entertainer" (rag), a 1902 classic piano rag written by Scott Joplin
- "The Entertainer" (Billy Joel song), 1974
- "The Entertainer", a 1983 song by The Belle Stars

=== Albums ===
- The Entertainer (Jaki Byard album), 1972
- The Entertainer (D'banj album), 2008
- The Entertainer (Alesha Dixon album), 2010
- The Entertainer (video), a 2006 DVD collection of television specials and music videos by Garth Brooks
- The Entertainer, by Marvin Hamlisch, 1974

== Media ==
- The Entertainer (play), a 1957 play by John Osborne
  - The Entertainer (1960 film), a film adaptation of the play
  - The Entertainer (1975 film), a TV film adaptation of the play
- The Entertainers (radio program), a Canadian radio show 1978–1992

== Television ==
=== Episodes ===
- "The Entertainer", a 1962 episode of The Flintstones
- "The Entertainer", a 1993 episode of Bob
- "The Entertainer", a 2002 episode of Black Books
- "The Entertainer", a 2004 episode of Samurai 7
- "The Entertainer", a 2011 episode of Paradise Café
- "The Entertainer", a 2019 episode of The Detour

=== Shows ===
- Entertainer (TV series), a 2016 South Korean series
- The Entertainers, a 1964 CBS television show, with hosts: Bob Newhart, Carol Burnett, and Caterina Valente
- Entertainers with Byron Allen, an American television series
- The Entertainers, a 1991 ABC television film starring Bob Newhart and Linda Gray
- The Entertainer, a 1993 BBC adaptation of the Osbourne play, aired as an episode of Performance (British)
- The Entertainer, a 2005 reality television show hosted by Wayne Newton

== Companies ==
- The Entertainer (discount publisher), a publisher of coupon books
- The Entertainer (retailer), British toy chain

== Other ==
- Cedric the Entertainer (born 1964), American actor and comedian
- "The Entertainer", a 2007 contestant on the VH1 reality show I Love New York 2 and other reality shows
- a nickname of John Parrott, snooker player
- The Entertainers, a nickname given to Newcastle United during the 90's
