= Civitella Ranieri Foundation =

American artists' community in Umbria, Italy

- Type: Artist Colony
- Location: Umbertide, Italy
- Website: http://www.civitella.org/

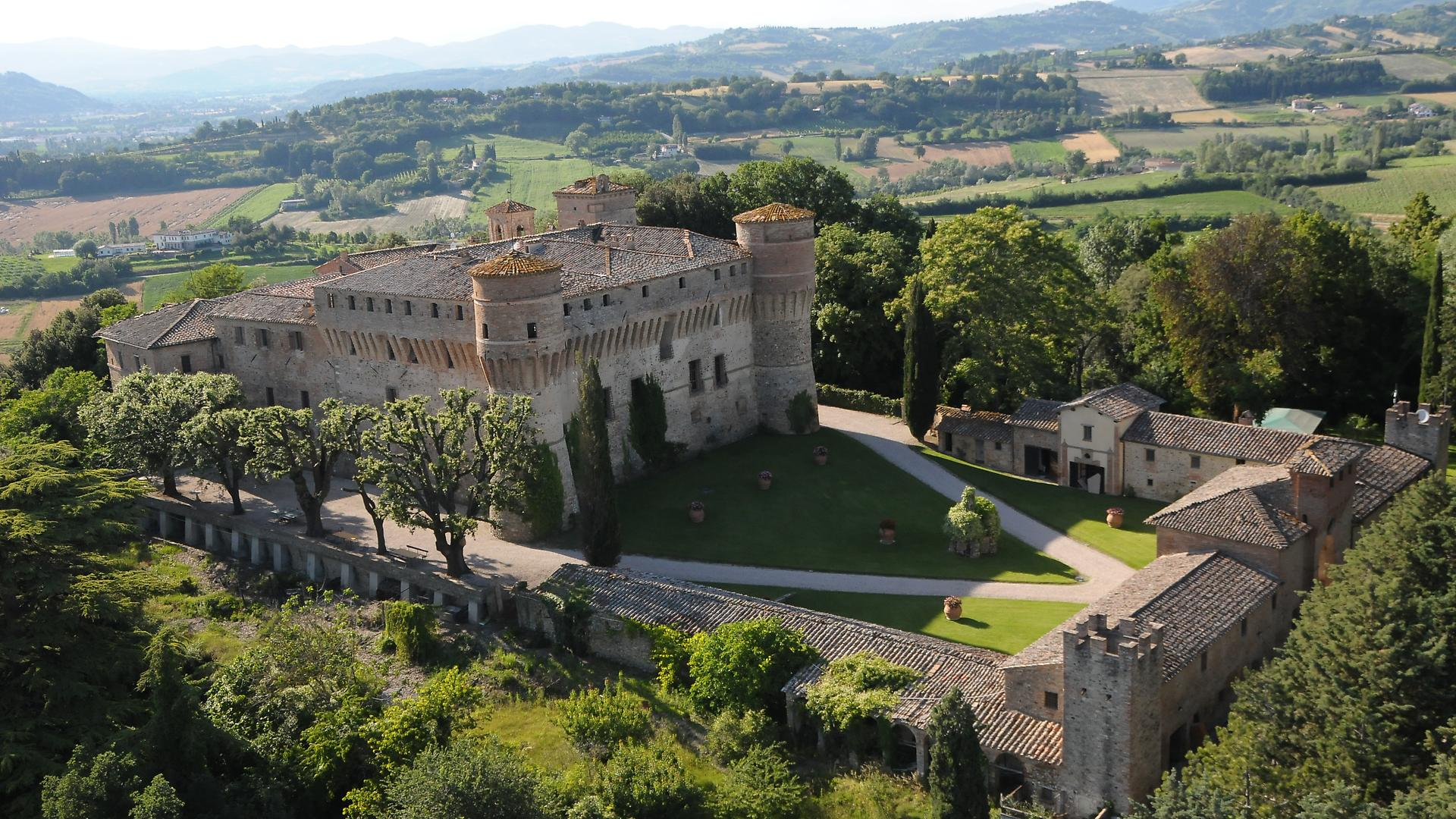
Civitella Ranieri Castle

The Civitella Ranieri Foundation is an American artists’ community located at a 15th-century castle in the Umbria region of Italy.

The Foundation provides four sessions of six-week long unstructured residencies every year to visual artists, writers and composers; and, occasionally, it organizes events for the general public.

Founded by arts philanthropist Ursula Corning in 1995. In the last decade of her life, Ursula often wondered aloud, "What will become of my dear Civitella after I die? Will it be turned into a dusty museum?" It was at this time, with the help of Gordon Knox and Cecilia Galiena, that she began to grow Civitella's current arts program. Civitella Ranieri Foundation has hosted over 800 Fellows and Director's Guests from across the globe.

== History ==
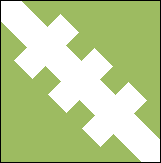
Ranieri Family Coat Of Arms

Civitella Ranieri is an early Renaissance castle in Umbria. The Ranieri family, a noble Italian bloodline, first settled in Perugia and has owned the land since the early 11th century. Ursula Corning, a distant relative to the Ranieri family, turned the castle into the Civitella Ranieri Foundation, which started operating as an artist residency in 1995.

== Foundation ==
Each residency community at Civitella Ranieri Foundation is selected by a jury, and it brings together 12-15 international artists, writers and composers at pivotal moments in their careers.

The Foundation provides studio space, accommodation, board, and covers travel expenses.

Dana Prescott has been the Foundation's Executive Director since 2007.

== Notable alumni ==
Civitella Ranieri Fellows have been awarded numerous honors, including Pulitzer Prize, Guggenheim Fellowships, Fulbright Grants, National Endowment for the Arts Grants and Fellowships, and MacArthur Foundation Grants. Compositions by Civitella Ranieri Music Fellows have been performed by symphonies worldwide and have received awards such as the Grammy’s; Civitella Ranieri Visual Arts Fellows are represented in museum collections and exhibitions, such as the Venice Biennale and the Whitney Biennial; Writing Fellows have received awards such as the National Book Award.

=== Notable fellows ===
==== Film ====
- Mabel Cheung
- Atom Egoyan

==== Music ====
- Martin Bresnick
- Du Yun
- John Harbison
- Alexander Hawkins
- Fred Hersch
- Anders Hillborg
- Johann Johannsson
- Tania Leon
- Andrew Norman
- Pauline Oliveros
- Elliott Sharp
- Esperanza Spalding
- Elizabeth Vercoe
- Yehudi Weiner

==== Writing ====
- A. Igoni Barrett
- Andrei Bitov
- Brian Chikwava
- Henri Cole
- Billy Collins
- Mia Couto
- Kamel Daoud
- Anita Desai
- Sarah Hall
- Rachel Kushner
- Mike McCormack
- Azar Nafisi
- Robert Stone
- Mark Strand
- Kae Tempest

==== Visual Arts ====
- Allora & Calzadilla
- Emma Amos
- El Anatsui
- Alison Bechdel
- Manfredi Beninati
- Xu Bing
- Joan Wadleigh Curran
- Yun-Fei Ji
- William Kentridge
- Lat
- Kerry James Marshall
- Martha Rosler
- Matthias Weischer
- Sun Xun

=== Notable Director’s Guests ===
A select number of Director’s Guests are invited to join each residency session. Notable Director’s Guests include Vivien Greene (2016), Rosanna Warren (2015), Fred Hersch (2013), Ann Beattie (2013), Tobias Wolff (2012), John Eaton (2011), Mark Strand (2008 and 2011), James Siena (2010), and Yehudi Wyner (2009).
