= Donna Benton =

Entrepreneur and founder of The Entertainer

Donna Benton (born 1975) is an entrepreneur and founder of a UAE-based lifestyle company called The Entertainer.

== Biography ==
Originally from Melbourne Australia, Benton was born in 1975. In 2000, at age 26, she moved to Dubai to save money.

Since her original job in Dubai was unsuccessful, she founded a company The Entertainer, offering discounted lifestyle products. As of 2018, her company was operating in fifteen countries across the Middle East, Asia, Africa and Europe. As well as being the company's founder, she has also served as its CEO and chairman, a role she currently holds in 2019.

In early 2012, a subsidiary of Abraaj Capital, a regional investment fund, acquired a 50 per cent stake in the company. They announced plans in 2017 to divest their stake.

In May 2018, Benton confirmed the sale of 85% of her company for a nine figure sum to GFH Financial Group.

Benton is also a mother of two children.

== Awards ==
Benton received Esquire Middle East's Man at His Best Award for her work through The Entertainer. She was also featured among Forbes Middle East's Most Influential Women of 2018.
