= A Million Machines =

American electronic music band

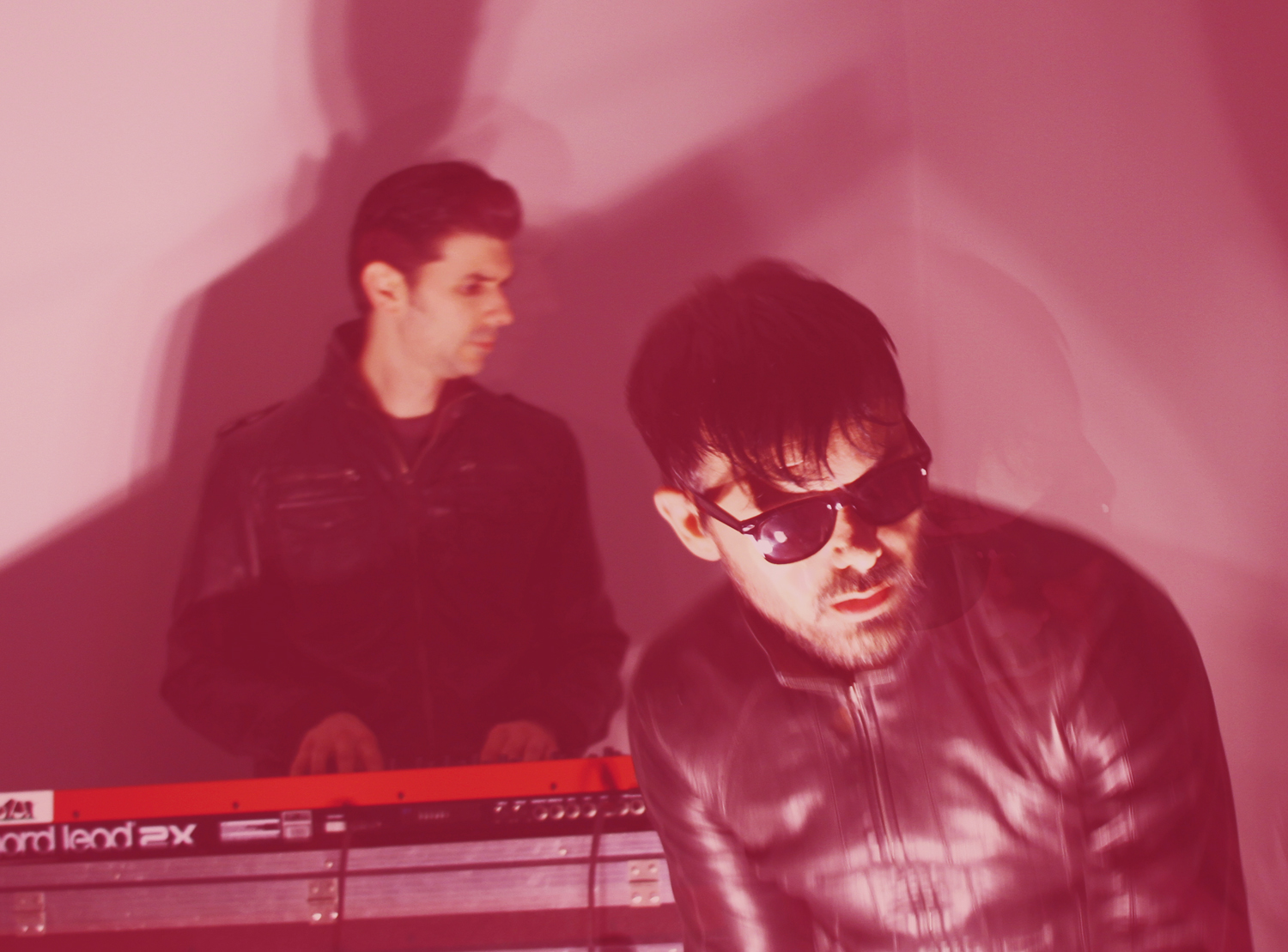
- A Million Machines (2014)

Background information
- Origin: Silver Lake, Los Angeles, United States
- Genres: Electronic, indie rock, post-punk revival, dance-punk, new wave
- Years active: 2013–present
- Members: MIG; Fate Fatal
- Website: www.facebook.com/millionmachines

A Million Machines is an electronic music band from Silver Lake, California. Its members include producer/multi-instrumentalist MIG (The New Room), and vocalist Fate Fatal (The Deep Eynde / Bomp! Records, Kittens for Christian / Sony Records).

Fusing low-res electronic noise and pop hooks, A Million Machines began as a one-off band during a gallery opening in Downtown Los Angeles at LA Art Walk. After being showcased on local college radio stations including KXLU in Los Angeles, the band's sound quickly progressed to incorporate various areas of electronic music; electroclash, shoegazing, electropunk and electropop.

MIG's ten-year experience with his band The New Room brings influences from Wire, Kraftwerk, The Editors, Throbbing Gristle and Killing Joke, and Fate Fatal's twenty years with gothic band The Deep Eynde bring a vocal style with 80/90's influences of Dave Gahan (Depeche Mode), Front 242, and John Foxx.

Year	Title	album
2013	Two Face	7" Single
2013	Tech Support	7" Single
2013	Dilemma	7" Single
2014	Undivided	7" Single
2014	My Criminal Mind	7" Single
2014	Synthetic Eyes	7" Single
2017	A Million Machines	Album
