= Love at Absolute Zero =

Studio album by My Favorite
- Released: 1999
- Genre: Indie rock
- Label: Double Agent

My Favorite chronology
Love at Absolute Zero (1999)	The Happiest Days of Our Lives (2003)

Professional ratings
Review scores
Source	Rating
AllMusic	4.5/5 stars
Pitchfork Media	7.2/10

Love at Absolute Zero is the debut album by the indie pop band My Favorite, released on Double Agent in 1999. The subject matter included the end of new wave, the new millennium, and growing up in suburban Long Island, New York.

== Critical reception ==
AllMusic wrote that the album "translates palpable pre-millennial tension into neon-lit synthesizer drama—recalling the heyday of the new wave with none of the irony which sinks like-minded retro-futurists from Romania to the Rentals." Trouser Press called it "an excellent debut, nostalgic but forward-looking at the same time."

== Track listing ==
1. Absolute Zero
2. Absolute Beginners Again
3. 17 Berlin
4. The Truth About Lake Ronkonkama
5. Let's Stay Alive
6. Go Kid Go
7. Modulate
8. Party Crashers
9. Between Cafes
10. The Informers
11. Working Class Jacket
12. You Belong With Us
