= The Deep Eynde =

American band

Background information
- Origin: Hollywood, Los Angeles, United States
- Genres: Death rock; gothic rock; horror punk
- Years active: 1989–2014
- Labels: Apollyon Antiphone, Bomp! USA, Cargo Records
- Members: Fate Fatal, Daniel Overberger, Rob Graver, Dar Larizadeh
- Past members: Tim Morbid, Killjo Zapata, Reverend Ryk, Oren Karpovsky, Robert Lokerbee, Brian Pittack , Daniel DeLeon, Justino Franco, Chris Gultry, Matt Colonna, Jae Rose (touring).
- Website: The Deep Eynde official Facebook

The Deep Eynde is an American rock band from Los Angeles, California. Most known for their past theatrical live performances (which included colored plastic wrap outfits, real blood, fake abortions, live insects, worms, and an octopus suit) the band has grown in their style to encompass punk, gothic, death rock, psychobilly, and rock and roll. The band has since been an influence for the second wave of Gothic Bands in the United States.

== History ==
The Deep Eynde roughly began in 1989 by Fate Fatal (A Million Machines), after an abrupt departure from industrial band Kittens for Christian. TDE was originally four members, Fatal on vocals, Reverend Ryk on bass and Robert Lockerbee on Guitar,and Brian Pittack on drums, however after a year, that line-up changed to Killjo Zapata on Guitar, Oren Karpovsky on Bass, and Matt Callonna on drums.

The first TDE album was recorded with the help of engineer/producer Mike Rozon using six songs from the new line-up, while the remaining electronic-based songs including Parfumery were written by Fate Fatal, while keyboard arrangement created by Arlene Meyer. With the completion in place, this album called City Lights was released by German record company, Apollyon Antiphone. The album reflected the dark influences of Siouxsie and the Banshees & Bauhaus.

In 1995, another line-up change would bring in guitarist Daniel deLeon (of The Insaints Rezurex), and eventually drummer Hal Satan aka Juan Sermeno (of Penis Flytrap), the second album Suicide Drive was released. After years of touring the states, including being regulars at NYC's infamous CBGB's, the band regrouped to record the album which they are most known for, Shadowland.

In 2004, The Deep Eynde's third album Shadowland had caught the eye of skateboard legend Duane Peters and his record label Disaster Records, a subsidiary of BOMP!USA records. In late 2004, the first American release of the Deep Eynde hit the shelves all over the United States, making The Deep Eynde's biggest release to date, crossing into Punk, Rock, Psychobilly and Gothic.

Shadowland was picked up by People Like You Records in Europe in 2005 and immediately made the charts due to previous promotion in Europe. They began touring outside the United States more with concentration on European festivals. In 2007, The Deep Eynde released their follow-up album Bad Blood, which was also released on People Like You records. They joined the Hellnights tour in Europe with The Spook, the Crimson Ghosts and Shadow Reichenstein. In 2010, The Deep Eynde released Spell*Bound on Cargo Records (Europe), which was a throwback to their original organic sound. The band toured Europe for its release, with the highlight, a headlining position during the Wave Gothic Treffen 2010.

The Deep Eynde worked on their final release in 2014, while lead singer Fate Fatal began an electronic project entitled A Million Machines.

== Line-Ups ==
Year	Band				Recordings
Year	Vocalist	Guitarist	Bassist	Drummer	Recordings
1989 – 1992?	Fate Fatal	Robert Lockerbee	Reverend Rick	Herpes	Cassette demos
1992 – 1994?	Fate Fatal	Killjo	Reverend Rick	?	
1995 – ?	Fate Fatal	Killjo	Oren Karpovsky	Cat Malonna	City Lights
1996 – 2001?	Fate Fatal	Daniel deLeon	Chris Notsoverynice	Eric Blitz, Rose	Suicide Drive EP, Suicide Drive
2001 – 2003	Fate Fatal	Daniel deLeon	Tim Morbid	Hal Satan	
2003 – 2004	Fate Fatal	Daniel deLeon, Justino Franco (album backup vocals)	Sean Vomit	Hal Satan	She Likes Skulls EP, Shadowland
Late 2004 – 2005	Fate Fatal	Eric Lau, Justino Franco	Sean Vomit	Hal Satan	
2005 – 2006	Fate Fatal	Eric Lau, Justino Franco	Paul Reyes	Hal Satan	
2006 – Mid 2007	Fate Fatal	Stress, Justino Franco, Daniel deLeon (recording only)	Rob Graver, John McCoy (recording only)	Hal Satan	Bad Blood
Mid 2007 – 2009	Fate Fatal	Stress	Rob Graver	dAr	Spell Bound
2009–Present	Fate Fatal	Stress	Rob Graver	dAr	

== Discography ==
- City Lights (1995), Apollyon Records
- Suicide Drive (2002), Apollyon Records
- Shadowland (2004), Disaster Records
- Shadowland (2005), People Like You Records
- Bad Blood (2007), People Like You Records
- Blackout (2008), People Like You Records
- Spellbound (July, 2010), Cargo Records
