= The Kids Are All Wrong =

EP by My Favorite
- Released: 2003
- Genre: Indie
- Label: Double Agent

Professional ratings
Review scores
Source	Rating
AllMusic	3/5 stars

The Kids Are All Wrong was an EP released by My Favorite on the Double Agent record label in 2003.

== Reception ==
Brad Reno of Trouser Press wrote that the EP is "full of solid songs" including "'Burning Hearts', which echoes OMD and is about two people on the receiving end of the Enola Gay's mission, and the equally somber 'The Lesser Saints'."

== Track listing ==
1. "Burning Hearts" – 5:44
2. "The Radiation" – 3:57
3. "Rescue Us" – 4:17
4. "The Lesser Saints" – 3:21
