= The Happiest Days of Our Lives: The Complete Joan of Arc Tapes 2CD =

The Happiest Days Of Our Lives

Compilation album by My Favorite
- Released: 2003
- Genre: Indie
- Label: Double Agent

My Favorite chronology
Love at Absolute Zero (1999)	The Happiest Days Of Our Lives (2003)

Professional ratings
Review scores
Source	Rating
Allmusic	link

The Happiest Days of Our Lives: The Complete Joan of Arc Tapes was a 2CD compilation album released by My Favorite on the Double Agent record label in 2003. It compiled the group's then out-of-print "Joan of Arc" material. The second disc is a collection of remixes by such bands as Soviet, Flowchart, and Future Bible Heroes.

== Track listing ==
1. The Happiest Days of My Life [#] 3:02
2. Homeless Club Kids 5:12
3. The Suburbs Are Killing Us 3:45
4. L=P 3:22
5. Burning Hearts 5:42
6. A Cathedral at Night [#] 4:53
7. White Roses for Blue Girls 4:04
8. John Dark (Goodnight, Major Tom) 3:15
9. Half There and Dancing [#] 3:51
10. The Black Cassette 3:21
11. Badge (Grace Under Pressure) 3:45
12. Le Monster 4:58
13. The Radiation 3:56
14. James Dean (Awaiting Ambulance) [#] 3:48
15. Rescue Us 4:17
16. The Lesser Saints 3:21
17. The Suburbs Are Killing Us [Double Agent Remix] 4:32
18. Homeless Club Kids [Future Bible Heroes Remix] 8:22
19. Badge [Soviet Remix] 3:48
20. Le Monster [Phofo Remix] 5:15
21. John Dark [Leisure Enthusiast Remix] 3:18
22. Rescue Us [Kitch Remix] 3:13
23. Homeless Club Kids [Alexander Perls Remix] 6:41
24. Le Monster [Flowchart Remix] 5:06
25. Badge [San Serac Remix] 4:44
26. The Suburbs Are Killing Us [Leisure Enthusiast Remix] 3:44
27. Rescue Us [Chuck Blake Remix] 3:37
28. Le Monster [Chuck Blake Remix] 4:28
29. John Dark [Brother Frost Remix] 6:46
30. Homeless Club Kids [Double Agent Remix] 5:34
