= Park Towne Place =

Historic place in Pennsylvania, United States

- Park Towne Place Apartment Homes
- U.S. National Register of Historic Places
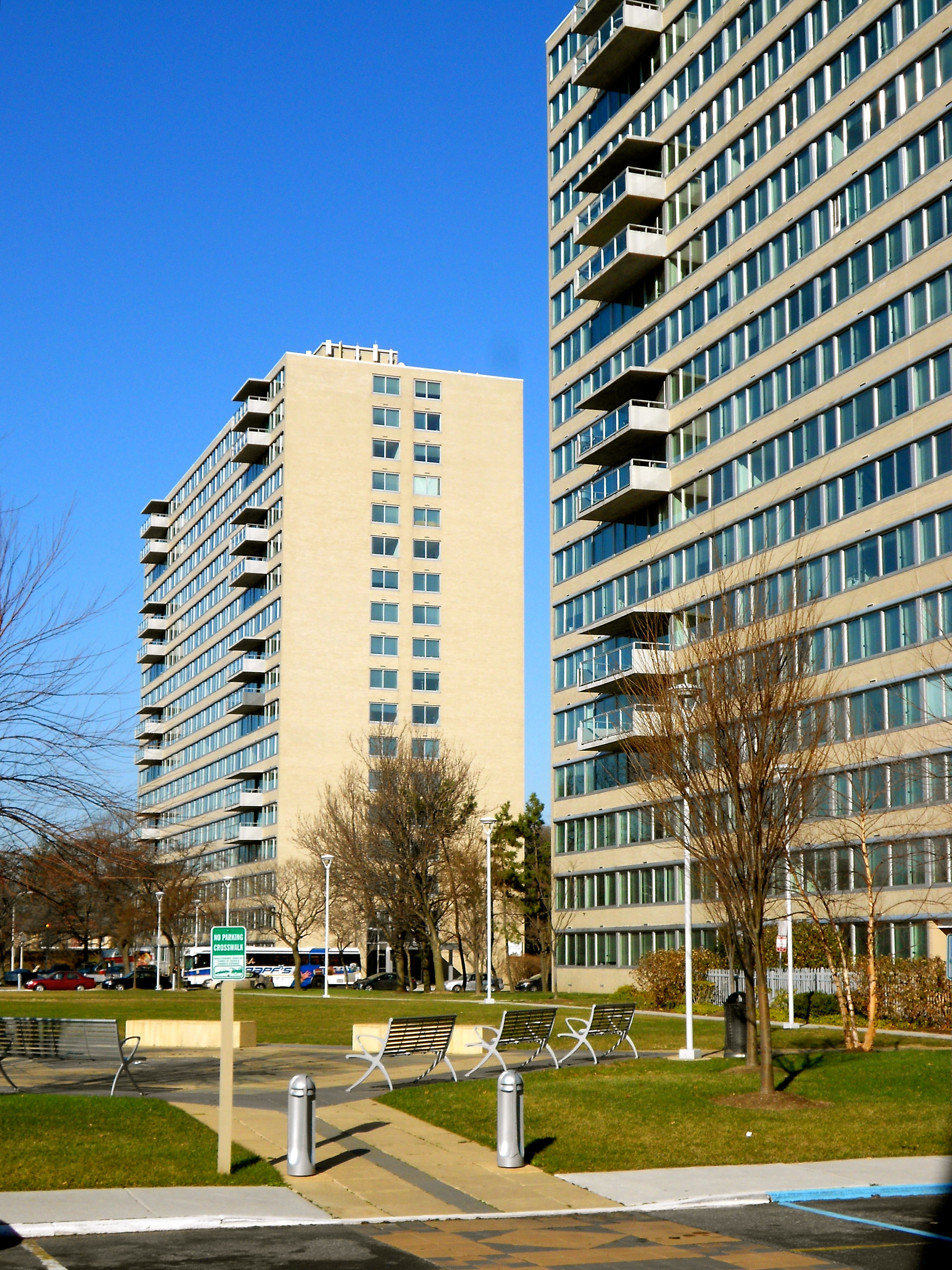
- Park Towne Place Apartments, January 2012
- Location: 2200 Benjamin Franklin Pkwy., Philadelphia, Pennsylvania
- Coordinates: 39°57′40″N 75°10′39″W
- Area: 10 acres (4.0 ha)
- Built: 1958
- Architect: Milton Schwartz; Louis I. Kahn; Edmund Bacon;
- Architectural style: International style
- NRHP reference No.: 11000926
- Added to NRHP: December 15, 2011

Park Towne Place is a historic apartment complex located in the Logan Square neighborhood of Philadelphia. The complex consists of four eighteen-story buildings (with floors numbered one through nineteen with no thirteen), a one-story office area, an underground parking garage, and a pool and spa complex. It was designed by Milton Schwartz in the International style, using reinforced concrete with limestone-tan brick, white marble, and bright aluminum trim and glass. It was constructed in 1958. The apartment buildings are in the shape of rectangular cuboids.

Park Towne Place is owned by AIR Communities, a real estate investment trust. In 2014, Tryba Architects of Denver was selected to renovate the complex.

Park Towne Place was added to the National Register of Historic Places in 2011, and receives a significant tax abatement as a consequence.

Park Towne Place hosts an art program with rotational exhibitions curated by InLiquid throughout the year. It also hosts a permanent art collection of more than 150 artworks from over 110 artists. Art can be seen and experienced throughout the four towers, and property grounds.

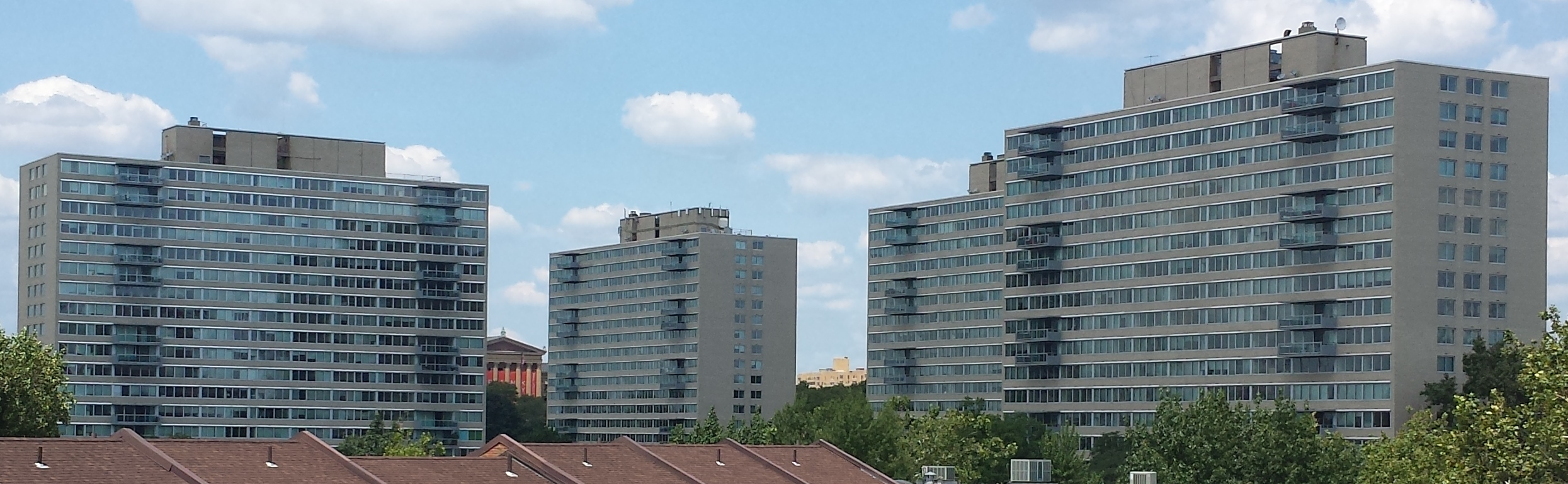
The four towers of Park Towne Place, viewed from the southeast. From left to right are the South, West, North, and East buildings. The Philadelphia Museum of Art is partially visible between the South and West buildings.

In September 2021, all four towers were evacuated following flooding caused by Tropical Storm Ida.
