= John Grace =

John Grace may refer to:

== Politics ==
- John Grace (British politician) (1886–1972), British Member of Parliament for Wirral 1924–1931
- John P. Grace, mayor of Charleston, South Carolina, namesake of the John P. Grace Memorial Bridge
- John W. Grace (1927–2009), first Privacy Commissioner of Canada
- John Grace (Māori leader) (1905–1985), New Zealand interpreter, public servant, community leader and High Commissioner to Fiji

== Sports ==
- John Grace (Canadian football) (born 1977), Canadian Football League player
- John Grace (Irish footballer) (born 1964), Irish footballer

== Others ==
- John Hilton Grace (1873–1958), British mathematician
