= A Spectre Is Haunting Europe =

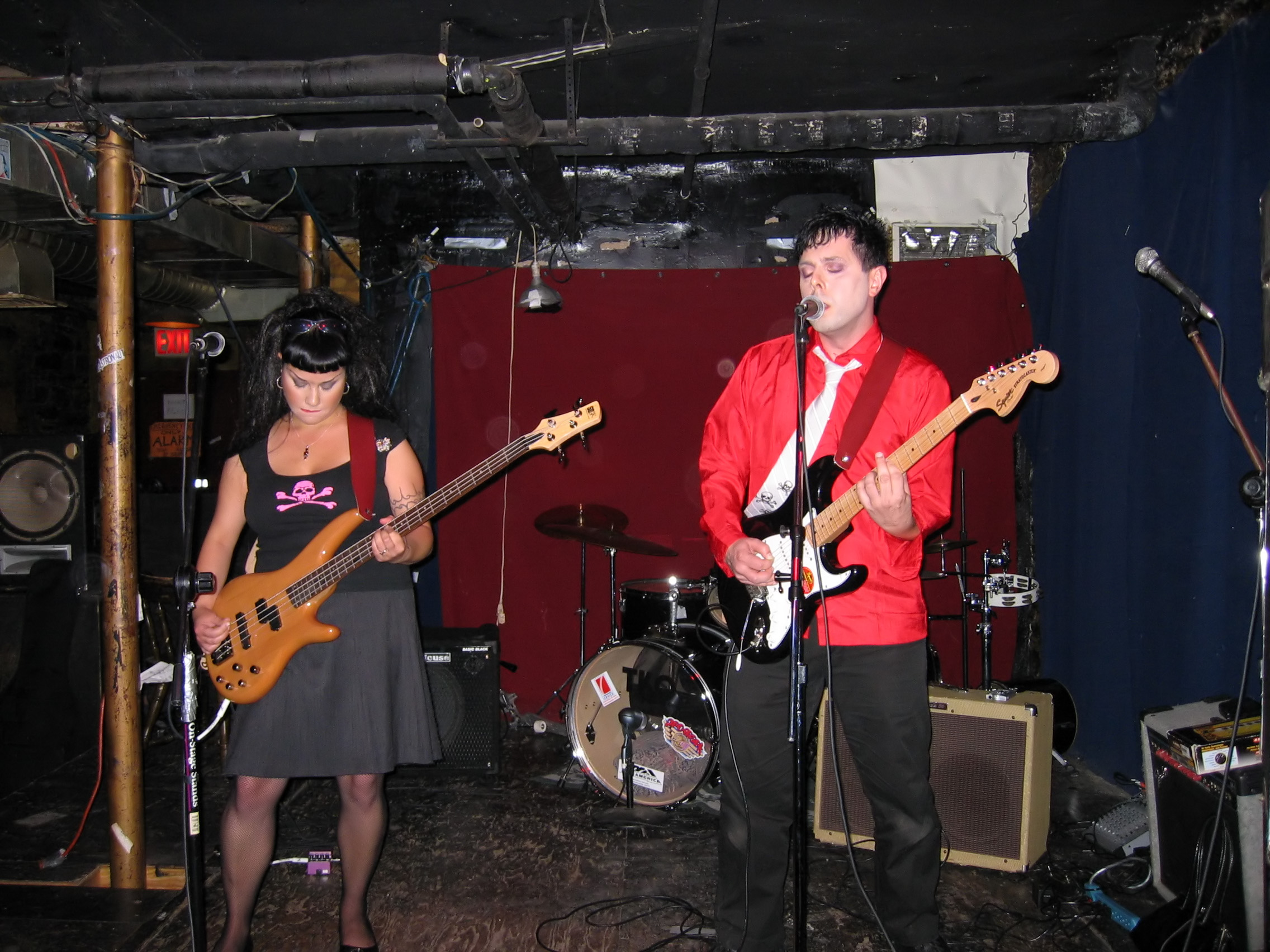
- A Spectre Is Haunting Europe, September 2004

Background information
- Also known as: Decora
- Origin: Vancouver, British Columbia, Canada
- Genre: Deathrock
- Years active: 2002–2009
- Label: Simulacre

A Spectre Is Haunting Europe was a Canadian deathrock band from Vancouver, British Columbia.

== History ==
A Spectre Is Haunting Europe was formed in 2002, during the height of Vancouver's post-punk revival, and was initially billed as Decora. The band's activity was intermittent for the first two years. The name refers to the first sentence of The Communist Manifesto (1848). The band subsequently continued its activities in Vancouver, releasing music and performing as part of the city's independent music scene. Its name has been described as a reference to the opening line of the 1848 political text.

It was not until 2004 that the band found a niche with its brand of politicized post-punk and subsequently changed its name to A Spectre Is Haunting Europe. Their first album, Astonishing Tales of the Sea, was released that year. Through a succession of different drummers, the band stretched this material in a few different directions at once, culminating in a caustic 2004 appearance at the Drop Dead Festival in New York City. In early 2006, Phil Western joined the group as drummer.

With their 2006 album, Flames, the band broadened its appeal to include a more general indie rock audience. Its recordings have been reviewed in music media.

In 2008, the band released its third album, Embers, as a creative commons free digital release.

== Discography ==
=== Albums ===
- Astonishing Tales of the Sea (Simulacre) – 2004
- Flames (Simulacre) – 2006
- Embers (Simulacre) – 2008

=== Singles ===
- "Servers/Stop" (split 12" single with Entertainme.nt) (Simulacre/aDistant) – 2006

=== Compilations ===
- "New Dark Age 4" (Strobelight Records) – 2006
- "Smoke and Spotlight" (X-Pop Society) – 2006
