= Mannequin Depressives =

Canadian synthpop group

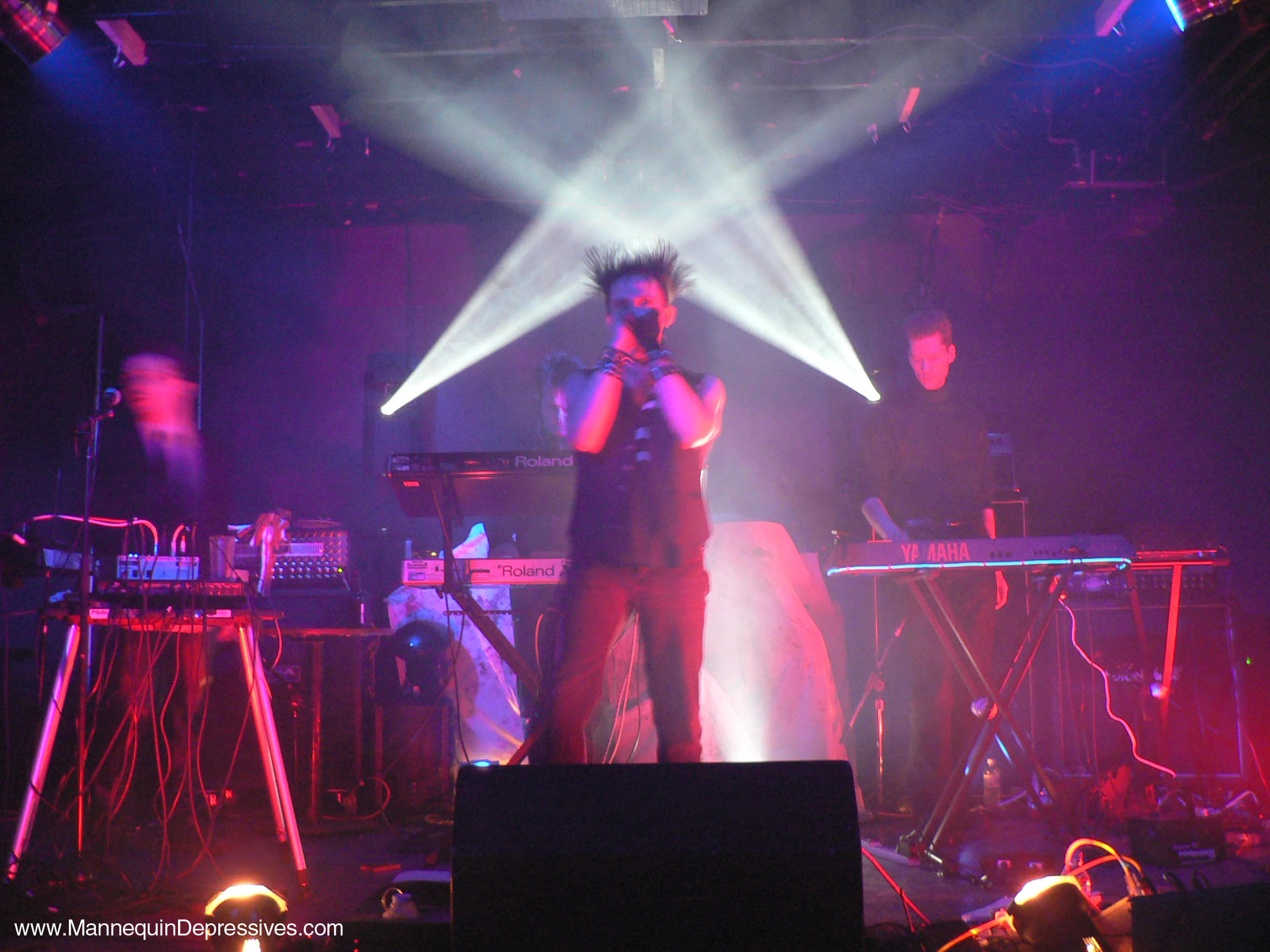
- Live performance

Background information
- Origin: Calgary, Alberta, Canada
- Genres: Synthpop; EBM
- Years active: 1998–present
- Labels: Klankboom Productions
- Members: Rod C. Dornian; Russ Magee; Scott Johns; Nebulous
- Website: mannequindepressives.com

Mannequin Depressives are a Canadian synthpop group formed in 1998 in Calgary.

Current members are: Rod C. Dornian (lead vocals, percussion, keyboards), Russ Magee (guitars, live percussion, vocals, keyboards), Scott (Smoth) Johns (lead guitar, keyboards, vocals, custom noise), and Nebulous (keyboards, vocals, analogue synthesiser programming).

== Name ==
The band's name is taken from a humorous intertitle on a Saturday Night Live episode (Season 5, Episode 7, 1979) that was shown before David Bowie performed with Klaus Nomi.

== History ==
In the late-1980s, Dornian conducted preliminary recordings for what was later to become the project Mannequin Depressives. Having met Smoth in 1997, Nebulous in 1998, and Magee soon after, the line-up was complete. Recordings continued, and tracks were re-worked to form a number of EPs—culminating in their first official full-length album release, Trash-Eighty, in 2002.

Inspired by the post-punk scene of the late 1970s and early 1980s, Mannequin Depressives set out to essentially duplicate the sound of the early 1980s New Wave era, while combining modern elements. Their approach to electronic music is rooted in the rock band ethos of the late 1970s, with a focus on the use of electronic instruments interchangeably with traditional instruments. This is in contrast to the electronic music industry's recent laptop revolution, in which compositions are exclusively (or for the most part) generated via a software interface.

The most recent full-length release by Mannequin Depressives was their second album, Girls Are Evil. This 2008 production's arrival was marked by a massive CD release party spanning The Warehouse and Underground nightclubs in Calgary, Alberta, Canada, on March 20, 2008. Mannequin Depressives has performed alongside bands of similar genres, including: Left Spine Down, The Rabid Whole, iVardensphere, Combichrist, and The Birthday Massacre.

A darker and more symphonic project, Voltage Control has often been described as atmospheric electro-industrial. To date, two full-length Voltage Control studio albums are known to exist, in addition to a series of live recordings. Both Mannequin Depressives and Voltage Control are signed to the Klankboom Productions label.

== Discography ==
- Subtle (1999) (Demo)
- Meaningless is a virtue (1999) (EP)
- Music For Your Tape Recorder (2000) (CD - EP)
- Reach (2002) (Single)
- Trash-Eighty (album)|Trash-Eighty (2002) (CD - LP)
- Sweet Disease (2005) (Single)
- Girls Are Evil (album)|Girls Are Evil (2008) (CD - LP)
- Recycle (2009) (CD - EP)
- Incorrect Mechanical Alignment (2010) (CD - EP)
