= List of Samurai 7 episodes =

This is a list of Samurai 7 episodes, an anime series based on Akira Kurosawa's Seven Samurai, but with a steampunk setting. It was directed by Toshifumi Takizawa. It consisted of twenty-six 25-minute episodes.

== Episode list ==
No.	Title	Original release date	English Airdate
1	"The Master (The Murderer)"; Transliteration: "Kiru!" (Japanese: 斬る!)	June 12, 2004	April 1, 2006
Enter a world whose past involved a large-scale war between samurai and mechanized samurai bandits, known as Nobuseri. The samurai fought a losing battle and retreated, and the war ended with an uneasy peace. Now the Nobuseri plague farming village periodically taking all their food and supplies and, sometimes, their women and children. The peasants of one village, Kanna, decide to seek samurai to fight off the Nobuseri on their behalf. Three villagers, Kirara the water priestess, Komachi her sister, and Rikichi, a farmer, set off to the city to find samurai who are willing to work for rice.
2	"The Pupil"; Transliteration: "Kuu!" (Japanese: 喰う!)	June 12, 2004	April 8, 2006
Ukyo, the son of the Magistrate, kidnaps Kirara for his harem; it is up to Rikichi and Komachi to save her, with the help of the only two samurai they've recruited: young, idealistic Katsushiro and the boisterous cyborg Kikuchiyo. The soft-spoken master samurai, Kambei, has declined to join their cause but saves Kirara from Ukyo's men.
3	"The Entertainer"; Transliteration: "Gojōdan o!" (Japanese: ご冗談を!)	July 10, 2004	April 15, 2006
Kambei decides to help the Kanna trio; he is the one Kirara's dowsing crystal "chose." After the fight with Ukyo's men, the injured Katsushiro and a chastened Kikuchiyo come across Gorobei, a cocky street entertainer. He challenges Katsushiro to play his game of arrows, shooting at his forehead; a former samurai, he catches the arrow just as it nicks his skin.
4	"The Loner"; Transliteration: "Mairu!" (Japanese: 参る!)	July 10, 2004	April 22, 2006
Kambei recruits Gorobei, and they easily dispatch of the assassins sent by Ayamaro, the magistrate. Angered, Ayamaro sends his two bodyguards, fellow samurai, after them. Kambei faces off against the mysterious Kyuzo. They fight until Kambei admits that though he can't defeat Kyuzo now, the fight will have to wait until after a promise is kept.
5	"The Drifter"; Transliteration: "Osomatsu!" (Japanese: お粗末!)	July 24, 2004	April 29, 2006
Kirara and the samurai continue looking for more help. After long days of finding no one, they come across a samurai who chops wood. The samurai, Heihachi, is very skilled with both the sword and machines, but he has never killed a man and prefers eating to violence.
6	"The Fool"; Transliteration: "Makasero!" (Japanese: 任せろ!)	July 24, 2004	May 6, 2006
The Imperial Envoy is murdered in the magistrate's palace, and the samurai are blamed. The magistrate orders all the Samurai and their companions captured – dead or alive. Kambei and the others sneak out of town, staging a daring escape on a runaway train. Kikuchiyo is thought to be dead after a crash.
7	"The Friend"; Transliteration: "Iyasu!" (Japanese: 癒す!)	August 14, 2004	May 13, 2006
With Ukyo hot on their trail, Kambei and the others visit his "old wife", his friend and battle companion, Shichiroji, at an inn in the city of Kougakyo ("Respite"), a lawless sanctuary outside the Magistrate's power. When Ukyo and the hunters track Kikuchiyo there, Shichiroji tells them of a secret passage they can use to escape. He leaves his girlfriend to once again fight at Kambei's side.
8	"The Guardians"; Transliteration: "Ikaru!" (Japanese: 怒る!)	August 14, 2004	May 20, 2006
The group travels to Metal City, the home of the mysterious Guardians (moribito). Katsushiro was injured by one of Ukyo's men, and the group rests with Honoka's, a girl who works for the guardians. But, when the Nobuseri arrive to do business with the Guardians, the samurai decide not to interfere because the Guardians' business is protected by treaty. Rikichi and Kikuchiyo refuse to stand idly by.
9	"The Bandits"; Transliteration: "Mapputatsu!" (Japanese: 真っ二つ!)	August 28, 2004	May 27, 2006
With Kikuchiyo captured by the Nobuseri, Kambei devises a way to rescue the would-be hero. Unfortunately for the remaining samurai, the Nobuseri have laid an ambush for them, with the help of a spy in their midst. Their fighting skills defeat the bandits, with the help of Kyuzo, who kills his former partner Hyogo when his patience runs out and he attempts to do in both Kyuzo and Kambei at once. Kyuzo joins the group, so that he alone will have the honor of fighting Kambei to the death.
10	"The Journey"; Transliteration: "Tsudou!" (Japanese: 集う!)	August 28, 2004	June 3, 2006
With the Nobuseri on their trail, Kambei splits everyone up into three groups. Each group takes a different route to Kanna Village. He takes Kikuchiyo, Katsushiro, and Komachi, while Gorobei, Heihachi, and Rikichi take another route. Shichiroji, Kyuzo, and Kirara take a third route. But Kirara still doesn't fully trust Kyuzo and his intentions. However, she is later proved wrong when Kyuzo saves her life.
11	"The Village"; Transliteration: "Yatte Kita!" (Japanese: やって来た!)	September 11, 2004	June 10, 2006
The samurai arrive at Kanna Village, but find that many of the inhabitants seem to be missing. While Kambei meets with the village elder, Kikuchiyo discovers that the women of the village have gone into hiding along with the rice. He reveals this to the other samurai and they begin the work of preparing the village for the coming battle with the Nobuseri. But a traitor lurks in the village's midst.
12	"The Truth"; Transliteration: "Wameku!" (Japanese: わめく!)	September 11, 2004	June 17, 2006
With the traitor discovered, the samurai are at odds over what should be done with him. Meanwhile, Katsushiro tries to come to terms with his feelings over the first life he has taken. And later, Kikuchiyo reveals a startling secret, making him the 7th and final samurai.
13	"The Attack"; Transliteration: "Utsu!" (Japanese: 撃つ!)	September 25, 2004	June 24, 2006
The battle begins! As the Nobuseri head toward the village, the samurai and farmers make last preparations.
14	"The Offering"; Transliteration: "Abareru!" (Japanese: 暴れる!)	September 25, 2004	July 1, 2006
Ukyo is informed about all the going-ons including that the Nobuseri are having a war in Kanna village. Meanwhile, the samurai continue with their trap to sneak into the enemy's ship.
15	"The Gun and The Calm"; Transliteration: "Zubunure!" (Japanese: ずぶ濡れ!)	October 9, 2004	July 8, 2006
After defeating the Nobuseri's ship, the samurai head back to the village and prepare for their next, even tougher battle with the bandits. As everyone prepares, Heihachi has a heart-to-heart with Katsushiro. Elsewhere, Kambei and Shichiroji do the same.
16	"The Storm"; Transliteration: "Shisu!" (Japanese: 死す!)	October 9, 2004	July 15, 2006
The samurai prepare for the remaining Nobuseri's attack, who are desperate after the loss of their ship. When the attack finally comes, tragedy strikes at the climax. Gorobei tries to deflect a Nobuseri's bullets, but one strikes close enough to engulf Gorobei in a lethal explosion, fatally wounding him. Gorobei later dies from his injuries, leaving the others to mourn his loss.
17	"The Remembrance"; Transliteration: "Karu!" (Japanese: 刈る!)	October 23, 2004	July 22, 2006
With one of the seven dead, and two gone, Katsushiro and Kikuchiyo reflect back at past events and experiences with the group while coming to grips with what they must do next.
18	"The Emperor"; Transliteration: "Moguru!" (Japanese: 潜る!)	October 23, 2004	July 29, 2006
Kambei meets with the Guardians and claims that he killed Amanushi's envoy in Ayamoro's house, which began the samurai round up in the first place, so that they will take him to the capital city. Although he's going there as a prisoner, Kambei is not without a plan to save the women kidnapped by the Nobuseri.
19	"The Mutiny"; Transliteration: "Somuku!" (Japanese: 叛く!)	November 13, 2004	August 5, 2006
While Katsushiro, Kikuchiyo, Kirara, and Komachi plan to save Kambei from the Amanushi, Ukyo is chosen as the successor of Amanushi with a shocking discovery.
20	"The Execution"; Transliteration: "Kigaeru!" (Japanese: 着替える!)	November 13, 2004	August 12, 2006
With Ukyo as the new Amanushi, his plan begins to reveal itself. He places samurai in every village of the empire, ordering them to follow the model of the "Seven of Kanna Village". Meanwhile, he orders the Nobuseri to continue with their raids, but secretly confides to Tessai that he is planning to eliminate them.
21	"The Rescue"; Transliteration: "Tawake!" (Japanese: たわけ!)	November 27, 2004	August 19, 2006
Kambei manages to overpower his executioner in front of the masses, but is quickly deterred from any further action when Ukyo announces that he is pardoning the samurai and freeing the kidnapped women.
22	"The Divide"; Transliteration: "Hippataku!" (Japanese: ひっぱたく!)	November 27, 2004	August 26, 2006
The samurai begin to divide even more, as a samurai leaves the group. Things continue on a bad path, when Ayamaro informs everyone of Ukyo's plan. With five of the samurai gathered together, what will their next plan of action be?
23	"The Lies"; Transliteration: "Usotsuki!" (Japanese: うそつき!)	December 11, 2004	September 2, 2006
Kambei and the others leave Firefly House to begin their war on the capital. They have made many promises up until now, and they each intend to fulfill them. Meanwhile, Katsushiro has some problems when he spots Ukyo's men attempting to burn down Kanna.
24	"The Oaths"; Transliteration: "Chigiru!" (Japanese: 契る!)	December 11, 2004	September 9, 2006
As Katsushiro and the villagers of Kanna prepare for the upcoming battle, Kambei and the others organize a means of reaching the capital.
25	"The Last Battle"; Transliteration: "Ochiru!" (Japanese: 堕ちる!)	December 25, 2004	September 23, 2006
Kambei and the others arrive just in time. After a frontal assault on the capital, the samurai manage to get inside. Meanwhile, Katsushiro and Heihachi work on blowing up the capital.
26	"The Era's End"; Transliteration: "Ueru!" (Japanese: 植える!)	December 25, 2004	September 30, 2006
The final battle has arrived, armed with their swords, spirits and determination the remaining samurai face the finale. But only three samurai make it out alive.
