= Entertain Magazine =

British magazine

Entertain
- Editor: Martin Mason
- Categories: Entertainment
- Frequency: Bimonthly
- First issue: January 2007
- Final issue: October 2010
- Company: Expansive Media
- Country: United Kingdom
- Language: English

Entertain Magazine was a British newsstand magazine devoted to film, DVD, video games and Themed Entertainment. It was published every two months, with the first issue going on sale in January 2007. The publication was notable as the first UK news trade, entertainment magazine to be published on DVD format. During its run, Entertain featured exclusive video features on Transformers: Revenge of the Fallen, Star Trek, The Simpsons Ride at Universal Studios Hollywood, The Wizarding World of Harry Potter at Universal Orlando and Thunderbirds "Stand By for Action".

The magazine ceased publication after 22 issues.
