= The Entertainer (discount publisher) =

- Industry: Discounts and allowances/Classified advertising
- Founded: 2001
- Founder: Donna Benton
- Headquarters: Dubai, United Arab Emirates
- Number of locations: Dubai, Abu Dhabi, Qatar, Bahrain, Oman, Cape Town, Johannesburg, Singapore, London
- Area served: Middle East, Asia, Europe, South Africa
- Key people: Donna Benton, Founder & Chairman
- Number of employees: 300+
- Divisions: The Entertainer Business

The Entertainer is a publisher of buy one get one free (2 for 1) offers for restaurants, leisure attractions, spas, hotel accommodation and more across the Middle East, Asia, Africa and Europe. It was founded in 2001 in Dubai by Donna Benton.

== History ==
The Entertainer was founded by Donna Benton in 2001 in Dubai, United Arab Emirates. Originally from Melbourne, Australia, Benton was 26 when she launched The Entertainer as a “buy one get one free” voucher books provider.

In 2012, Riyada Enterprise Development, an investment platform of Dubai-based investment firm Abraaj Capital, acquired a 50% stake in the company, which marked the start of its “going international and going digital” agenda. Since launching its smartphone app in 2013, The Entertainer shifted fully from a print publication to a data-driven technology company with 38 destination-specific products, and tailored B2B solutions for corporate clients, with offers from over 10,000 merchant partners. The app operates across 20 destinations in 15 countries, and in a variety of languages based on location including English (global), Arabic (GCC), Greek (Athens and Cyprus) and Cantonese (Hong Kong).

In November 2013, the Entertainer launched a smartphone app. In addition to all the offers in the printed books, the App includes more offers added each month, which includes brunches, new restaurant openings and special promotions. Features include GPS mapping, advanced search capabilities allowing you to filter against certain attributes, social sharing and integration with Trip Advisor and Careem.

In 2015, the average Dubai customer saved over AED 6,000 (US$1,600) with the Entertainer App, which has seen over 2 million buy one get one free mobile offers redeemed in the UAE alone.

In July 2018, Bahrain's’ GFH Financial Group announced an investment partnership with Al-Futtaim and Al Zarooni Emirates Investments to complete its acquisition of 85 per cent stake in The Entertainer. The company sold the 85% stake in the company for an undisclosed sum.

== Operations ==
The Entertainer has 46 products (books and apps) that cover 40 destinations across 15 countries.

The Entertainer is privately owned and has offices in the UAE, Qatar, Singapore, Hong Kong, Malaysia, South Africa, Cyprus, Pakistan and the UK.

According to a press statement, The Entertainer contributed $1.3bn to the economy each year, with its profits growing 25-30% annually.

== Businesses ==
The Entertainer launched The Entertainer Business as a new division a few years back. The Entertainer Business is a business loyalty service provider. It has clients across many industries. Banking & Financial Services, Credit Card Issuers, FMCG, Telecommunications Providers, Insurers, Travel Industry, Retailers, Government Agencies and Employee Benefits Programmes.

== See also ==
- Donna Benton
- Abraaj Capital
- GFH Financial Group
