= Tereu Tereu =

American indie band

- Lead singer Ryan Little

Background information
- Origin: Fredericksburg, Virginia / Washington, D.C.
- Genres: Indie rock, pop, post-punk
- Years active: 2006-2015
- Members: Ryan Little; Brendan Polmer
- Past members: Adam Bray; Ross Marshall; Matt Bradshaw; Thomas Orgren
- Website: Official Site

Tereu Tereu was an American indie band based in Washington, DC.

The band began in 2006 as a two-piece group called The Reformation consisting of then Fredericksburg, VA residents Ryan Little and Ross Marshall. Over time, the band expanded in scope, with Fredericksburg native Adam Bray playing bass guitar and Matt Bradshaw on keyboard and trumpet. It adopted the name "Tereu Tereu" from T. S. Eliot's The Waste Land, where it is an allusion to the myth of Philomela. In 2010, the line-up shifted to Brendan Polmer on drums and Thomas Orgren on bass, and the band performed as a three-piece based in Washington, D.C. After opening for The Dismemberment Plan and touring to SXSW with Carol Bui, Orgren left the band to pursue other projects. Tereu Tereu continued as a duo.

Tereu Tereu's music includes elements of D.C. post-punk paired with pop sensibilities. They toured up and down the mid-Atlantic and performed with bands such as Cat Power, Ra Ra Riot, Foals, Jukebox the Ghost, Georgie James, Birdmonster, Maritime, and The Good Life. They self-released an EP in 2007 with help from Travis Morrison, Devin Ocampo, and Jason Caddell. They officially released their first full-length album entitled All That Keeps Us Together on June 16, 2009, and their EP, NW, in March 2011. On September 24, 2013, they released Quadrants, their second album, on Bad Friend Records.
