= Kittens for Christian =

Punk rock band

- Origin: Los Angeles, California, United States
- Genres: Punk rock
- Years active: 1991–2003
- Labels: Dirtbox, Serjical Strike
- Past members: Hiram Fleites; Neil Young; Ed Diffner

Kittens for Christian is a punk rock band that is signed with Serjical Strike Records. They released an album, Privilege of Your Company, on September 9, 2003.

== Band members ==
- Hiram Fleites – bass, vocals
- Neil Young – guitar
- Ed Diffner – drums

== Past members ==
- Fate Fatal — (1991–1993) vocals, The Deep Eynde, A Million Machines

== Discography ==
=== Albums ===
- 1996: Building a Socialist Work Ethic
- 2003: Privilege of Your Company

=== EPs ===
- 2001: Is That What Sex Is Like?

=== Vinyl ===
- 1993: Flowers 7"

=== Cassette ===
- 1992: Bless the Worm Kisses
