= Arthur Grace =

American photographer and photojournalist

- Born: May 7, 1947 (age 79); Massachusetts, United States
- Occupations: Photojournalist, photographer
- Years active: 1972–present

Arthur Grace (born May 7, 1947) is an American photojournalist, documentary photographer, and author whose work spanning fifty years in photography is noted for its in-depth focus on Americana. The author of six books featuring his images, Grace is perhaps best known for his seminal book of black and white photographs of the 1988 U.S. presidential election, Choose Me: Portraits of a Presidential Race. Grace's interest in quintessentially American subjects has resulted in four additional books: Comedians, State Fair, America 101, and Robin Williams: A Singular Portrait. Grace also worked extensively covering life under communism while on assignment for Time and Newsweek behind the Iron Curtain during the Cold War from 1977 to 1989. His most recent book Communism(s): A Cold War Album is a collection of his photographs from that period. During his career in photojournalism, Grace's photographs appeared on the covers of numerous periodicals including Life, Time, Newsweek, Paris Match, and Stern. Grace continues to pursue documentary and personal projects from his home in California.

== Career ==
Arthur Grace began his photography career in 1972 as a freelance photographer for United Press International in Boston. In 1973, he was hired as a staff photographer working out of UPI's Europe, Africa, and Middle East headquarters in Brussels, where he covered elections in Northern Ireland and the Yom Kippur War in addition to the West African drought of the 1970s. Grace returned to Boston in 1974 to freelance as the New England photo correspondent for The New York Times. Among the stories he covered were the protests and violence in Boston following court-ordered busing and desegregation efforts in 1974 and 1975.

Moving to Washington, DC in 1977, he became a contract photographer for Time assigned to the Carter White House. Throughout the next decade, he covered stories in Eastern Europe, the Soviet Union, China, and Mongolia. He also covered the Solidarity movement and martial law in Poland, the U.S. invasion of Grenada, Geraldine Ferraro's vice-presidential campaign, and the 1984 Summer Olympics.

Grace joined Newsweek in 1986 as a staff photographer where he photographed cover stories on Mario Cuomo, Robin Williams, Judge Robert Bork, Michael Dukakis, Pope John Paul II, and drug czar William Bennett. In 1995, he moved to Los Angeles where he concentrated on advertising photography shooting ad campaigns for General Motors and PhRMA, as well as shooting movie posters for major motion picture studios, including Universal Studios, Sony Pictures, Walt Disney Pictures, Warner Brothers, and 20th Century Fox.

During his career, he taught at the Art Center College of Design in Pasadena, California, the Maine Photography Workshops, and also guest lectured at the National Geographic Society and the International Center of Photography. He was also a photography judge for the Robert F. Kennedy Journalism Awards.

== Published work and collections ==
Grace published his first book Choose Me: Portraits of a Presidential Race in 1989, which detailed the 1988 Presidential election cycle through a series of photographs collected while he worked at Newsweek. His second book, Comedians, profiled prominent comedians through a series of intimate photographs and interviews, which was released to positive reviews in 1991. His next work was a profile of state fairs aptly titled State Fairs, which was published in 2006 and featured images culled from his travels around the country. Following advice from Elliott Erwitt who encouraged him to revisit his early work, Grace published America 101 in 2012, which provided "a visual crash course on what Americans are like" according to one critic and was praised by reviewers. His 2016 book Robin Williams: A Singular Portrait, 1986–2002 received positive reviews from critics. It focused singularly on Robin Williams, with whom Grace shared a decades-long friendship and working relationship. In 2022, Grace released his most recent book, Communism(s): A Cold War Album. It received positive coverage in the New York Times, Washington Post, and the Times of London.

In addition to his published work, Grace's photography has appeared in exhibits in Europe and the United States, including solo shows at the International Center of Photography in 1992 and the High Museum of Art in 2012. The National Portrait Gallery has displayed his photographs of comedian George Carlin on its Recognize Wall and Senator Bob Dole in its exhibition The Struggle for Justice. In 2026, Grace’s photographs of a miner’s strike in West Virginia in 1977 were exhibited in a major retrospective show at the National Gallery of Art titled Beneath the Surface: Mining and American Photography. His work is in the permanent collections at the J. Paul Getty Museum, the National Portrait Gallery, the International Center of Photography, the High Museum of Art, the Minneapolis Institute of Art and the National Museum of American History, among others. In 2006, he donated his color photojournalism archives to the Briscoe Center for American History at the University of Texas at Austin.

== Books ==
- Choose Me: Portraits of a Presidential Race – 1989
- Comedians – 1991
- State Fair – 2006
- America 101 – 2012
- Robin Williams: A Singular Portrait, 1986–2002 – 2016
- Communism(s): A Cold War Album – 2022
