= James B. Grace =

American ecologist (born 1951)

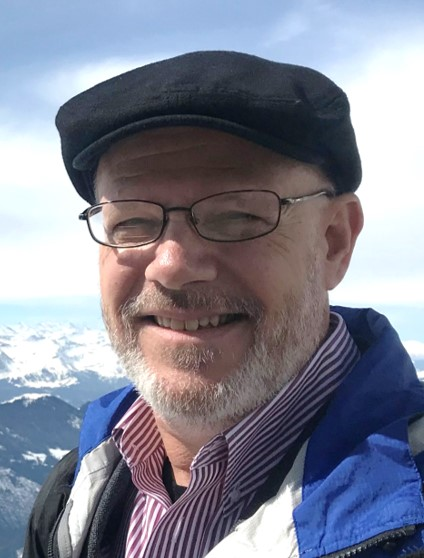
- Born: James Benjamin Grace
- Education: Presbyterian College Clemson University Michigan State University
- Awards: Meritorious Research Award from the Society of Wetland Scientists (2000) Fellow of the Ecological Society of America (2014) Highly Cited Researcher – Web of Science (2019, 2020) Presidential Rank Award Winner (2021)
- Scientific career
- Workplaces: U.S. Geological Survey Louisiana State University University of Arkansas
- Thesis: Phenotypic and Genotypic Components of Growth and Reproduction in Typha latifolia (1980)
- Website: https://www.usgs.gov/staff-profiles/james-grace?qt-staff_profile_science_products=0#qt-staff_profile_science_products

James Benjamin Grace (born October 6, 1951) is a senior research scientist with the U.S. Geological Survey. Formerly, he was a professor at Louisiana State University and an associate professor at the University of Arkansas. He is an ecologist whose work has focused on science methodology, most notably the development of a new, expanded paradigm and set of procedures for causal investigations.

== Early life and education ==
Grace grew up in the Appalachian Mountains near Matewan, West Virginia, until he was 13 years old. He attended Riverside Military Academy in Gainesville, Georgia, from the 8th to 12th grades before attending Presbyterian College in Clinton South Carolina, for his undergraduate studies. During his Master of Science work at Clemson University, he received an Oak Ridge National Fellowship to conduct research at the Savannah River National Laboratory. During his PhD studies at Michigan State University, he was supported by the Department of Energy while conducting research at the W.K. Kellogg Biological Station.

== Research and career ==
Grace is an ecologist known for his work in science methodology, especially integrative methods for quantitative analysis. His early work focused on species interactions, leading to his first book project (Perspectives on Plant Competition, Grace and Tilman 1990), which resolved a major controversy about competitive strategies. This later led Grace to introduce meta-modeling to the field of statistical ecology as a means of operationalizing multi-dimensional concepts.

The second phase of Grace’s career focused on exploring and promoting the utility of causal networks as a framework for integrative analysis (as discussed in his 2003 book Analysis of Ecological Communities and his 2006 book, Structural Equation Modeling and Natural Systems). His applications of these methods have spanned the range from wetlands to deserts, from the arctic to the tropics, from trophic cascades to the design of cities, and have included the effects of fires, hurricanes, and climate change. Pursuit of a reconciliation of competing theories related to productivity-diversity interrelations led Grace and collaborators to the resolution of a 40-year debate through the testing of integrative hypotheses (Grace et al. 2016 Nature).

In 2024, Grace developed a new science paradigm that expands the evidence that can support causal interpretations, and in the process, resolves a 120-year debate related to causal methods (Grace 2024). This new paradigm replaces the popular “Causal Inference Paradigm” from statistics with an “Integrative Causal Investigation Paradigm” that incorporates results from mechanistic, statistical, and dynamic studies, showing how to build transportable causal knowledge.

== Awards and honors ==
As of 2020, Grace has given over 200 invited lectures and workshops in 9 countries during his career. In 2000, he received the Millennium Meritorious Research Award from the Society of Wetland Scientists, and in 2003 received the National Science Excellence Award from the U.S. Geological Survey. He was selected to be a Fellow of the Ecological Society of America and promoted to the USGS Senior Scientist ranks in 2014. He was selected as a Distinguished Ecologist by Colorado State University’s Graduate Program in Ecology in 2019. In 2021, he received the Presidential Rank Award, which is given out by the president of the United States and is the highest honor given to career senior scientists or other executives for their duties. He has achieved the designation of ‘Highly-Cited Researcher’ by the Web of Science in recognition of the scientific impact of his work. He has published over 200 papers and reports, including 3 books, one on competitive interactions, one on community analysis, and one on structural equation modeling. His publications have received several awards and been featured in news articles numerous times. His 2016 paper in Nature was among the top science stories of the year, featured in 12 science news articles, 9 blog articles, and highlighted in Nature Magazine.
