= That's Entertainment =

That's Entertainment may refer to:

== Music ==
- That's Entertainment (album), 2000 recording by the Japanese group Cymbals
- That's Entertainment (musical), 1972 musical revue
- "That's Entertainment" (The Jam song), 1980 recording from the album Sound Affects
- That's Entertainment!, 1974 retrospective celebrating the films of Metro-Goldwyn-Mayer
  - That's Entertainment, Part II, 1976 sequel to That's Entertainment!
  - That's Entertainment! Part III, 1994 sequel to That's Entertainment!
- That's Entertainment! (album), 1960 recording by Judy Garland
- "That's Entertainment!" (song), from the 1953 musical film The Band Wagon

== Television ==
=== Series ===
- That's Entertainment (Emirati TV program), weekly celebrity gossip show launched in 2011
- That's Entertainment (Philippine TV program), Philippine teen variety show broadcast from 1986 to 1996

=== Episodes ===
- "That's Entertainment", a 1982 episode of Laverne & Shirley
- "That's Entertainment", a 1983 episode of Condo
- "That's Entertainment", a 1999 episode of Webster
- "That's Entertainment", a 1990 episode of G.I. Joe: A Real American Hero (1989)
- "That's Entertainment", a 1992 episode of Rab C. Nesbitt
- "That's Entertainment", a 1996 episode of Harry's Mad
- "That's Entertainment", a 1999 episode of Spin City
- "That's Entertainment", a 2000 episode of Operation Good Guys
- "That's Entertainment!" (Johnny Bravo), a 2004 episode of Johnny Bravo
- "That's Entertainment" (Gotham), a 2018 episode of Gotham
- "That's Entertainment" (Hazbin Hotel), a 2019 episode of Hazbin Hotel

== Other ==
- That's Entertainment (comic shop), founded in 1980 in Worcester, Massachusetts, U.S.
