= The Jane Bradfords =

Irish indie rock band

- Origin: Belfast, Northern Ireland
- Genres: Indie
- Years active: 2006–present
- Labels: Simple Tapestry
- Members: Deci Gallen; Ted Caldwell; Johnny Farry; Paul McAdams
- Past members: Dave Frecknall
- Website: thejanebradfords.com

The Jane Bradfords are an indie band from Northern Ireland that have drawn comparisons to Echo and the Bunnymen, New Order and The National.

== Career ==
Originally a solo project by Castlederg musician Deci Gallen, they became a full band in 2006 when Ted Caldwell (drums), Johnny Farry (bass/guitar) and David Frecknall (bass/guitar) joined with Gallen on lead vocals and guitar. Since 2009, the live show has been complemented by extra musicians including Katie Richardson, Stuart Bell and Ruari Dempsey. Paul McAdams joined in 2009.

The band were named after the lead character in the 1930s B-movie The Pace That Kills and reference the film in some songs.

They have been championed on BBC Radio 1 by Huw Stephens and Colin Murray. They performed a Maida Vale live session for Radio 1 in January 2007. The group have played support to Maxïmo Park, Cold War Kids, The National, Peter Bjorn and John, LCD Soundsystem, CSS and DeVotchka.

In early 2010 their music was used in advertising campaigns by Harp Lager and by Five for their Season 4 Grey's Anatomy trailer. In early 2011 their song "Strategy #2 (Fight Them All)" was used on trailers for The Mentalist as well as by Liverpool Football Club on their TV station LFC TV. In April 2011 BT launched a brand new advertising campaign using an unreleased song by the band called 'Better Place.'

== Chart success ==
The Jane Bradfords made the UK national news in November 2006 when, despite being unsigned, their debut single "Hide From the Cold" got to number 1 in the QBS Alternative Rock Top 40 charts, on QBS Radio in the Middle Eastern country Qatar, remaining there for two weeks.

== Other projects ==
Deci Gallen currently releases music under the name LMINL.

== Discography ==
=== Albums ===
- The Jane Bradfords (April 2008)
- 100 Miles of Broken Pavement (Feb 2012)

=== Singles ===
- "Hide From the Cold EP" (2007)
- "The Evening Angels Gather Here" (2008)
- "Too Much Christmas" (2009)
- "Judicial Duel" (2010)
- "Tonight the World is Always Ending" (2011)

=== Live Sessions ===
- Huw Stephens, Radio 1 (2007)
- Stephen McCauley, BBC Radio Foyle (2007)
- ATL, BBC Radio Ulster (2008)
- Bandwidth Videoblog (2009)
