= My Favorite =

American indie pop band

- Origin: Long Island, New York
- Genres: Rock, pop, new wave, alternative, indie
- Years active: 1991–2005, 2014–present
- Labels: Swing Set Records, Harriet Records, A Turntable Friend, Double Agent, Hungry Audio, Where It's At Is Where You Are, Death Party Records
- Members: Michael Grace Jr. Gil Abad; Kurt Brondo; Jaime Babic; Joseph Babic
- Past members: Captain Kirk Douglas; Darren Amadio; Andrea Vaughn; Todd "Todbot" Karasik

My Favorite are an indie pop band formed in Long Island, New York in 1991, later of Brooklyn and Queens. After releasing two full-length albums, the original band split in 2005, but reformed in 2014.

== Formation and original era ==
My Favorite formed on Long Island in 1991, and eventually migrated to the New York City boroughs of Brooklyn and Queens. The "classic" lineup consisted of founder and principal songwriter Michael Grace Jr., vocalist Andrea Vaughn, guitarist Darren Amadio, bassist Gil Abad and drummer Todd "Todbot" Karasik. An even earlier incarnation featured Amadio on bass and current Roots member Captain Kirk Douglas on guitar (two tracks featuring Douglas were included on the 2014 reissue/compilation Love at Absolute Zero/Death in Suburbia).

Their main influences included Orchestral Manoeuvres in the Dark, New Order, The Cure and the Smiths, and various singles from influential labels like Factory, Rough Trade, Cherry Red and Sarah. In negotiating these influences and impulses, they were contemporaries of Magnetic Fields and Belle and Sebastian, two bands they performed alongside in New York.

The band released two full-length albums (Love at Absolute Zero and The Happiest Days of Our Lives: The Complete Joan of Arc Tapes), and several EPs and limited-edition, vinyl-only singles. They also made two music videos.

Late in their original career, My Favorite found popularity in Sweden, where they were the focus of a feature on that country's national Sveriges Radio. They performed at three influential festivals and had many smaller, but enthusiastically received performances in cities like Gothenburg and Stockholm.

== Reception ==
My Favorite were frequently discussed in the indie music press of the time in the context of new wave retroism, but were more accurately thought of in the tradition of romantic, lyric-driven post-rock and roll melancholia, strands of which originated with artists like the Velvet Underground and certain glam rock artists before reaching their apex in the post-punk period. They were featured in the Village Voice, New York Post, Daily News and Alternative Press, and were interviewed on indie programs such as New York Noise.

== Breakup ==
My Favorite broke up on September 14, 2005, when Vaughn left the band.

== Other projects ==
In 2006, the remaining five members of My Favorite joined forces with vocalists Lisa Ronson (daughter of David Bowie guitarist Mick Ronson) and Erin Dermody to form a new band called the Secret History.

Karasik also played for New York post-punk band Bell Hollow from 2006 until their 2008 split, and appeared on their 2007 album Foxgloves (which also featured My Favorite singer Vaughn on backing vocals).

Vaughn recorded vocals for the French band Bagatelle's debut EP, Rendez-Vous Transatlantique, formed by Jérôme Mériaux, Olivier Blot and Nicolas Dufournet, which was released in 2013 by La Nageuse Records.

In 2014, Vaughn, Amadio and Karasik reunited to form the Chandler Estate with long-time friends and collaborators Tara Emelye Needham (Mad Planets, the Reverse) and Bryce Edwards (Boycrazy). In 2015, they played their first show at the NYC Popfest and released four-song EP Infrastructure on Jigsaw Records.

== Reformation ==
In 2014, Grace reassembled My Favorite (minus Vaughn) to perform at the NYC Popfest. On October 7, 2014, they released their first new single in 10 years, "Second Empire"/"Dance With a Stranger", on London's Where It's At Is Where You Are label. The current incarnation, relying more heavily on drum machines and sequencers, includes Grace, Abad and Brondo, with Jaime Babic and Joseph Babic replacing Vaughn and Amadio, respectively. In 2022 they released the new EP "Tender Is The Nightshift: Part 1", the first three-part series.

== Discography ==
=== Studio albums ===
- Love at Absolute Zero CD (1999, Double Agent)
- The Happiest Days of Our Lives: The Complete Joan of Arc Tapes 2CD (2003, Double Agent)

=== Singles and EPs ===
- Brighton Riot cassette EP (1992, self-released)
- The Last New Wave Record 7-inch EP (1994, Swing Set Records)
- "Working Class Jacket" split 7-inch single with Mad Planets (1995, Harriet Records)
- The Informers & Us 7-inch EP (1995, Harriet)
- "Modulate" split 7-inch single with Boyracer (1996, A Turntable Friend)
- Joan of Arc Awaiting Trial CD EP (2000, Double Agent)
- A Cult of One CD EP (2001, Double Agent)
- The Kids Are All Wrong CD EP (2002, Double Agent)
- "The Happiest Days of My Life" CD single (2005, Hungry Audio)
- Intercontinental Pop Exchange No. 7 split CD EP with Entre Rios (2005, Endearing Records)
- "Second Empire"/"Dance With a Stranger" 7-inch single (2014, Where It's At Is Where You Are)
- "Christine Zero" 7-inch single (2016, Death Party Records)
- Tender Is the Nightshift: Part 1 12-inch EP (2022, Happy Happy Birthday to Me records, Where It's At Is Where You Are)

=== Compilation albums ===
- My Favorite promo CD (2004, Media Creature Music)
- Love at Absolute Zero/The Happiest Days of Our Lives LP (2014, Cloudberry Records/La Kalsa)
