= The Secret History (band) =

American band

- Origin: New York City
- Genres: Rock; pop; new wave; alternative rock; indie rock
- Years active: 2006–2013
- Label: Le Grand Magistery
- Past members: Michael Grace Jr.; Lisa Ronson; Darren Amadio; Gil Abad; Kurt Brondo; Todd Karasik; Erin Dermody; Jaime Allison Babic
- Website: thesecrethistory.net

The Secret History was a New York-based indie pop/art rock group, formed in 2006 by songwriter Michael Grace Jr. and four other members from his previous group My Favorite (bassist Gilbert Abad, drummer Todd Karasik, guitarist Darren Amadio and keyboardist Kurt Brondo), alongside vocalist Lisa Ronson (daughter of Mick Ronson).

== History ==
The Secret History's first release was the Desolation Town EP in 2008, on the indie label Le Grand Magistery.

The band's debut album, 2010's The World That Never Was (Le Grand Magistery), was a critical success, landing on best-of lists from AllMusic, Spectrum Culture and public radio station KEXP (in addition to cracking the CMJ Top 200 for college radio airplay overall.) It was also listed among the best records of the year by Kip Berman of the Pains of Being Pure at Heart in NME.

A video for "Johnny Anorak", directed by Ben Hughes, featured Jed Smith of the band My Teenage Stride in the title role.

Vocalist Jaime Allison Babic joined in time for the Secret History's second album, Americans Singing in the Dark, which was self-released in June 2013.

In 2014, Grace reassembled My Favorite with Abad, Babic and Brondo, putting the Secret History on indefinite hiatus.

== Other projects ==
Drummer Todd Karasik also played for New York post-punk band Bell Hollow from 2006 until their 2008 split, and appeared on their 2007 album Foxgloves.

In 2014, Amadio and Karasik formed the Chandler Estate with My Favorite singer Andrea Vaughn and collaborators Tara Emelye Needham (Mad Planets, the Reverse) and Bryce Edwards (Boycrazy). In 2015, they played their first show at the NYC Popfest and released four-song EP Infrastructure on Jigsaw Records.

== Discography ==
=== Studio albums ===
- The World That Never Was (2010, Le Grand Magistery)
- Americans Singing in the Dark (2013, self-released)

=== EPs ===
- Desolation Town EP (2008, Le Grand Magistery)
