= Made in Japan (band) =

- Origin: Sydney, New South Wales, Australia
- Genres: Indie rock, Post-punk revival, Dream pop
- Years active: 2009–2014
- Members: James Cooney; Jono Graham; Tom Davis; Andrew Knox
- Website: madeinjapan.net.au

Made in Japan were an Australian indie rock band formed in 2009 by James Cooney on vocals and drums, Tom Davis on guitar, Jono Graham on guitar and Andrew Knox on bass guitar. Their sound was self-described as "dream-pop" and "groove based." It evolved from straightforward post-punk revival in their early releases to incorporate an ethereal shoegaze aesthetic. They released two studio albums, Sights and Sounds (February 2012) and Tame All Those Thoughts (November 2013), before disbanding in 2014.

== History ==
The band were formed by schoolmates James Cooney (vocals/drums) and Jono Graham (guitar) in 2009 over their mutual appreciation for the Bloc Party album Silent Alarm. Tom Davis (guitar) and Andrew Knox (bass guitar) soon joined the band, and new material was composed.

In February 2009, the band released an eponymous four-track EP. In October of the same year, their first single "Oxford Decor" was released. The band then recorded and released the single "Pairs" in April 2010. Both "Oxford Decor" and "Pairs" received late-night music television attention, and the band was featured on Australian radio station Triple J.

Their first full-length album Sights and Sounds was released in February 2012. The album included "Pairs" and a re-recorded version of a track from their debut EP, titled "Evening Weather." The album was shortlisted for the 2012 Australian Music Prize. The band began to tour, including playing at The Great Escape Festival in the UK in May 2013.

Shortly after posting the singles "Follow the Fool" and "History" (of which a video was released) to their SoundCloud profile, the band released their second full-length album on 1 November 2013, titled Tame All Those Thoughts (based on a lyric from "History").

On 23 April 2014, an announcement was made on their Facebook page that they would be entering an indefinite hiatus after member Tom Davis accepted a job in animation in Canada.

== Discography ==
=== Albums ===
- Sights and Sounds - Independently released (17 February 2012)
- Tame All Those Thoughts - Independently released (1 November 2013)

=== EPs ===
- Made in Japan - Independently released (20 February 2009)

=== Singles ===
- "Oxford Decor" - Independently released (2 October 2009)
- "Pairs" - Independently released (6 April 2010)
- "Follow the Fool" - Independently released (16 July 2013)
- "History" - Independently released (19 October 2013)
