= InLiquid =

American nonprofit organization

InLiquid is a 501(c)(3) nonprofit member-based organization that provides free resources for the Philadelphia area arts community and serves to connect artists with curators, collectors, and the general public. Its website includes a local arts events calendar, employment, grant, and exhibition opportunities listings, as well as directories of arts publications, galleries, arts centers, and educational institutions.

== History ==
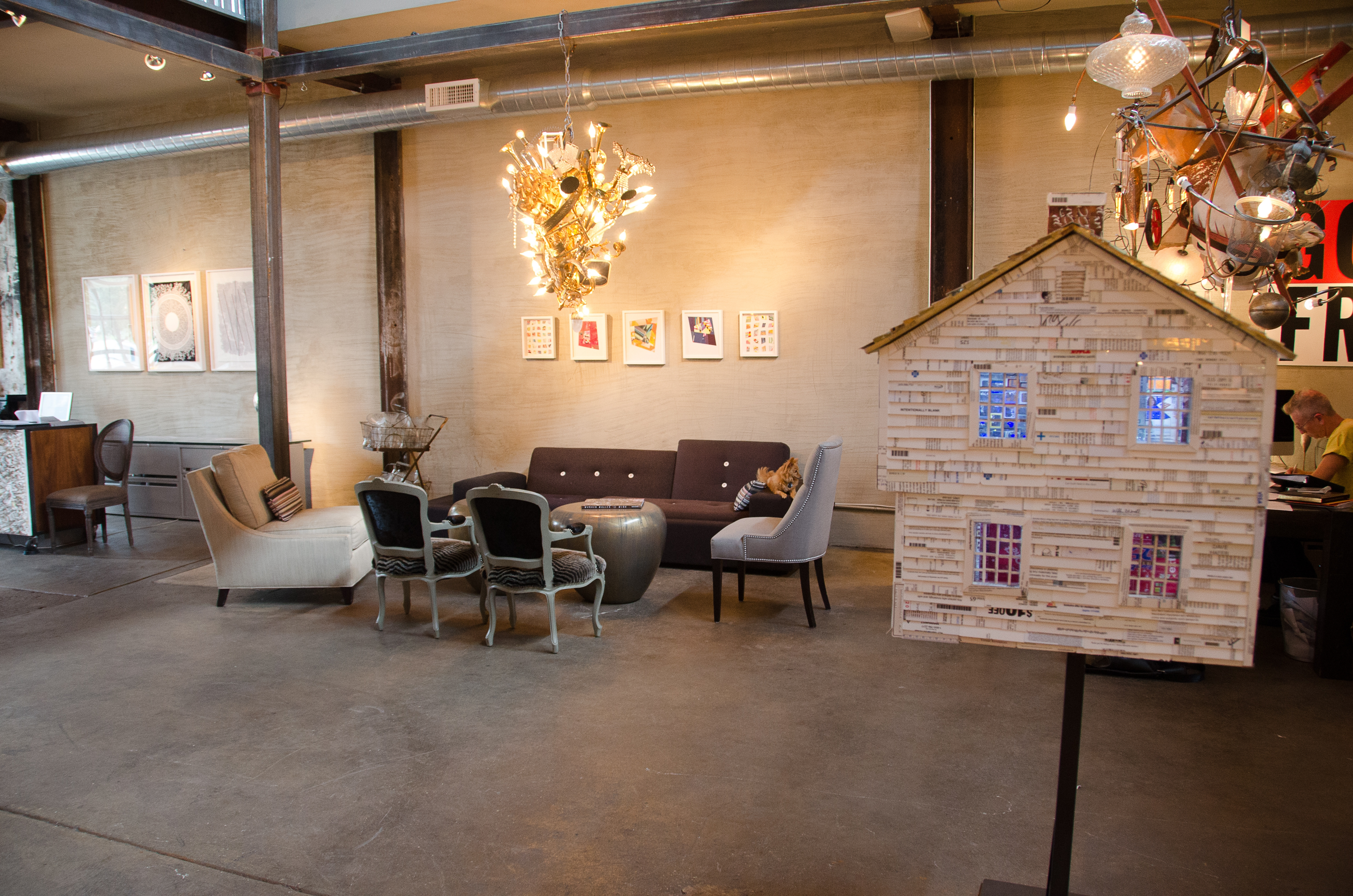
Installation shot of Current/Approaching exhibition at bahdeebahdu, in celebration of InLiquid's 15th anniversary

Founded in 1999 by photographer Rachel Zimmerman, InLiquid started at the artist's home in the Old City neighborhood of Philadelphia. Zimmerman, a graduate from New York University, worked to draw art collectors to Philadelphia and allow the local creative community greater visibility, with the goal of creating a sustainable arts economy.

Through hosting dialogues and exhibition series, InLiquid was an early contributor to the rejuvenation of the city’s arts scene. Today the website hosts hundreds of artist portfolios, including recognizable names like photographer Zoe Strauss, founder of the Philadelphia Public Art Project, and the artwork of internationally known jewelry designer John Wind, whose collections have been featured in O Magazine and Elle.

=== Location ===
The organization has offices in the Crane Arts building, a warehouse-turned-art space originally built in 1906, and located at 1400 N. American Street in the Kensington neighborhood of Philadelphia. Year-round member exhibitions are held in neighborhoods throughout the city and the surrounding region. Regular InLiquid exhibition spaces include Park Towne Place and The National Old City Apartments. Past InLiquid exhibition spaces include the Painted Bride Art Center in Old City, International House Philadelphia in University City, and the Sundance TV offices in New York. Past partnerships have included Gallery 543 at URBN Headquarters, the Leonard Pearlstein Gallery at Drexel University, project space de, Feast Your Eye’s Salon at Front+Palmer, Marriott Courtyard at the Philadelphia Naval Shipyard, Carpenter Square, minima, Bryn Mawr Film Institute, West Elm], the digital cube at the Kimmel Center for the Performing Arts, the media wall at Commerce Square, Spruce Street Harbor Park, James Oliver Gallery, Select Fair Miami, Select Fair New York, River's Edge Gallery at Bridgeton House, Engagement Studios, bahdeebahdu, and Old City Publishing.

== Programming ==
Other programming for the organization centers around two yearly events: the Benefit and Art for the Cash Poor. The Benefit and Silent Auction, held every February in the Crane Arts space, serves as a showcase for emerging and established visual artists as well as a fundraiser for InLiquid, with part of the proceeds going back to the artists themselves. Art for the Cash Poor, a block-party style art sale, acts as its more affordable summer counterpart every June, with all artwork priced under $200 and a goal of fostering a new audience of art collectors.

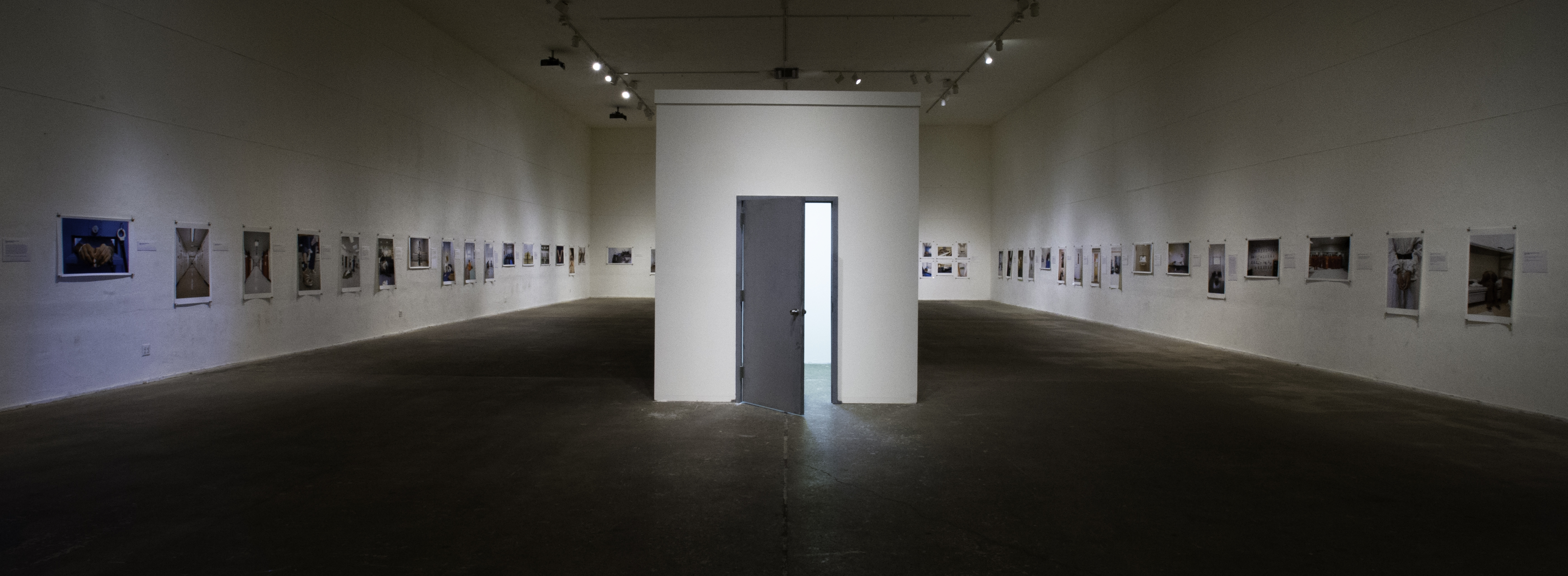
Installation shot of the Juvenile In Justice exhibition, featuring photography by Richard Ross and curated by InLiquid, at Crane Arts in Philadelphia

In 2013, InLiquid expanded its regular arts programming to include more community driven events and exhibitions, beginning with its Juvenile In Justice project. Juvenile In Justice was an exhibition of works by the internationally renowned photographer Richard Ross, and Philadelphia artists Roberto Lugo and Mat Tomezsko, presented at Crane Arts from November 8 through December 12, 2013. This exhibition, accompanied by extensive public programming, participated in a national conversation about the U.S. juvenile justice system and how communities, with a focus on Philadelphia, can better engage and provide critical support to youth. Juvenile In Justice won the 2014 PNC Arts Alive Award for Innovation in Honor of Peggy Amsterdam (Arts & Business Council of Greater Philadelphia) and is continuing through InLiquid’s Art For Action series.
