= Billy Grace =

Australian rules footballer

Personal information
- Full name: William George Grace
- Born: 8 July 1876; Richmond, Victoria
- Died: 23 June 1938 (aged 61); Essendon, Victoria
- Original team: Fitzroy Crescent

Playing career^{1}
Years	Club	Games (Goals)
1900	Essendon	4 (1)
- ^{1} Playing statistics correct to the end of 1900.

William George Grace (8 July 1876 – 23 June 1938) was an Australian rules footballer who played with Essendon in the Victorian Football League (VFL).

== Family ==
The son of Thomas Grace, and Julia Grace, née O'Callaghan, William George Grace was born in Richmond, Victoria on 8 July 1876. He was the younger brother of Fitzroy footballers Jim Grace and Mick Grace.

Grace married Ethel Violet Moore in 1906 and he died at his home, in Essendon, Victoria on 23 June 1938.
