= Those Manic Seas =

American indie rock band

- Origin: Richmond, Virginia, United States
- Genres: Indie rock, post-punk, post-rock, alternative rock,dream pop
- Years active: 2010–present
- Members: Daniel Medley; Justin Jones; Drew Rollo; Kilroy
- Past members: Curtis Park
- Website: www.thosemanicseas.com

Those Manic Seas were an indie rock band based in Richmond, Virginia, known for their unique 'lead-singer' and interactive live performances.'

The band's music was composed and performed by Medley (drums), Jones (keys, theremin) and Rollo (guitar, synths, piano), while the lyrics were written and sung by “Kilroy” — an android, by all intents and purposes, comprising the body of a mannequin with a functional TV for a head.
Those Manic Seas' sound would evolve from a dark, lo-fi, dance-punk into a heavily lush and semi-orchestrated post-rock, with an aptitude for melodious experimentation and theatrical stage performances. The instrumentation consisted of vocals, electric guitar, keyboards/synths, drums and an array of other instruments including piano, horns, strings, and electronic elements.

== History ==
=== Early history (Headache/Heartache EP) (2010–2013) ===
Initially, Those Manic Seas began as a project by drummer Daniel Medley in early 2010. Shortly after the band wrote their first release, 'Headache/Heartache'. The EP featured two tracks, 'Headache/Heartache' and 'That Manic Song' which were both recorded in December, 2012 at Sound of Music Studio's in Richmond, with engineer and producer Alan Weatherhead. A 7" of the EP was released in May 2013. The band subsequently toured the East Coast in support of the EP.

=== (2014–present) ===
In the spring of 2015 the band embarked on their second East Coast tour. They performed at notable venues such as The National Theater for XL102's Discovery Series and The Basement in Nashville, TN. After returning home, they began recording a full-length album with John Morand at Sound of Music Studio. which has a tentative release date of May 2015.

== Discography ==
=== EPs ===
- Headache/Heartache 7" (2013)
- Outlier- Single (2015)

=== Music videos ===
| Year | Video | Director |
|---|---|---|
| 2013 | "Headache/Heartache" | Joey Schihl |
| 2015 | "That Manic Song" | Shannon Roulet |
| 2015 | "Outlier" | Shannon Roulet |
