= The Prids =

American post-punk/indie rock band

- Origin: Portland, Oregon
- Genres: Post-punk; indie rock; noise pop; shoegaze
- Years active: 1995–present
- Labels: Death Tech Music, Luminal Records, Five03 Records, This-A-Way, Velvet Blue Music
- Members: David Frederickson; Mistina La Fave; Geordie Thompson; Cass Yates
- Past members: Trenor Rapkins; Jairus Smith; Lee Zeman; Eric Hold; Molly Griffith; Joey Maas; Maile Arruda; Gordon Nickel
- Website: theprids.com

The Prids are an American post-punk/indie rock band based in Portland, Oregon, led by former couple David Frederickson and Mistina La Fave. AllMusic described them as specializing in "a moody form of indie rock influenced by '80s college radio stalwarts",. and their influences include the Smiths, Unrest, the Jesus and Mary Chain, Built to Spill, Wire and Sonic Youth.

The Prids are known for following a strong DIY ethic, including the home recording of several of their records, booking their own tours and running their own Portland label collective, This-A-Way Records.

== History ==
The Prids were founded in the small town of St. Joseph, Missouri, in 1995 by Frederickson (guitar, vocals) and La Fave (bass, vocals).

Frederickson moved to St. Joseph from Riverside, California after meeting a friend in rehab, with whom he'd started writing his first songs. He soon met La Fave, who attended one of his early shows. They eventually struck up a romance and formed The Prids soon after. The band name was a reference to a pet name that Frederickson had for La Fave. The group continued to develop in Omaha and Lincoln, Nebraska, and in Lincoln, they befriended Harry Dingman III, guitarist of 1980s post-punk band For Against.

The band relocated to Portland in November 1999 over their mutual love of the band Team Dresch, and released their debut EP, Duracraft, in 2000 on the Death Tech Music label, featuring cover artwork by Dingman. In a contemporaneous live review, the Portland Mercury described the Prids as: "Imagine if My Bloody Valentine and New Order decided to collaborate when they were both at their peaks".

The Prids have performed with the likes of TV On the Radio, The Faint and Franz Ferdinand. Deerhunter played their first-ever show opening for The Prids in Atlanta, Georgia. The Prids played one of their earliest shows at the legendary Satyricon.

Their second EP, Glide, Screamer, was self-released in 2002, and The Prids released their debut full-length album, Love Zero, on May 6, 2003, on Luminal Records. The band went on to release two 7-inch singles on Luminal: "Let It Go" and "Shadow and Shadow.”

The Prids signed with New York-based label Five03 Records, and released a second album, ...Until the World Is Beautiful (August 29, 2006) and a third EP, Something Difficult (October 9, 2007).

On July 20, 2008, the Prids were involved in a serious highway accident while driving south from San Francisco to Los Angeles. All four members and two of their significant others were injured to varying degrees, and their van and gear were destroyed. In the aftermath of the accident, fans and friends worldwide donated over $16,000 to help the band with medical bills and equipment costs, and Five03 released a digital-only benefit/tribute album, Dots to Connect: The Music of the Prids, featuring Prids covers by A Place to Bury Strangers, the Suffocation Keep (with Brett Nelson of Built to Spill), The Upsidedown, Entertainment, Helvetia (band) and others.

In 2009, the Prids issued the song "Break" on a split single with Lookbook. The band's third album, Chronosynclastic, featuring guest appearances from Doug Martsch of Built to Spill and Jason Albertini of Duster, was released on the Velvet Blue Music label on June 11, 2010.

In 2015, the Prids celebrated their 20th anniversary as a band, and in 2018 they released their fourth album, Do I Look Like I’m In Love? produced by Sean Flora (The Shins, Stephen Malkmus and the Jicks, The Black Keys).

The Prids will release their fifth full-length album I Only Care About You and Me on Sept. 7, 2024, on This-A-Way Records. The album was produced by Larry Crane, and will include the first single, “Tell You Nothing.”

== Members ==
- David Frederickson - guitar, vocals (1995–present)
- Mistina La Fave - bass, vocals (1995–present)
- Geordie Thompson - drums (2019–present)
- Cass Yates - keyboards, bass (2014–present)

=== Former members ===
- Trenor Rapki - keyboards (1998–2001)
- Jairus Smith - drums, keyboards (1998–2004)
- Lee Zeman - drums (2002–2005, 2009–2015)
- Eric Hold - keyboards (2004–2007)
- Joey Maas - drums (2005- 2009)
- Maile Arruda - keyboards (2007–2015)
- Gordon Nickel - drums (2015–2019)

== Discography ==
=== Studio albums ===
- Love Zero (2003, Luminal Records; 2006, This-A-Way Records)
- ...Until the World Is Beautiful (2006, Five03 Records)
- Chronosynclastic (2010, Velvet Blue Music; 2011, This-A-Way Records)
- Do I Look Like I'm In Love? (2018, This-A-Way Records)
- I Only Care About You and Me (2024, This-A-Way Records)

=== EPs ===
- Duracraft (2000, Death Tech Music)
- Glide, Screamer (2002, self-released)
- Something Difficult (2007, Five03 Records)

=== Singles ===
- "Let It Go" 7-inch (2004, Luminal Records)
- "Shadow and Shadow" 7-inch (2004, Luminal Records)
- "Something Difficult" 7-inch (2008, Catastrophe Ballet)
- "Break" split 7-inch with Lookbook (2009, Poison Apple Records)

=== Compilation appearances ===
- "Persona Solara" on Portland Mercury Presents Compact Disc of Sound (2001, Portland Mercury)
- "Contact" on New Dark Age Vol. 2 (2004, Strobelight Records)
- "The Problem" on Dark Awakening Vol. 5 (2006, COP International)
- "One Thousand Five" on A Compilation of Portland Music Volume 5 (2008, Failing Records)
- "Fragile" on Songs From a Sonic Land (2010, Reverb Records)
- "I'm Sorry" on Friends and Acquaintances (2013, Cassingle and Loving It)
- "Lie Here" on "Portland Cream Vol.1" (2016, Voodoo Doughnut Recordings)
- "Adore" on Got That Feeling, a Tribute to Skywave (2015, The Blog That Celebrates Itself Records)

=== Tribute albums ===
- Dots to Connect: The Music of the Prids (2009, Five03 Records)
