= Entertainment (band) =

- Origin: Athens, Georgia, U.S.
- Genres: Post-punk; gothic rock; deathrock; indie rock
- Years active: 2002–present
- Labels: Stickfigure Records, Luminal Records, Simulacre/aDistant, Duchess Archive
- Members: Trey Ehart; Jennifer von Schlichten; Jim Groff; Henry Jack Buxbaum; Bari Donovan Watts
- Past members: Andrew Gleason; Todd Caras; Chisolm Thompson; Spencer McGhin

Entertainment is an American post-punk band founded in 2002 in Athens, Georgia.

== History ==
Entertainment formed in 2002 in Athens, Georgia, influenced by the Doors, Love, Led Zeppelin, Bauhaus, Public Image Ltd, the Cure, Gang of Four, Christian Death, Joy Division, the Birthday Party, dub and krautrock.

After the December 2003 release of their first single "Safe at One" on Atlanta label Stickfigure Records, the band was signed by now-defunct Luminal Records, who released their second single, "Patroness", in 2004. A split 12-inch EP release with Canadian band A Spectre Is Haunting Europe followed in 2006 on Simulacre Media/Adistant Sound.

Entertainment's debut album, Gender, was released in 2008 by Stickfigure, with a remastered vinyl version issued the following year on New York label Duchess Archive. It received extensive critical acclaim and was voted the 2008 deathrock album of the year by Deathrock.com., who said, "Entertainment take [the] dark, post-punk, gothic concept back to the drawing board, removing the complication and dispensing with the miserable pop-sensibilities of the latest crop of 'post-punk' bandwagoners over the past half decade. What they achieve with surrealistic, visually descriptive lyrics, and the opium-den like pace is ultimately parallel to none other than Only Theatre of Pain, oddly enough". In a 2009 live review for Shadowtime NYC, Big Takeover critic Kristin Sollee described Entertainment as: "A slow burn of anarchic pleasures moving between pounding, tribal vigor and creeping, Gothic slither, few bands can make music this cold and abyssal so fiery and enticing".

In 2016, the band toured the United States as support for Modern English.

== Members ==
- Trey Ehart - vocals, keyboards, guitar
- Jennifer von Schlichten - bass
- Henry Jack Buxbaum - guitar
- Jim Groff - synth
- Bari Donavan Watts - drums, percussion

=== Former members ===
- Andrew Gleason - bass
- Todd Caras - guitar, bass
- Chisolm Thompson - guitar
- Spencer McGhin - guitar
- Kimberley Saint Thomas - bass

== Discography ==
=== Studio albums ===
- Gender (2008, Stickfigure Records/Adistant Sound; 2009, Duchess Archive)

=== Singles ===
- "Safe at One"/"The Queen's Beasts (Or Suffer Fools)" (2003, Stickfigure Records)
- "Patroness"/"The Cold Fraction" (2005, Luminal Records)

=== EPs ===
- A Spectre Is Haunting Europe/Entertainment split vinyl 12" with A Spectre Is Haunting Europe (2006, Simulacre Media/Adistant Sound)

=== Compilations ===
- "A Matter of Gender" Outtakes and Demos (2008, Duchess Archive/Adistant Sound)

=== Compilation appearances ===
- "Shadow and Shadow" on Dots to Connect: The Music of the Prids (2009, Five03 Records)
- "Distance" on SOM▲ – A Disaro Mixed Tape (2011, Disaro Records)
