= Rachel Reinert =

American country music singer, songwriter, and musician (born 1989)

- Reinert performing with Gloriana in 2012

Background information
- Born: March 10, 1989 (age 37); Sarasota, Florida
- Origin: Santa Ana, California Nashville, Tennessee
- Genres: Country, country-pop, pop
- Occupations: Singer, songwriter
- Instruments: Vocals, guitar
- Years active: 2008–present
- Labels: Emblem (Gloriana); Reprise (Gloriana); Warner Bros. Nashville (Gloriana); Green Iris
- Formerly of: Gloriana
- Website: rachelreinertmusic.com

Rachel Reinert (born March 10, 1989) is an American country music singer, songwriter, and musician from Santa Ana, California. Reinert began her career as a recording artist in 2008 as a member of the country group Gloriana, contributing to gold and platinum singles and opening tours for Taylor Swift, Sheryl Crow, Rascal Flatts, Alan Jackson, Jason Aldean, Brooks & Dunn, and Zac Brown Band. In 2016, she left Gloriana and began a career as a solo artist. Reinert signed to Nashville-based independent label Green Iris Records and released her debut solo album Into the Blue in March, 2020.

== Early life ==
Reinert was born on March 10, 1989, in Sarasota, Florida. Her family moved to Marietta, Georgia, where she lived until age 6 when they relocated to Santa Ana, California. Reinert attended Orange County School of the Arts where she took lessons in singing, guitar, and piano and also participated in the musical theater program. Reinert began writing poetry at a young age and setting her words to music. At the age of 15, Reinert took her first trip to Nashville, Tennessee, with a friend. Later that same year, she signed her first publishing deal and began traveling back and forth from Orange County to Nashville while finishing high school through independent study. Reinert moved to Nashville full time at the age of 17 after graduating from high school.

== Career ==
=== 2007–2016: Gloriana ===
After moving to Nashville to pursue her career in country music full-time, Reinert began posting her songs on her Myspace page. In 2007, brothers Mike and Tom Gossin discovered Reinert's music online and reached out to ask her to get together to write. Reinert and the Gossin brothers began writing songs together regularly and performing around Nashville as a trio. After a performance at local Nashville venue 3rd and Lindsley, Reinert, Mike, and Tom were introduced to musician Cheyenne Kimball. Kimball joined the group and the four began writing and performing together.

The band met producer and Emblem Records label head Matt Serletic and signed a joint deal with Emblem and Warner Bros. Records in July 2008. They began recording a record under the name Gloriana. Gloriana released their first single "Wild at Heart" in early 2009 and began touring, opening for artists including LeAnn Rimes, Brooks & Dunn, and joined Taylor Swift on her Fearless Tour from 2009 to 2010. "Wild at Heart" became the highest selling single for a new country artist or band in 2009.

In August 2009, the band released their first album, the self-titled Gloriana, debuting at #2 on the Billboard Country Album Chart and #3 on Billboard's Top 200. Reinert was a cowriter on the last track of the album, "Time To Let Me Go." Gloriana released two more singles from their debut album: "How Far Do You Wanna Go?" and "The World Is Ours Tonight." The success of the album led to multiple awards and recognitions for Gloriana, including the 2009 American Music Awards Breakthrough Artist of the Year award and the 2010 Academy of Country Music award for Top New Vocal Group.

Gloriana released "Wanna Take You Home," the first single off of their second album, in 2011. Cheyenne Kimball abruptly departed from Gloriana in July 2011, but Reinert, Mike, and Tom continued as a trio and kept working on their next album. "(Kissed You) Good Night" was released as the next single and the first without Kimball, in October 2011. This single was the most successful of the band's lifespan. "(Kissed You) Good Night" was recognized as country radio's most played single by a group for 2012 and earned RIAA Platinum certification in 2013. A Thousand Miles Left Behind, Gloriana's second studio album, was released on July 31, 2012. Reinert cowrote 3 tracks on the album: "Go On...Miss Me," "Doing It Our Way," and "Where My Heart Belongs." In September 2012, Gloriana released "Can't Shake You" as the last single from A Thousand Miles Left Behind.

The band put out the song "Best Night Ever" in December 2013 as a standalone single. They released "Trouble" in October 2014 as the first and only single from their third album. Gloriana's third studio album, Three, was released on June 2, 2015 featuring 5 tracks cowritten by Reinert: "Trouble," "Wanna Get To Know You," "Let's Take a Shot," "Get Back That Goodbye," and "Lighters."

On January 6, 2016, Reinert announced her decision to part ways with Gloriana. She shared the news with fans via Twitter and disclosed that she would be pursuing a career as a solo artist.

=== 2016–present: Solo career ===
After 8 years with Gloriana, Reinert began writing towards her first solo project. Reinert's producer and cowriter Davis Naish (Eric Church, Katelyn Tarver) helped to sculpt her sound into what she describes as her own brand of "California country."

Reinert independently released her first solo single "Cool," cowritten by Reinert, Davis Naish, and Melissa Fuller, on July 18, 2018. Reinert shared the official music video for "Cool" on August 7, 2018, directed by Elizabeth Olmsted. "Cool" was followed up on October 26, 2019, by her second independently released single "Dark Star," cowritten by Reinert, K.S. Rhoads, and Joe Pisapia. The official music video for "Dark Star" was directed by Jeremiah Dunlap and premiered on December 1, 2018.

The song "Cool" caught the attention of songwriter, producer, and head of A&R for Green Iris Records, Jon Randall. On February 20, 2019, it was announced that Reinert simultaneously signed a multi-album deal with Nashville-based independent record label Green Iris Records and a publishing agreement with Still Working Music. Both companies are under the umbrella of Roy Orbison's estate and run by president and Roy Orbison's youngest son, Alex Orbison.

Reinert released "All We Have," her first single with Green Iris and third as a solo artist, on April 26, 2019. "All We Have" was cowritten by Reinert, Davis Naish, and Melissa Fuller (the same team that wrote "Cool"). The music video for "All We Have" was directed by Josh Kranich and premiered with CMT on September 26, 2019. In late January 2020, Rachel announced that her debut solo album would be out in March 2020. Soon after, on February 14, 2020, Reinert released her next single, "Some Kind of Angel," written by Reinert, Davis Naish, and Autumn McEntire. Reinert also made the track "Secret," written by Reinert, Naish, and Fuller, available for listening one week prior to the album release.

==== Into the Blue ====
On March 13, 2020, Reinert released her debut solo album Into the Blue. The album consists of 11 songs, all cowritten by Reinert and produced by Davis Naish. Some collaborators on the album include Tommy Lee James (cowriter), Rob McNelley (electric guitar), Rosi Golan (cowriter), Garrison Starr (cowriter), Ryan Hewitt (mixing), and more. Reinert's husband Caleb Crosby, drummer in the rock band Tyler Bryant & The Shakedown, played percussion on the majority of the tracks. Into the Blue was met with praise from many, including notable music journalist Bob Paxman, Billboard, American Songwriter, E! News, and more.

Reinert premiered her official music video for the song "Here" off of Into the Blue on May 12, 2020. The video was directed by Josh Kranich and was shot in Nashville shortly before the city was shut down due to Coronavirus safety precautions. The "Here" video features a professional dancer throughout name Andrew Rincon. Rincon has been Reinert's best friend since they met in middle school while both attending OCSA.

== Personal life ==
In 2014, Reinert began dating Caleb Crosby after meeting when Crosby was hired to play drums for a limited run on tour with Gloriana. The couple became engaged on Valentine's Day of 2019 after over 4 years of dating. On August 31, 2019, in Bloomington Springs, Tennessee, Reinert and Crosby married in a bohemian-inspired ceremony. Their wedding was featured on the cover of the Spring 2020 issue of Southern Bride magazine.

== Discography ==
=== Studio albums ===
Solo
| Title | Details |
|---|---|
| Into the Blue | Release Date: March 13, 2020; Label: Green Iris Records; Format: CD, digital download, vinyl |

==== With Gloriana ====
- Gloriana (2009)
- A Thousand Miles Left Behind (2012)
- Three (2015)

=== Official music videos ===
| Year | Video | Director |
|---|---|---|
| 2018 | "Cool" | Elizabeth Olmstead |
| 2018 | "Dark Star" | Jeremiah Dunlap |
| 2019 | "All We Have" | Josh Kranich |
| 2020 | "Here" | Josh Kranich |
