= A Thousand Miles Left Behind =

Studio album by Gloriana
- Released: July 31, 2012
- Genre: Country
- Length: 42:47
- Label: Emblem/Warner Bros. Nashville
- Producer: Matt Serletic

Gloriana chronology
Gloriana (2009)	A Thousand Miles Left Behind (2012)	Three (2015)

Singles from A Thousand Miles Left Behind
- 1. "Wanna Take You Home" Released: March 28, 2011; 2. "(Kissed You) Good Night" Released: October 17, 2011; 3. "Can't Shake You" Released: September 10, 2012

Professional ratings
Review scores
Source	Rating
Allmusic	3/5 stars

A Thousand Miles Left Behind is the second studio album by American country music band Gloriana. It was released on July 31, 2012 via Emblem Music Group/Warner Bros. Records.

== Content ==
It is their first album since the departure of band member Cheyenne Kimball in 2011. According to group member Tom Gossin, the album was completed before Kimball's departure, but the songs (including "Wanna Take You Home") were then re-recorded without her. A song that Kimball wrote (called "Piece of My Heart") was also removed from the track list.

The trio had a hand in writing all of the album's eleven tracks. Three singles have been released from the project, including the group's first top five song, "(Kissed You) Good Night."

== Commercial performance ==
A Thousand Miles Left Behind debuted at No. 2 on Country Albums, and No. 11 on Billboard 200, selling 23,000 copies in its first week. It has sold 118,000 copies in the US as of May 2015.

== Track listing ==
No.	Title	Writer(s)	Length
1.	"Gold Rush"	Tom Gossin, Tommy Lee James, Matt Serletic	4:16
2.	"Sunset Lovin'"	Mike Gossin, Serletic, Hillary Lindsey	3:17
3.	"Wanna Take You Home"	T. Gossin, Serletic, Wendell Mobley	3:45
4.	"(Kissed You) Good Night"	T. Gossin, Josh Kear	3:52
5.	"Carolina Rose"	T. Gossin, Karyn Rochelle, James T. Slater	3:50
6.	"Go On…Miss Me"	M. Gossin, Rachel Reinert, Serletic	3:43
7.	"Can't Shake You"	T. Gossin, Slater, Stephanie Bentley	4:27
8.	"Soldier Song"	M. Gossin, T. Gossin, Serletic	4:02
9.	"Turn My World Around"	M. Gossin, Kear, Serletic	3:42
10.	"Doing It Our Way"	Danny Myrick, Reinert, Serletic	3:44
11.	"Where My Heart Belongs"	Myrick, Reinert, Serletic	4:09

iTunes Deluxe Edition bonus tracks
No.	Title	Writer(s)	Length
12.	"Lonely Road"		3:47
13.	"Wild at Heart" (Acoustic)	Bentley, Kear, Serletic	3:50
14.	"Can't Shake You" (Acoustic)	T. Gossin, Slater, Bentley	4:24
15.	"(Kissed You) Good Night" (Music video)		4:42
16.	"Making of A Thousand Miles Left Behind" (Video)		4:06

== Personnel ==
=== Gloriana ===
- Mike Gossin- electric guitar, vocals
- Tom Gossin- acoustic guitar, programming, vocals
- Rachel Reinert- vocals

=== Additional musicians ===
- Alex Arias- choir
- Pat Bergeson- harmonica
- Tom Bukovac- dobro, acoustic guitar, electric guitar
- Eric Darken- percussion
- Dan Dugmore- dobro, pedal steel guitar
- Shannon Forrest- drums
- Aubrey Haynie- fiddle, mandolin
- Ryan Kern- choir
- Mike Leisz- choir
- Jerry McPherson- electric guitar
- Tim Pierce- acoustic guitar, electric guitar
- Matt Serletic- Fender Rhodes, Hammond B-3 organ, keyboards, percussion, piano, programming, Wurlitzer
- Jimmie Lee Sloas- bass guitar
- Ilya Toshinsky- banjo, dulcimer, acoustic guitar, mandolin
- Doug Trantow- choir

== Chart performance ==
=== Album ===
Chart (2012)	Peak position
US Billboard 200	11
US Billboard Top Country Albums	2

=== End of year charts ===
Chart (2012)	Year-end 2010
US Billboard Top Country Albums	63

=== Singles ===
Year	Single	Peak chart positions			
Year	Single	US Country	US Country Airplay	US	CAN
2011	"Wanna Take You Home"	34	—	—	—
2011	"(Kissed You) Good Night"	2	—	34	60
2012	"Can't Shake You"	20	16	83	—
"—" denotes releases that did not chart
