= Lie Lie Lie =

Lie Lie Lie may refer to:

- Lie Lie Lie (Serj Tankian song), 2007
- Lie Lie Lie (Joshua Bassett song), 2021
- Lie Lie Lie, a song by Bonnie Pink, from the album Heaven's Kitchen
- Lie Lie Lie, a song by Lee Juck
- Lie Lie Lie, a song by Metric, from the album Pagans in Vegas
- Lie, Lie, Lie, a song by White Town, from the album Socialism, Sexism & Sexuality
- Lie, Lie, Lie, a song by Myra, from the album Myra
