= McLeod Center =

Multi-purpose arena in Cedar Falls, Iowa

- The Cloud
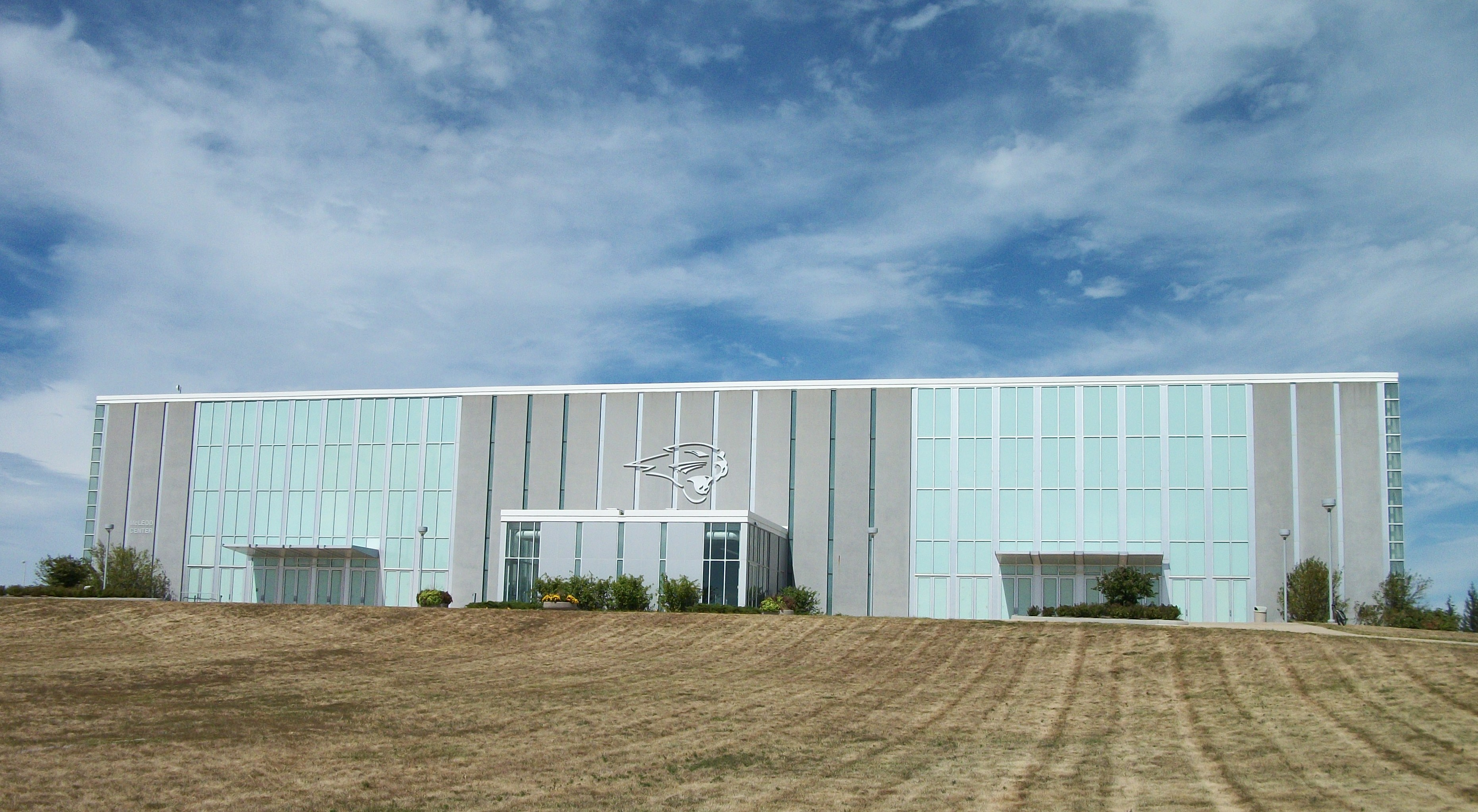
- Interactive map of McLeod Center
- Location: Cedar Falls, Iowa, United States
- Coordinates: 42.51395°N 92.46714°W
- Owner: University of Northern Iowa
- Operator: University of Northern Iowa
- Capacity: 7,018
- Surface: Multi-surface
- Public transit: 9 10 MET Transit

Construction
- Groundbreaking: October 9, 2004
- Built: 2004–2006
- Opened: November 18, 2006
- Cost: $26 million ($41.5 million in 2025 dollars)
- Architects: HLKB Architecture; Crawford Architects
- Structural engineers: Martin/Martin, Inc.
- Services engineers: M-E Engineers, Inc.
- General contractor: Cardinal Construction

Tenant
- UNI Panthers (NCAA DI) (2006–present)

The McLeod Center is a 7,018-seat multi-purpose arena on the campus of the University of Northern Iowa (UNI) in Cedar Falls, Iowa, USA, currently housing the university's teams in men's and women's basketball, and women's volleyball. The arena opened on November 18, 2006, with a volleyball game against Bradley. The other three UNI teams made their debuts in the facility over the next three days — men's basketball versus Milwaukee on November 19, women's basketball against Iowa State on November 20, and wrestling versus Iowa on November 21.

The McLeod Center replaced the UNI-Dome as the home of the university's basketball teams and West Gymnasium as the home of the volleyball and wrestling teams (the wrestling squad moved back to the West Gym after the 2007-2008 season). The McLeod Center is located on the west end of the campus, directly south of the UNI-Dome and connected by a covered walkway that also houses an extensive athletic hall of fame.

A video board is located on the south wall with home and visiting team scoreboards on either side showing the players' game information. There are two scoreboards on the north side and ribbon boards above the concession stands on the east and west sides.

Since opening, the arena has had quite a significant positive economic impact for the university. It brings in $20–25 million annually, doubled the attendance of basketball games, and has almost 400,000 visitors a year.

The arena also hosts commencement ceremonies throughout the year and can be used for recreation upon request.

During the 2009-2010, 2014-2015, and 2019-2020 men's basketball seasons, the team was undefeated at the McLeod Center.

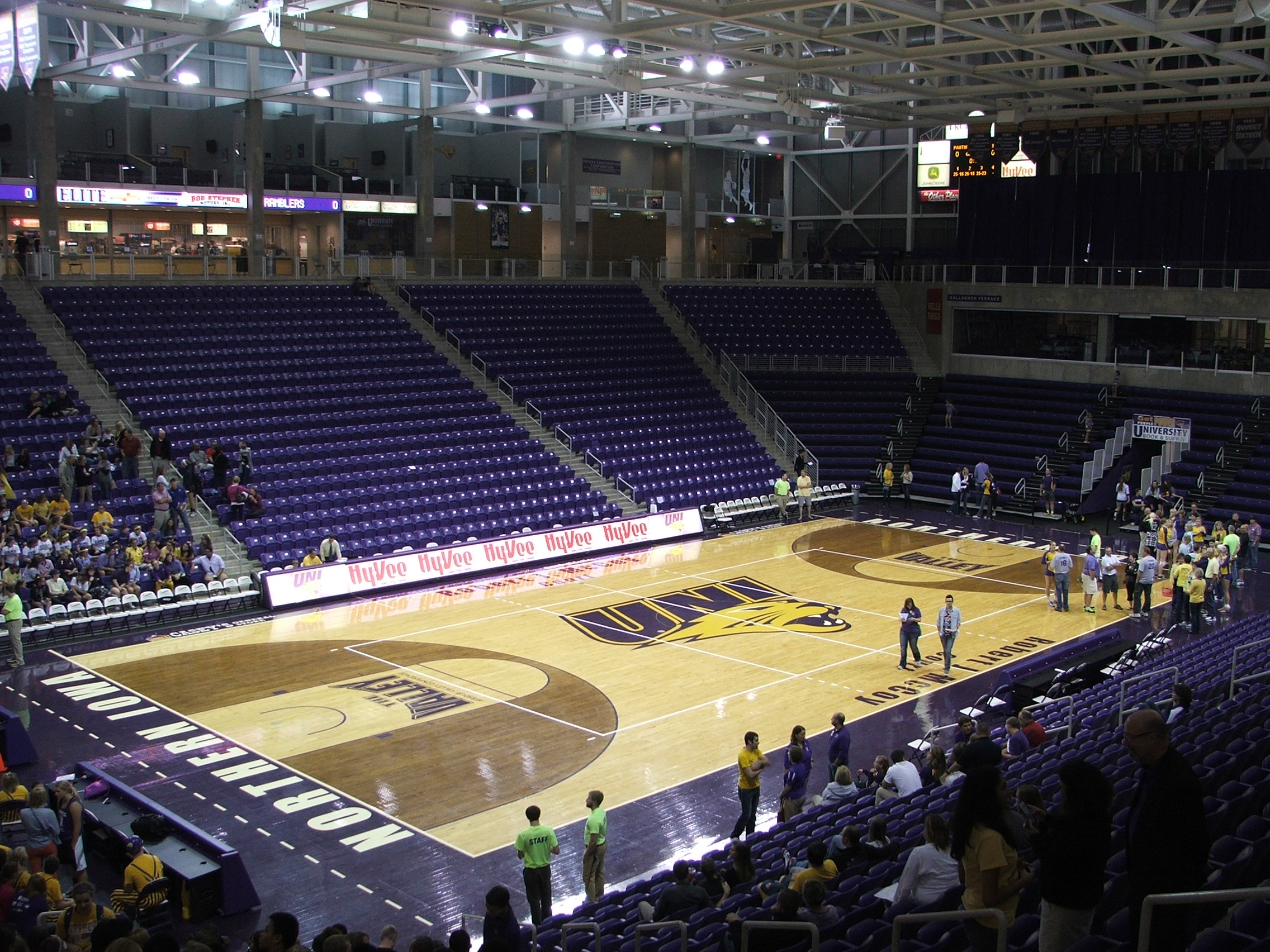
McLeod Center Interior

For the first time in venue history, they sold out every seat for a women's basketball game against the Iowa Hawkeyes and Caitlin Clark on November 12, 2023.

== Other use ==
- On May 18, 2010, the McLeod Center was the first building in Iowa to host the 14th Dalai Lama.
- On October 24, 2010, Bob Dylan performed at the venue.
- Other artists who have performed include Brad Paisley, Luke Bryan, Rodney Atkins, The All-American Rejects, Meat Loaf, Miranda Lambert, Gloriana and Alan Jackson.
- The Stadium also hosts the yearly Iowa Regional for the FIRST Robotics Competition

== See also ==
- List of NCAA Division I basketball arenas
