= AMTK =

AMTK may refer to:

- America's Most Talented Kid, a former U.S. talent/reality TV series
- Amtrak, the National Railroad Passenger Corporation of the United States, which has a reporting mark AMTK
