= Sky Is Over =

Serj Tankian song

Single by Serj Tankian

from the album Elect the Dead
- Released: January 16, 2008 (Radio); February 2008 (promo CD); March 28, 2008 (Acoustic promo CD); March 31, 2008 (CD)
- Recorded: 2006–2007
- Genre: Acoustic rock; industrial metal
- Length: 2:59
- Label: Serjical Strike/Reprise
- Songwriter: Serj Tankian
- Producer: Serj Tankian

Serj Tankian singles chronology
"Lie Lie Lie" (2007)	"Sky Is Over" (2008)	"Fears" (2008)

"Sky Is Over" is a song by Serj Tankian.The song was released as the second single from Tankian's debut solo album Elect the Dead. The song charted on both the Modern Rock Tracks and the Mainstream Rock Tracks in the US.

== Song meaning ==
This song is worked around the now defunct website skyisover.com which Tankian supports. This means that the song is about pollution and global warming. Tankian said also, about the meaning of the song, in an interview with Roadrunner Records:

I've always thought of the sky as, like, an open canvas. When I was a kid and I looked at the sky, I always remember being able to daydream, just looking at the sky, being creative, being able to design things. What would happen if we had no sky? Where would we be? Well, obviously, scientifically, without an atmosphere, we'd all be dead.

— Serj Tankian, Roadrunner Records

== Music video ==
Elect the Dead was accompanied by a complete set of videos for each track, September 11, 2007. Tankian was not pleased by the original video and so he and director Tony Petrossian made an official video for "Sky Is Over", released on January 16, 2008.

The music video begins with Tankian playing a white piano in the middle of the street. After establishing the main piano melody, he gets up, walks down the street, and picks up a chalkboard eraser. With the eraser he begins literally "erasing" the sky out with erratic swipes over the wordless chorus, then throws the eraser far away and walks to a black piano to play the last note. The camera pans up to reveal that amid the random eraser swipes he has written civilization is over. The entire video was shot in one take. At the end of the video a web address is shown for the now defunct "Sky Is Over" website, which gave links to various environmental organizations.

== Track listing ==
- All songs written by Tankian.

=== Radio edit promo single ===
No.	Title	Length
1.	"Sky Is Over" (Radio edit)	2:59

=== 2 Track promo ===
No.	Title	Length
1.	"Sky Is Over" (Acoustic)	2:57
2.	"Empty Walls" (Acoustic)	3:46

=== Official UK CD single ===
No.	Title	Writer(s)	Length
1.	"Sky Is Over"		2:59
2.	"Sky Is Over" (Fawk Yeah Remix)	Tankian	3:38

=== Digital download single ===
No.	Title	Writer(s)	Length
1.	"Sky Is Over"		2:59
2.	"Sky Is Over" (Fawk Yeah Remix)	Tankian	3:38
3.	"Sky Is Over" (Acoustic)		2:59

== Chart positions ==
Chart (2008)	Peak position
US Alternative Airplay (Billboard)	22
US Mainstream Rock (Billboard)	23
