= You Gotta Love the Life =

Studio album by Melissa Manchester
- Released: February 10, 2015
- Studio: Citrus College (Glendora, California); Stu Stu Studio (Los Angeles, California); Sugar Hill Studios (Houston, Texas); Jr's Studio; Jan Stevens Studio
- Genre: Smooth jazz; blues
- Length: 54:34
- Label: Long Run Entertainment, L.L.C.
- Producer: Melissa Manchester; Terry Wollman

Melissa Manchester chronology
When I Look Down That Road (2004)	You Gotta Love the Life (2015)

Singles from You Gotta Love The Life
- 1. "Be My Baby (edit)" Released: October 2012; 2. "Feelin' For You" Released: January 2015; 3. "Big Light" Released: June 2015; 4. "You Gotta Love The Life" Released: July 2015

You Gotta Love The Life is an album by the Grammy Award-winning singer and songwriter Melissa Manchester in 2015. Her 20th studio album, and her first since When I Look Down That Road (2004), the fourteen-track album is primarily written by Melissa, with four tracks being covers of well-known standards, and includes a longer version of the 2013, single release of, "Be My Baby", celebrating the fiftieth anniversary of the Ronettes' release of the song.

You Gotta Love The Life features duets with Al Jarreau and Dionne Warwick with feature instrumentals provided by Keb' Mo', guitars on "Feelin' for You", Joe Sample plays keyboards on "Other End of the Phone", Dave Koz' saxophone on "Claudia" and Stevie Wonder plays harmonica on "Your Love is Where I Live".

Melissa, an adjunct professor at the USC Thornton School of Music, was encouraged by her students to make the indie album, they informed her of the availability of crowdfunding opportunities, and in August 2013, Indiegogo was chosen for the album's fundraising platform. The first acknowledgements from the album-insert, thank Melissa's long-time manager, Sue Holder and former student, Barry Harris for spearheading and managing the Indiegogo campaign.

A shortened version of "Be My Baby" was released in August 2013, to kick off the crowdfunding campaign; the first single release in connection with the album debut was, "Feelin' for You", written by Melissa Manchester and Sara Niemietz. The song was inspired by a drunk in a juke joint; when his advances were rebuffed by Melissa, he said, "Too bad, cause I got a feelin' for you." "Feelin' for You" was pre-released as a single on January 9, 2015, includes a solo by Keb' Mo', and premiered at #2 on the Smooth jazz charts. A second single, "Big Light", featuring Al Jarreau, with an accompanying music video was released to radio on June 15, 2015. y You

You Gotta Love the Life was released on February 10, 2015, and hit #17 on the Billboard Magazine Jazz Albums chart for the week of February 28, 2015.

- It has been noted that the song, "Other End of the Phone", featuring Dionne Warwick, contains the final lyrics published by Hal David and is one of Joe Sample's final recordings.

== Track list ==
You Gotta Love the Life
No.	Title	Writer(s)	Length
1.	"You Gotta Love the Life"	Melissa Manchester, Sharon Vaughn	4:38
2.	"Feelin' for You" (featuring Keb' Mo' – guitar)	Melissa Manchester, Sara Niemietz	3:43
3.	"Be My Baby" (full version)	Phil Spector, Ellie Greenwich, Jeff Barry	4:38
4.	"Big Light" (featuring Al Jarreau)	Melissa Manchester, John Proulx	4:04
5.	"Other End of the Phone" (featuring Dionne Warwick and Joe Sample)	Melissa Manchester, Hal David	4:43
6.	"You Are My Heart"	Melissa Manchester	3:45
7.	"Let's Face the Music and Dance / From This Moment On"	Irving Berlin, Cole Porter	3:45
8.	"Claudia" (featuring Dave Koz – saxophone)	Steven Cagan	4:37
9.	"Your Love is Where I Live" (featuring Stevie Wonder – harmonica)	Melissa Manchester, Tom Snow	3:31
10.	"No There There"	Melissa Manchester, Paul Reiser	4:00
11.	"Open My Heart to Your Love"	Melissa Manchester, Michael Ochs	2:59
12.	"The Other One"	Melissa Manchester	3:59
13.	"I Know Who I Am"	Melissa Manchester, Joanna Cotten, Greg Barnhill	3:53
14.	"Something Wonderful" (Bonus: available exclusively on the full album)	Richard Rodgers, Oscar Hammerstein	2:25

== Personnel ==
- Melissa Manchester – lead vocals, backing vocals (1–3, 6, 9–11, 13, 14), vocal arrangements (1, 2, 6, 9, 11, 13, 14), acoustic piano (6, 10–12), percussion (6), arrangements (7, 8)
- John Proulx – acoustic piano (1, 4, 9)
- Steve Welch – organ (1, 13), Fender Rhodes (4, 9, 10), acoustic piano (6), synthesizers (7, 9, 11)
- Dwan Hill – organ (2)
- Stephan Oberhoff – acoustic piano (3, 7, 8, 13), synth harp (3), guitars (7, 12), arrangements (7), synthesizers (11), accordion (11)
- Joe Sample – acoustic piano (5), Fender Rhodes (5), arrangements (5)
- Peter Hume – guitars (1, 10, 13)
- Keb' Mo' – guitar (2)
- Terry Wollman – horn arrangements (1), guitars (3, 4, 9), percussion (6), backing vocals (10), mandolin (11), mando-guitar (11), arrangements (11), vocal arrangements (14)
- Abraham Laboriel – bass (1, 4–10), guitars (8)
- Loren Clark – bass (2)
- Steve Wilkinson – bass (3, 11–13)
- John Lewis – drums (1, 4, 7–13), percussion (3)
- Marcus Finnie – drums (2)
- John Robinson – drums (5)
- Lenny Castro – percussion (1, 4, 6–10, 12, 13)
- Tom Evans – baritone saxophone (1), tenor saxophone (1)
- Dave Koz – saxophone (8)
- Steve Baxter – trombone (1)
- Lee Thornburg – trumpet (1), flugelhorn (1), horn arrangements (1)
- Antonio Pontarelli – violin (7)
- Stevie Wonder – harmonica (9)
- Vangie Gunn – backing vocals (1)
- Susan Holder – backing vocals (1, 3, 6, 11, 13, 14)
- Al Jarreau – lead and backing vocals (4)
- Dionne Warwick – lead vocals (5)
- Garrison Holder – backing vocals (10)
- Melanie Taylor – backing vocals (11, 13)
- The Citrus Singers – backing vocals (13)

=== Production ===
- Dan Thom – executive producer
- Susan Thom – executive producer
- Melissa Manchester – producer
- Terry Wollman – producer
- Tim Jacquette – engineer, mixing
- Steve Sykes – engineer
- Casey Wasner – additional engineer (2)
- Andy Bradley – additional engineer (5)
- Peter Kelsey – additional engineer (8)
- Bernie Grundman – mastering at Bernie Grundman Mastering (Hollywood, California)
- Lena Ringstad – graphic design, photography
- Adam Cohen – photography
- Randee St. Nicholas – photography
