= Gloriana (album) =

Studio album by Gloriana
- Released: August 4, 2009 (NA); January 11, 2010 (AUS)
- Recorded: Black Bird Studios (Nashville, TN); Emblem Studios (Calabasas, CA)
- Genre: Country
- Length: 47:12
- Labels: Emblem/New Revolution; Reprise Nashville; Warner Bros. Nashville
- Producer: Matt Serletic

Gloriana chronology
The Way It Goes (EP) (2009)	Gloriana (2009)	A Thousand Miles Left Behind (2012)

Singles from Gloriana
- 1. "Wild at Heart" Released: February 2, 2009; 2. "How Far Do You Wanna Go?" Released: September 28, 2009; 3. "The World Is Ours Tonight" Released: February 8, 2010

Gloriana is the debut studio album by American country music group Gloriana. It was released in North America on August 4, 2009 and in Australia on January 11, 2010, via Emblem Music Group, with Warner Bros. Records Nashville serving as distributor. The album debuted at position number 3 on US Billboard 200, and number 2 on Billboard Country Albums. The album spawned two singles in "Wild at Heart" and "How Far Do You Wanna Go?". The album was re-released in March 2010 to include "The World Is Ours Tonight," which was released in March 2010 as the album's third single. This is their only studio album with Cheyenne Kimball.

== Content ==
Several of the album's tracks were co-written by Emblem Music Group owner Matt Serletic, who also produced the album. Among his credits are the album's first two singles, "Wild at Heart" and "How Far Do You Wanna Go?" He co-wrote the former with Josh Kear and former Epic Records artist Stephanie Bentley, and the latter with Jeffrey Steele and former Western Flyer member Danny Myrick. "Wild at Heart" was the group's debut single and reached a peak of number 15 on the U.S. Billboard Hot Country Songs chart. The second single, "How Far Do You Wanna Go?" was released in September 2009, and was a minor Top 40 hit.

The album was re-issued on March 22, 2010, to include "The World Is Ours Tonight," which was recorded for the 2010 Winter Olympics. It was released as the album's third single in February 2010; it debuted at number 51 on the U.S. Billboard Hot Country Songs chart for the week of April 3, 2010 and reached a peak of number 37. All proceeds from the single went to Team USA.

== Critical reception ==
Professional ratings
Review scores
Source	Rating
AllMusic	3/5 stars
Country Standard Time	
Country Weekly	3.5/5 stars
Entertainment Weekly	C
The 9513	3/5 stars
Roughstock	favorable

The album has received mixed reviews, with the main point of criticism being over-production. Chris Neal of Country Weekly magazine gave the album three-and-a-half stars out of five. He noted the vocal harmonies and the shared lead vocals among all four members, and added "[Serletic] sometimes obscures the songs with sonic knickknacks they don't need." AllMusic critic Stephen Thomas Erlewine rated the album three stars out of five, saying that the band's sound was "stylized synthesis of Fleetwood Mac and '70s Californian country rock" and "country in name only." He also said that the sound was "entirely too slick" on some tracks but reminiscent of "prime Rick Springfield" on others. Jim Malec of The 9513 also gave a three-star review, saying the songs were well written and performed, but lacked a sense of personality. Country Standard Time writer Jessica Phillips considered the album overproduced as well, but added that the band "seem[s] to have found a comfortable niche" and noted a theme of relationships among each song. Whitney Pastorek of Entertainment Weekly gave a C rating, saying that the band "falls somewhere between maudlin boy band songwriting clichés and a particularly melodramatic Six Flags country revue." She cited "Come and Save Me" and "Time to Let Me Go" as the strongest tracks due to their simpler production. Bobby Peacock of Roughstock was favorable, criticizing some tracks for their production but also saying, "The lyrics may not be terribly substantial, but at the same time, they're not trite or overused, and none of the songs tries to puff itself up with a sense of melodrama. Most of the melodies are just a little bit different...Each song has a slightly different sound than the one before it".

== Track listing ==
No.	Title	Writer(s)	Length
1.	"How Far Do You Wanna Go?"	Danny Myrick, Matt Serletic, Jeffrey Steele	3:50
2.	"Wild at Heart"	Stephanie Bentley, Josh Kear, Serletic	3:42
3.	"The Way It Goes"	Myrick, Serletic, Steele	3:15
4.	"Lead Me On"	Bentley, Ben Glover	4:05
5.	"If You’re Leavin’"	Bentley, Trey Bruce, Kevin Kadish	2:39
6.	"You Said"	Chuck Jones, Serletic, Steele	2:44
7.	"Cry on Command"	Kear, Wayne Kirkpatrick, Serletic	3:57
8.	"Over Me Now"	Tyler Hayes, Karyn Rochelle, Shane Stevens	3:00
9.	"Come and Save Me"	Jess Cates, Lindy Robbins, Serletic	3:36
10.	"Even If I Wanted To"	Jones, Serletic, Steele	3:55
11.	"All the Things That Mean the Most"	Myrick, Serletic, Steele	3:53
12.	"Change Your Mind"	Glover, Jennifer Schott, John Paul White	3:46
13.	"Time to Let Me Go"	Kyle Cook, Mike Gossin, Tom Gossin, Rachel Reinert	5:02

Reissue Version
No.	Title	Writer(s)	Length
1.	"How Far Do You Wanna Go?"	Danny Myrick, Matt Serletic, Jeffrey Steele	3:28
2.	"Wild at Heart"	Stephanie Bentley, Josh Kear, Serletic	3:41
3.	"The Way It Goes"	Myrick, Serletic, Steele	3:14
4.	"The World Is Ours Tonight"	Cates, Robbins, Serletic	3:32
5.	"If You’re Leavin’"	Bentley, Bruce, Kadish	2:38
6.	"Lead Me On"	Bentley, Glover	3:54
7.	"You Said"	Jones, Serletic, Steele	2:41
8.	"Cry on Command"	Kear, Kirkpatrick, Serletic	3:55
9.	"Over Me Now"	Hayes, Rochelle, Stevens	2:58
10.	"Come and Save Me"	Cates, Robbins, Serletic	3:35
11.	"Even If I Wanted To"	Jones, Serletic, Steele	3:53
12.	"All the Things That Mean the Most"	Myrick, Serletic, Steele	3:52
13.	"Change Your Mind"	Glover, Schott, White	3:45
14.	"Time to Let Me Go"	Cook, Gossin, Gossin, Reinert	5:02

iTunes bonus tracks
No.	Title	Writer(s)	Length
14.	"How Far Do You Wanna Go?" (Live)	Myrick, Serletic, Steele	4:38
15.	"The Way it Goes" (Live)	Myrick, Serletic, Steele	3:42

iTunes pre-order bonus track
No.	Title	Writer(s)	Length
16.	"Wild at Heart" (Live)	Bentley, Kear, Serletic	4:09

Australian bonus track
No.	Title	Writer(s)	Length
14.	"Wild at Heart" (Numix)	Bentley, Kear, Serletic	3:39

== Personnel ==
Gloriana

- Mike Gossin - vocals; acoustic guitar (6)
- Tom Gossin - vocals; piano (8)
- Cheyenne Kimball - vocals
- Rachel Reinert - vocals

Additional musicians

- Alex Arias - hand claps (1)
- Kenny Aronoff - drums (1, 3, 4, 5, 6, 11), percussion (3, 6)
- Stevie Blacke - strings (4, 7, 11)
- Tom Bukovac - electric guitar (2, 7–10, 12, 13), acoustic guitar (2, 7–10, 13)
- Jack Daley - bass guitar (1, 3–6, 11)
- Mark Dobson - road case (2), shaker (9)
- Dan Dugmore - steel guitar (2–5, 7, 8, 10–13), Dobro (2, 9, 10)
- "Everyone" - hand claps (2)
- Aubrey Haynie - mandolin (2, 8–10), fiddle (7–10, 12, 13)
- Mike Leisz - hand claps (1)
- Chris McHugh - drums (2, 7–10, 13), programming (2, 7, 9, 10, 13)
- Tim Pierce - electric guitar (1–11), acoustic guitar (10)
- Matt Serletic - Hammond organ (1, 2, 3, 5, 6, 7, 9, 10), programming (1–7, 9–11), synthesizer bass (2), accordion (2), road case (2), keyboards (4, 6, 11), piano (5–8, 11, 12), strings (7), Wurlitzer electric piano (12, 13)
- Kevin Sloan - hand claps (1)
- Jimmie Lee Sloas - bass guitar (2, 7–10, 13)
- Bryan Sutton - acoustic guitar (1, 3–6, 11), mandolin (1, 3–6), banjo (1, 3, 5), slide guitar (3), Dobro (6, 11)
- Ilya Toshinsky - acoustic guitar (2, 7–10, 12, 13), banjo (2, 8, 10), bouzouki (10)
- Patrick Warren - Wurlitzer electric piano (8), Hammond organ (8), Chamberlin (8), programming (8)
- Gabe Witcher - fiddle (1, 3–6, 11)
- Glenn Worf - upright bass (9, 13)

Technical

- Mark Dobson - recording (all tracks)
- Chris Lord-Alge - mixing (1, 2, 4)
- Justin Niebank - mixing (3, 5–13), recording (all tracks except 1, 4)
- Matt Serletic - producer (all tracks)

== Chart performance ==
The album debuted at No. 2 on Top Country Albums, and No. 3 on the Billboard 200, selling 44,000 in its first week. As of August 2012, the album has sold over 235,000 copies.

=== Weekly charts ===
Chart (2009–2010)	Peak position
Australian Albums (ARIA)	43
Australian Country Albums (ARIA)	3
US Billboard 200	3
US Top Country Albums (Billboard)	2

=== Year-end charts ===
Chart (2009)	Position
US Top Country Albums (Billboard)	45
Chart (2010)	Position
US Top Country Albums (Billboard)	62

=== Singles ===
Year	Single	Peak chart positions	
Year	Single	US Country	US
2009	"Wild at Heart"	15	53
2009	"How Far Do You Wanna Go?"	36	—
2010	"The World Is Ours Tonight"	37	—
"—" denotes releases that did not chart
