= (Kissed You) Good Night =

Single by Gloriana

from the album A Thousand Miles Left Behind
- Released: October 17, 2011
- Genre: Country
- Length: 3:52 (album version); 3:35 (radio edit)
- Label: Emblem; Warner Bros. Nashville
- Songwriters: Tom Gossin; Josh Kear
- Producer: Matt Serletic

Gloriana singles chronology
"Wanna Take You Home" (2011)	"(Kissed You) Good Night" (2011)	"Can't Shake You" (2012)

"(Kissed You) Good Night" is a song recorded by the American country music group Gloriana. Written by group member Tom Gossin with Josh Kear, it was released in October 2011 as the second single from the band's album A Thousand Miles Left Behind. It was also the group's first single release after the departure of member Cheyenne Kimball.

== Content ==
Gloriana member Tom Gossin co-wrote the song with Josh Kear, who also wrote the band's debut single "Wild at Heart". Gossin based the duet around a conversation between two girls that he overheard at a restaurant. After one of them said, "Girl, that is his job to make the first move!", Gossin said, "My ears perk up, and I was listening because I wanted to know what they had to say about it. They were like, 'It is always the guy's job. Just push her up against the wall and do it!' That became like the first [idea] that I had when I wrote with Josh."

== Critical reception ==
Matt Bjorke of Roughstock rated it four stars out of five, saying that "It's an effective telling of how a first kiss can be a nervous affair but in the end it is those nervous moments that make life worth living." Giving it four-and-a-half stars out of five, Billy Dukes of Taste of Country wrote that "there are fewer layers to get through to enjoy the song" and compared it favorably to Lady Antebellum.

== Music video ==
TK McKamy directed the song's music video, which was released in January 2012. It features actors Megan Park and Tyler Hilton, and was shot in Franklin, Tennessee.

== Charts and certifications ==
Gloriana was presented with their Platinum plaques for '(Kissed You) Good Night' for surpassing 1 million singles sold at their first fan club party in Nashville, TN on June 6, 2013.

=== Weekly charts ===
Chart (2011–2012)	Peak position
Canada Hot 100 (Billboard)	60
US Billboard Hot 100	34
US Hot Country Songs (Billboard)	2

=== Certifications ===
Region	Certification	Certified units/sales
United States (RIAA)	Platinum	1,000,000^{*}
^{*} Sales figures based on certification alone.

=== Year-end charts ===
Chart (2012)	Position
US Country Songs (Billboard)	5
