= Joshua Bassett (EP) =

2021 EP by Joshua Bassett

EP by Joshua Bassett
- Released: March 12, 2021
- Length: 19:37
- Label: Warner
- Producers: Joshua Bassett; Dallas Caton; Jake Gosling; Afterhrs; David Pramik

Joshua Bassett chronology
Joshua Bassett (2021)	Crisis / Secret / Set Me Free (2021)

Singles from Joshua Bassett
- 1. "Lie Lie Lie" Released: January 14, 2021; 2. "Only a Matter of Time" Released: January 28, 2021; 3. "Telling Myself" Released: March 12, 2021

Joshua Bassett is the debut EP by American singer-songwriter Joshua Bassett, released on March 12, 2021, through Warner Records.

The EP was supported by the release of three singles, "Lie Lie Lie", released on January 14, "Only a Matter of Time", released on January 28, and "Telling Myself", released on March 12, 2021.

== Background and conception ==
In early 2020, Bassett signed with talent and entertainment company United Talent Agency, as well as signed a recording contract with Warner Bros. Records. after signing with Warner Bros. Records, He released his debut single, "Common Sense", on music platforms on April 3, 2020. Later that month, Bassett appeared in the television special, The Disney Family Singalong, in which he performed "We're All In This Together" from High School Musical alongside the film's cast as well as cast members from the Zombies and Descendants franchises. Bassett's second single, "Anyone Else", was released on July 16, 2020. In August 2020, he was a guest star participant on Nickelodeon's reality game series Unfiltered. In October 2020, in an interview, Bassett revealed that he had worked on his six track debut EP which would be released soon. That same month, he revealed in an interview with Good Morning America that his debut EP would be released in early 2021.

On January 14, 2021, Bassett released "Lie Lie Lie", the lead single from his then-upcoming debut EP, with a R3hab remix and an acoustic piano version released the following month. The song peaked in the top thirty on the US Bubbling Under Hot 100 and in the top ninety on the OOC UK Singles, becoming his first entry on both charts. Bassett had shared a snippet of the song on Instagram under the title, "I Know", back in late 2019 when the song had not entered production. He followed it up with the second single from his EP, "Only a Matter Of Time", released on January 28, 2021. In February 2021, Limbo, a short film that he had filmed back in 2015, was released on Amazon Prime Video and Vimeo on Demand. Despite the delayed release, the short film marked his film debut. Bassett played Caleb, an estranged young boy who reconnects with his father, the latter who is on a journey of self-reflection. Later that month, he revealed the track listing, cover art, and release date of his EP.

== Release ==
On March 12, 2021, Bassett's self-titled debut EP was released. He wrote, co-produced five of six tracks in the record, and played six instruments throughout the body of work. The EP's subject matter centers on heartbreak, love, regret, and betrayal.

== Track listing ==
Joshua Bassett track listing
No.	Title	Writer(s)	Producer(s)	Length
1.	"Sorry"	Joshua Bassett	Bassett; Dallas Caton	3:22
2.	"Do It All Again"	Bassett	Bassett; Jake Gosling	3:31
3.	"Lie Lie Lie"	Bassett	Afterhrs	2:56
4.	"Only a Matter of Time"	Bassett; Amy Victoria Wadge	Bassett; Gosling	3:14
5.	"Telling Myself"	Bassett; David Pramik; Caroline Pennell	Bassett; Caton; Pramik	2:49
6.	"Heaven Is You"	Bassett; Sabrina Carpenter	Bassett; Gosling	3:43
Total length:				19:37

== Personnel ==
Credits adapted from Tidal.

=== Musicians ===
- Joshua Bassett – vocals (all tracks), acoustic guitar (2, 4), background vocals (1–2, 4, 6), backing vocals (2, 4), bass (1), drums (5–6), electric guitar (4, 6), guitar (1, 3, 5), live bass (5), percussion (2, 5), piano (1–2, 4–6), programming (2), strings (2), synthesizer programming (1)
- Dallas Caton – drum programming (1), electric guitar (5), horns synthesizer (5), percussion (5), programming (5), synth bass (5) synthesizer programming (1, 5), talk box (5)
- Matt Brettle – bass guitar (2, 4, 6), electric guitar (2, 6), programming (2, 4, 6)
- Jake Gosling – programming (2, 4, 6), synthesizer (4, 6)
- Andrew Haas – background vocals (3), bass (3), guitar (3), keyboards (3), programming (3)
- Ian Franzino – background vocals (3), keyboards (3), programming (3)
- Caroline Pennell – background vocals (5)
- David Pramik – percussion (5), piano (5)

=== Technical ===
- Dale Becker – mastering (all tracks)
- Mark Stent – mixing (all tracks)
- Matt Wolach – assistant mixer (1–4, 6)
- Matt Brettle – engineering (2), recording engineering (4, 6)
- Dallas Caton – recording engineering (1)
- Jake Gosling – recording engineering (2)
- Andrew Haas – recording engineering (3)
- Ian Franzino – recording engineering (3)
- Karl Wingate – recording engineering (4, 6)
- Andy Seltzer – additional engineering (2)
- Nikil Suresh – assistant engineering (2)
- Jeff Gunnell – assistant engineering (3)

== Charts ==
Weekly chart performance for Joshua Bassett
Chart (2021)	Peak position
Heatseekers Albums	19

== Release history ==
Release history and formats for Joshua Bassett
Region	Date	Format(s)	Label	Ref.
Various	March 12, 2021	Digital download; streaming	Warner	
