= TK McKamy =

American music and commercial video director

- Born: Thomas Knox McKamy, III; Stone Mountain, Georgia, U.S.
- Occupation: Film Director / Cinematographer / Creative Consultant
- Spouse: Marielle Jaffe (m. 2016)

TK McKamy is an American film director, screenwriter, and editor known for directing music videos.

Thomas Knox McKamy III was born in Stone Mountain, Georgia and raised in the small town of Nicholasville, Kentucky. The son of Knox and Lynn McKamy and the brother to Holly. An athlete, TK traveled the U.S. playing competitive soccer and baseball. He attended East Jessamine High School.

== Music videos ==
Year	Video	Artist
2009	"Free Falling" short	Ben Rector
2010	"Miracles"	Newsboys
2010	"Lift Up Your Face"	Third Day
2010	"Invasion (Hero)"	Trip Lee ft. Jai
2011	"(Kissed You) Good Night"	Gloriana
2011	"Break Free"	Committed
2011	"Wanna Take You Home"	Gloriana
2011	"Chasing Stardust"	Matt Mason
2011	"Just Like You"	Lecrae
2011	"Can't Shut Up"	Anthem Lights
2012	"Telescope"	Hayden Panettiere
2012	"Holly Jolly Christmas"	Lady Antebellum
2012	"Moments Like This"	Dean Alexander
2012	"Can't Shake You"	Gloriana
2012	"Crying on a Suitcase"	Casey James
2012	"You're All that Matters to Me"	Miss Willie Brown
2012	"You Still Got It"	Darryl Worley
2012	"Last Day of Summer"	Action Item
2013	"Get Me Some of That"	Thomas Rhett
2013	"It Ain't the Whiskey"	Gary Allan
2013	"It Goes Like This"	Thomas Rhett
2014	"Skydive"	O-Town
2014	"Make Me Wanna"	Thomas Rhett
2014	"God Made Girls"	RaeLynn
2014	"Girl in a Country Song"	Maddie & Tae
2015	"Shut Up and Fish"	Maddie & Tae
2015	"Confession"	Florida Georgia Line
2015	"Die a Happy Man"	Thomas Rhett
2015	"The Driver"	Charles Kelley with Dierks Bentley and Eric Paslay
2015	"Move On"	Clare Dunn
2015	"Long Stretch of Love"	Lady Antebellum
2015	"Crash and Burn"	Thomas Rhett
2015	"For a Boy"	RaeLynn
2015	"Chasing"	O-Town
2015	"Going Out Like That"	Reba McEntire
2016	"Thunder in the Rain"	Kane Brown
2016	"For Her"	Chris Lane
2016	"May We All"	Florida Georgia Line ft. Tim McGraw
2016	"Love Triangle"	RaeLynn
2016	"Vacation"	Thomas Rhett
2016	"All About Us"	Jordan Fisher
2016	"Summer"	Cassadee Pope
2016	"Damn Drunk"	Ronnie Dunn
2016	"H.O.L.Y."	Florida Georgia Line
2016	"Someone to Take Your Place"	Tara Thompson
2016	"Next Boyfriend"	Lauren Alaina
2016	"Fix"	Chris Lane
2017	"Craving You"	Thomas Rhett ft. Maren Morris
2017	"Marry Me"	Thomas Rhett
2017	"Smooth"	Florida Georgia Line
2017	"Mess"	Jordan Fisher
2017	"Happens Like That"	Granger Smith
2017	"The Way I Talk"	Morgan Wallen
2017	"God, Your Mama, and Me"	Florida Georgia Line ft. Backstreet Boys
2018	"Straight to Hell"	Darius Rucker
2018	"Burn Out"	Midland
2018	"Rocket Man"	Little Big Town
2018	"Rich"	Maren Morris
2018	"Don't Get Better Than That"	LoCash
	"Hopeless Romantic"	Wiz Khalifa ft Swae Lee
2020	"That’s Why I Love Dirt Roads"	Granger Smith
2021	"Drinkin' Beer. Talkin' God. Amen."	Chase Rice ft. Florida Georgia Line
2021	"Chasing After You"	Ryan Hurd & Maren Morris
2021	"Hate You Like I Love You"	Granger Smith
2025	Somewhere Over Laredo	Lainey Wilson
	"Let It Snow"	Lainey Wilson ft Bing Crosby
	"Overdrive"	Thomas Rhett
	"After All The Bars Are Closed"	Thomas Rhett

== Films ==
Year	Title	Notes
2011	October Baby	Associate producer
2015	23-61	Short film; writer and producer
