= Trouble (Gloriana song) =

Single by Gloriana

from the album Three
- Released: October 27, 2014
- Genre: Country
- Length: 3:10
- Label: Emblem/Warner Bros. Nashville
- Songwriter(s): Rachel Reinert; Mike Gossin; Ross Copperman; Jon Nite
- Producer(s): Matt Serletic

Gloriana singles chronology
"Best Night Ever" (2014)	"Trouble" (2014)

"Trouble" is a song recorded by American country music group Gloriana. The song was written by group members Rachel Reinert and Mike Gossin with Ross Copperman and Jon Nite. It was released on October 27, 2014 as the first and only single from Gloriana's third studio album, Three. It is also the final single from the band before the band split in 2017.

== Critical reception ==
Taste of Country reviewed "Trouble" favorably, saying that "the song is sassier than anything they’ve come with previously — the group look to be all-in with Reinert in charge." Kevin John Coyne of Country Universe gave the song a "B−", writing that "the male cheerleader section shows up about halfway through trouble, breaking the mood in a song that had done a decent job establishing tension, thanks to a sparser than usual production and a bluesy vocal from lead vocalist Rachel Reinert."

== Chart performance ==
"Trouble" debuted at number 57 on the U.S. Billboard Country Airplay chart for the week of November 8, 2014. It also debuted at number 45 on the U.S. Billboard Hot Country Songs chart for the week of January 17, 2015. The song became a minor hit peaking at 24 on the U.S Billboard Country Airplay while peaking at 36 on the U.S Hot Country Songs in mid-May.

== Music video ==
The music video was directed by Sean Hagwell and premiered in June 2015.

== Charts ==
=== Weekly charts ===
Chart (2014–2015)	Peak position
US Country Airplay (Billboard)	24
US Hot Country Songs (Billboard)	36

=== Year-end charts ===
Chart (2015)	Position
US Country Airplay (Billboard)	79
US Hot Country Songs (Billboard)	97
