= Elect the Dead =

Studio album by Serj Tankian
- Released: October 22, 2007
- Recorded: Serjical Strike Dungeons, The Pass (Los Angeles)
- Genres: Alternative rock; hard rock; heavy metal
- Length: 45:03
- Labels: Reprise; Serjical Strike
- Producer: Serj Tankian

Serj Tankian chronology
Serart (2003)	Elect the Dead (2007)	Lie Lie Live (2008)

Serj Tankian studio album chronology
Elect the Dead (2007)	Imperfect Harmonies (2010)

Alternative cover

Special edition cover

Singles from Elect the Dead
- 1. "The Unthinking Majority" Released: July 30, 2007; 2. "Empty Walls" Released: September 10, 2007; 3. "Lie Lie Lie" Released: December 24, 2007; 4. "Sky Is Over" Released: January 16, 2008

Professional ratings
Aggregate scores
Source	Rating
Metacritic	68/100
Review scores
Source	Rating
AbsolutePunk	(69%)
AllMusic	4/5 stars
Billboard	(favorable)
Robert Christgau	(dud)
IGN	(7.1/10)
Kerrang!	4/5 stars
Music Emissions	4.5/5 stars
NME	(October 27, 2007, p.39)
Rolling Stone	2.5/5 stars
The Guardian	3/5 stars

Elect the Dead is the debut solo studio album by Armenian-American rock musician Serj Tankian. It was released on October 22, 2007, through Reprise Records and Tankian's Serjical Strike Records. Alongside Tankian appears Armenian-American coloratura Ani Maldjian, drummers John Dolmayan (Tankian's System of a Down bandmate) and Brain, guitarist and bassist Dan Monti, as well as a string section featuring Antonio Pontarelli.

== Production ==
Tankian, best known for being the lead singer of the heavy metal band System of a Down, stated that some of the songs on Elect the Dead were new, and others had developed earlier. An acoustic version of "Blue" was released on the album's special edition bonus disc; the original version appeared on System of a Down's fourth demo tape in 1997, but no other recordings of the song were known to exist. The title track was also recorded by System of a Down during the recording sessions for their 2005 albums Mezmerize and Hypnotize, though this version remains unreleased.

It's very wide sounding — lots of different sounding instruments. The excitement I had making this record was the same excitement I had making the first System record.

— Serj Tankian, in an interview with Billboard.com

== Marketing and touring ==
The initial single from the album was a two-track promo including "Empty Walls" and "The Unthinking Majority", released on September 10, 2007. Tankian immediately appeared on MTV's "You Rock the Deuce" program. Meanwhile, a music video of "Feed Us" was released in Sweden and on UK MTV. The album was released on October 22, 2007, and opened at number 4 with 66,000 US units sold according to the Billboard 200 trade listing. By September 2010, the album had sold 319,000 copies total.

Music videos of the album's songs were each filmed by discrete directors. Tankian revealed: "I asked each of the directors for their visual interpretation of my work. They were asked not to write treatments and that they could make whatever they liked. The results have been overwhelmingly amazing". Initially, some videos were released as limited edition premiums. All videos (with exception of "Money") were later freely offered on Tankian's website and his YouTube channel. Some of these "official videos" were alternate versions released one version at a time, suggesting an incrementally evolving narrative.

Collectible versions of the album include an instrumental disc offered by Reprise and Serjical Strike Records, and the "final master" from Reprise intended for specific journalists and reviewers. That embargoed disc was labeled "Smart Talk" [a coded reference to the artist's own name]. Previously an undated, un-mastered 'Smart Talk' promo featured these same 'final versions' of the songs, but the sequence of tracks ten and eleven was juxtaposed.

An Elect the Dead tour commenced October 12, 2007, at Chicago's Vic Theater. Tankian cautioned fans this production featured a new band, Flying Cunts of Chaos (a.k.a. the F.C.C.), which was not promoting the System of a Down.

In 2009, Tankian did a symphonic tour with an orchestra in order to perform symphonic renditions of most of the songs from Elect the Dead. A recording of this tour titled Elect the Dead Symphony was released on February 23, 2010, in the US.

== Track listing ==
All tracks are written by Serj Tankian.

No.	Title	Length
1.	"Empty Walls"	3:49
2.	"The Unthinking Majority"	3:46
3.	"Money"	3:53
4.	"Feed Us"	4:31
5.	"Saving Us"	4:41
6.	"Sky Is Over"	2:57
7.	"Baby"	3:31
8.	"Honking Antelope"	3:50
9.	"Lie Lie Lie"	3:33
10.	"Praise the Lord and Pass the Ammunition"	4:23
11.	"Beethoven's Cunt"	3:13
12.	"Elect the Dead"	2:54
Total length:		45:03

iTunes and Japanese version bonus track
No.	Title	Length
13.	"The Reverend King"	2:49
Total length:		47:52

Special edition bonus disc
No.	Title	Length
1.	"Blue"	2:45
2.	"Empty Walls" (Acoustic)	3:46
3.	"Feed Us" (Acoustic)	4:21
4.	"Falling Stars"	3:05
Total length:		14:17

== Personnel ==
- Serj Tankian: songwriting, production, engineering, guitars, bass, piano, vocals, synthesizers, drum programming, melodica, bells
- Dan Monti: engineering

Elect the Dead

- Brain: drums (1, 3–5, 7–9, 11)
- John Dolmayan: drums (2, 4–5)
- Dan Monti: drum programming (6), guitar (1–4, 6, 8, 11), bass (2, 6–9, 11), synthesizers (6)
- Diran Noubar: guitar solo (5)
- Ani Maldjian: additional vocals (5, 9)
- Cameron Stone: cello (1, 3, 4, 6, 8, 11, 12)
- Antonio Pontarelli: violin (1, 3, 4, 6, 8)
- Fabrice Favre: synthesizers (6)
- Krish Sharma: drum engineer
- Bo Joe: Assistant drum engineer
- Sako Karaian: drum technician
- Neal Avron: mixing
- Nicholas Fournier: mix assistant

Special edition bonus disc

- Antonio Pontarelli: violin (2–4)
- Cameron Stone: cello (2–4)
- Dan Monti: additional guitars (4)
- John Dolmayan: drums (4)
- Thom Russo: engineering (1)
- Serj Tankian & Dan Monti: mixing (1–3)
- Krish Sharma: drum engineer (4)
- Bo Joe: assistant drum engineer (4)
- Sako Karaian: drum technician (4)
- Neal Avron: mixing (4)
- Nicholas Fournier: mix assistant (4)

- Craig Aaronson & George Tonikian: A&R
- Sako Shahinian: artwork, album packaging design
- Keith Aazami: digipack album packaging design
- Greg Watermann: photography

== Charts ==
Chart (2007)	Peak position
Australian Albums (ARIA)	19
Austrian Albums (Ö3 Austria)	5
Belgian Albums (Ultratop Flanders)	64
Belgian Albums (Ultratop Wallonia)	50
Canadian Albums (Billboard)	3
Dutch Albums (Album Top 100)	45
Finnish Albums (Suomen virallinen lista)	12
French Albums (SNEP)	23
German Albums (Offizielle Top 100)	10
Italian Albums (FIMI)	43
Japanese Album Charts (Oricon)	55
New Zealand Albums (RMNZ)	14
Scottish Albums (Official Charts)	33
Swedish Albums (Sverigetopplistan)	36
Swiss Albums (Schweizer Hitparade)	11
UK Albums (OCC)	26
US Billboard 200	4
