= Wanna Take You Home =

Single by Gloriana

from the album A Thousand Miles Left Behind
- Released: March 28, 2011
- Genre: Country
- Length: 3:38
- Label: Emblem/Warner Bros.
- Songwriters: Tom Gossin; Matt Serletic; Wendell Mobley
- Producer: Matt Serletic

Gloriana singles chronology
"The World Is Ours Tonight" (2010)	"Wanna Take You Home" (2011)	"(Kissed You) Good Night" (2011)

"Wanna Take You Home" is a song recorded by American country music group Gloriana, written by band member Tom Gossin with Matt Serletic and Wendell Mobley. It was released in March 2011 as the first single from the album A Thousand Miles Left Behind. It is the band's last single to feature member Cheyenne Kimball.

== Content ==
Band member Tom Gossin wrote the song with Matt Serletic and Wendell Mobley. Gossin said that he did not have any lyrics when he began writing with the two, and that the idea came once Gossin recalled seeing fans dance in the audience whenever the band performed "Wild at Heart".

== Critical reception ==
Giving it four stars out of five, Bobby Peacock of Roughstock praised the "punchy groove, with plenty of banjo and steel fills".

== Music video ==
The video was the first major music video for director TK McKamy. It was filmed immediately before Cheyenne Kimball left the group. It shows the group performing the song at a huge evening barn party, surrounded by many fans.

== Chart performance ==
Chart (2011)	Peak position
US Hot Country Songs (Billboard)	34
