= Gloriana (band) =

American country music band (2008–2017)

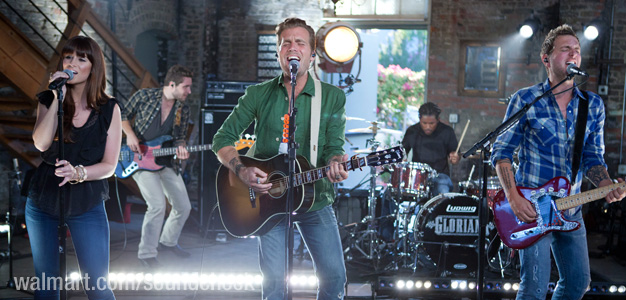
- Gloriana at Walmart Soundcheck, August 2012. L-R: Rachel Reinert, Tom Gossin, Mike Gossin

Background information
- Origin: Nashville, Tennessee, U.S.
- Genres: Country
- Years active: 2008–2017
- Labels: Emblem; Reprise Nashville; Warner Bros. Nashville
- Past members: Cheyenne Kimball; Rachel Reinert; Mike Gossin; Tom Gossin
- Website: www.gloriana.com

Gloriana was an American country music group founded in 2008 by Cheyenne Kimball (vocals, mandolin), Rachel Reinert (vocals), and brothers Tom Gossin (vocals, guitar) and Mike Gossin (vocals, guitar). Prior to the group's foundation, Kimball recorded as a solo artist. The original lineup recorded one self-titled album for Emblem/Reprise Records in 2009, which included their first chart hit, "Wild at Heart". Kimball left before the release of the band's second album A Thousand Miles Left Behind, which produced their highest-charting single, "(Kissed You) Good Night", along with the top 20 "Can't Shake You". After a third album, Three, Reinert left as well, effectively disbanding the group.

== History ==
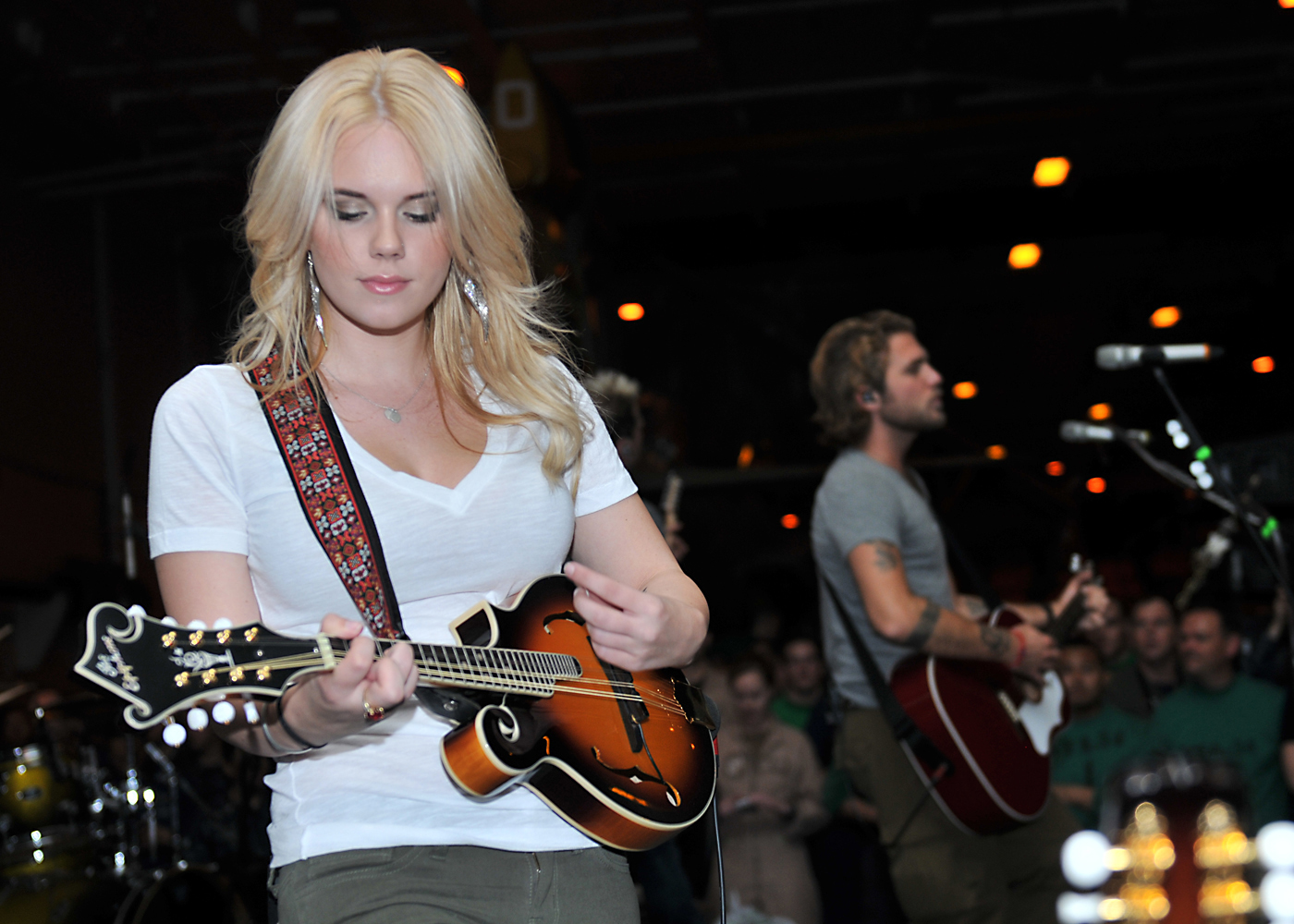
Cheyenne Kimball, pictured here in 2010, was a vocalist and mandolinist in the group for their debut album.

Brothers Tom and Mike Gossin were born in Utica, New York. They both took classical piano lessons from age 5. At 10, Tom began studying jazz with a local jazz musician and at 12, he began to play the guitar. Tom, along with third Gossin brother Stephen, founded their own band "Oblique" in high school. Stephen and Tom later moved to Wilmington, North Carolina together, where they attended University of North Carolina at Wilmington, with Tom majoring in guitar. After a professor suggested that he pursue songwriting and performing, Tom dropped out of the university and started playing music and selling independent records at gigs he played. Mike learned drums at age 8 and, like Tom, started playing guitar at 12. He moved to Wilmington after high school to join Tom there. He joined a group with Tom and Stephen during which time they filmed a reality series that did not last long. Tom and Mike moved to Nashville, Tennessee, where they began performing as a duo.

Rachel Reinert was born in Sarasota, Florida, and lived in Marietta, Georgia before moving to Santa Ana, California with her family at age 6. She attended the Orange County School of the Arts, a charter performing arts school, where she studied musical theatre from 7th to 10th grade. She started playing the guitar and turning her poetry into songs at age 14. With a teacher's help, she began recording demos, and was signed to a publishing deal out of Nashville at age 15. She graduated high school through independent study and moved to Nashville when she turned 16, and was working on her songwriting skills when she met the Gossins, who found her through her MySpace page.

The group's fourth and final member, Cheyenne Kimball, was born in Jacksonville, North Carolina but raised in Frisco, Texas. A performer by age 10, she entered the television talent show America's Most Talented Kid, and won the show's top honor at age 12. One year after her win, Kimball recorded a solo album on Epic Records. This album included songs that she had written with John Rich of Big & Rich, whom she met after a trip to Nashville. When Cheyenne was in her late teens she had a reality show on MTV that lasted one season. She joined the Gossin brothers and Reinert after meeting them in a nightclub, and the four members began writing songs and performing together.

=== 2008–2010: Gloriana ===
Once the four members of Gloriana were in place, they began recording demos, and sent one to Emblem Records, a label owned by Matt Serletic, a record producer who has worked with Matchbox 20. The four members worked with Serletic, and Nashville songwriters such as Jeffrey Steele, Brett James and Wayne Kirkpatrick, among others. By February the group had signed with the label but had not yet come up with a name.

In early 2009, the group released its debut single "Wild at Heart", which Serletic wrote with Josh Kear and Stephanie Bentley, another former Epic artist. It became the highest-selling country music debut single of 2009. The group also signed to Taylor Swift's 2009-2010 Fearless tour. In May 2009, Gloriana released a four-song digital EP, comprising "Wild at Heart" and three other songs from the album. On August 4, 2009, the band released its self-titled debut, which peaked at No. 2 on Top Country Albums and No. 3 on the Billboard 200, shortly before "Wild at Heart" peaked at No. 15. The album's second single, "How Far Do You Wanna Go?", was released in September. The band won the American Music Award's Breakthrough Artist of the Year in 2009. It was announced on March 16, 2010 that the group had won the 2010 Academy of Country Music's Top New Vocal Group award. On August 18, 2010, "Wild at Heart" was certified Gold by the RIAA.

A third single, "The World Is Ours Tonight," debuted in early 2010. It was included on a March 2010 reissue of the band's debut album.

=== 2011–2013: A Thousand Miles Left Behind ===
In early 2011, the group announced the release of a new single, "Wanna Take You Home", which acted as the lead-off single to their second studio album, A Thousand Miles Left Behind. "Wanna Take You Home" was released to country radio on March 28, 2011, and went on to become the group's fourth Top 40 hit. On July 11, 2011, Gloriana announced the departure of Cheyenne Kimball. The band found out about Kimball's plan to leave via Twitter. They continued working on their second album without Kimball, although she still appears in the "Wanna Take You Home" music video. The song's music video, directed by TK McKamy, was shot over the course of several days at a private residence outside of Nashville.

On October 4, 2011, Gloriana released their second single from the album, "(Kissed You) Good Night," on their official website. On January 13, 2012, the music video for "(Kissed You) Good Night" premiered on ABC Family. On May 20, 2012, the band performed their single "(Kissed You) Good Night" on the television show The Bachelorette. On July 31, 2012, the album was released. On September 10, 2012, the album's third single, "Can't Shake You", was released. The single was featured on the season 2 finale of The CW's Hart of Dixie with the band guest starring as themselves.

=== 2014–2017: Three ===
The group released a new single, "Best Night Ever," in February 2014, and it went on to be a minor Top 40 hit on the Billboard Country Airplay chart. It was followed later in the year by "Trouble," which reached a peak of number 24 on the Billboard Country Airplay chart and served as the lead-off single to Gloriana's third studio album, Three, which was released on June 2, 2015. The album produced no other singles, and in January 2016, Reinert announced her departure from the band.

Tom Gossin began touring as a solo artist in 2017. In mid-2018, Reinert released the solo single "Cool".

== Discography ==
=== Studio albums ===
Title	Details	Peak positions			Sales
Title	Details	US Country	US	AUS	Sales
Gloriana	Release date: August 4, 2009; Label: Emblem/Reprise/Warner Bros.; Formats: CD, music download	2	3	43	US: 235,000
A Thousand Miles Left Behind	Release date: July 31, 2012; Label: Emblem/Warner Bros.; Formats: CD, music download	2	11	—	US: 118,000
Three	Release date: June 2, 2015; Label: Emblem/Warner Bros.; Formats: CD, music download	13	116	—	US: 4,500
"—" denotes releases that did not chart

=== Extended plays ===
Title	Details
The Way It Goes	Release date: May 19, 2009; Label: Emblem/Warner Bros.; Formats: CD, music download

=== Singles ===
Year	Single	Peak positions					Certifications	Album
Year	Single	US Country Songs	US Country Airplay	US	CAN Country	CAN	Certifications	Album
2009	"Wild at Heart"	15		53	34	—	US: Gold	Gloriana
2009	"How Far Do You Wanna Go?"	36		—	37	—		Gloriana
2010	"The World Is Ours Tonight"	37		—	—	—		Gloriana
2011	"Wanna Take You Home"	34		—	—	—		A Thousand Miles Left Behind
2011	"(Kissed You) Good Night"	2		34	6	60	US: Platinum	A Thousand Miles Left Behind
2012	"Can't Shake You"	20	16	83	—	—		A Thousand Miles Left Behind
2014	"Best Night Ever"	46	37	—	—	—		Non-album single
2014	"Trouble"	36	24	—	—	—		Three

=== Music videos ===
Year	Video	Director
2009	"Wild at Heart"	Elliott Lester
2009	"The Way It Goes"	Chad Denning
2009	"How Far Do You Wanna Go?"	Kristin Barlowe
2009	"Silent Night"	Eric Welch
2010	"The World Is Ours Tonight"	Shawn Robbins
2011	"Wanna Take You Home"	TK McKamy
2011	"(Kissed You) Good Night"	TK McKamy
2012	"Can't Shake You"	TK McKamy
2015	"Trouble"	Sean Hagwell

== Awards and nominations ==
Year	Association	Category	Result
2009	CMT Music Awards	Group Video of the Year — "Wild at Heart"	Nominated
2009	CMT Music Awards	USA Weekend Breakthrough Video of the Year — "Wild at Heart"	Nominated
2009	CMT Music Awards	Nationwide On Your Side Award	Won
2009	American Music Awards	Breakthrough Artist of the Year	Won
2010	Academy of Country Music Awards	Top New Vocal Group	Won
2010	Academy of Country Music Awards	Top New Artist	Nominated
2010	CMT Music Awards	Group Video of the Year - How Far Do You Wanna Go?	Nominated
2010	Teen Choice Awards	Choice Country Group	Nominated
2012	American Country Awards	Artist of the Year: Breakthrough	Nominated
2012	American Country Awards	Single of the Year: Breakthrough — "(Kissed You) Good Night"	Nominated
2012	American Country Awards	Music Video of the Year: Group or Collaboration — "(Kissed You) Good Night"	Nominated
