= John Proulx =

American jazz pianist, vocalist, and composer

John Proulx is a jazz pianist, vocalist, educator, and composer based in Los Angeles, California. His singing style has elicited comparisons with a young Chet Baker. He is a recording artist with four albums to his credit. His most recent album, Say It, came out in 2018 on the ArtistShare label, and features Chuck Berghofer on bass, Joe LaBarbera on drums, Larry Koonse on guitar, Bob Sheppard on sax, with special guest, Melissa Manchester and string quartet arrangements by Alan Broadbent. As an educator, John has taught jazz piano and voice at Cal State Long Beach, Cal State Fullerton, Cal Poly Pomona, and Azusa Pacific University. He has a Bachelor’s degree in jazz piano performance from Roosevelt University in Chicago and a Master’s Degree in jazz vocal performance from Western Michigan University in Kalamazoo, Michigan. Currently, John is working for a jazz piano teaching website, pianowithjonny.com where he creates online courses and videos for the subscription-based community.

== Career ==
John Proulx is from Grand Rapids, Michigan. The son of two musicians, Mark and Suzanne Proulx, he began his formal musical education at the age of 3 on Suzuki violin, but quickly switched to classical piano lessons. His grandfather, Clyde Proulx, was a jazz guitarist who introduced him to the world of jazz.

In 1994 Proulx graduated from Catholic Central High School. After high school, he attended Aquinas College in Grand Rapids for two years. He then moved to Chicago where he studied at Roosevelt University's Chicago School of Performing Arts. In 2001, Proulx moved to Los Angeles to further his musical pursuits.

Proulx has composed songs for jazz artists Nancy Wilson, Mary Stallings, Melissa Manchester, Al Jarreau, and Greg Walker. Deana Martin recorded his song "Stuck in a Dream with Me" on her 2013 album Destination Moon. Proulx teamed with Melissa Manchester, and Al Jarreau for the song, "Big Light" on Manchester's 2015 album, You Gotta Love the Life.

In addition to his performing career, Proulx is also an experienced educator, having taught for several years at Cal State Long Beach, Cal State Fullerton, Cal Poly Pomona, and Azusa Pacific University. Currently, John works for an online piano teaching website, pianowithjonny.com, where he creates online course and videos for the subscription-based community.

John has four albums to his credit: “Moon and Sand”, “Baker’s Dozen”, “The Best Thing For You”, and “Say It”.

== Awards ==
Proulx composed the song "These Golden Years" with lyricist D. Channsin Berry for Nancy Wilson’s 2006 album Turned to Blue, which won the 2007 Grammy Award for Best Jazz Vocal Album.

Proulx received his Bachelor’s Degree in Jazz Piano Performance from Roosevelt University Chicago in 1999 and his Master’s Degree in Jazz Vocal Performance from Western Michigan University in Kalamazoo, Michigan in 2019.

== Albums ==
- Moon and Sand - 2006
- Bakers Dozen (Remembering Chet Baker) - 2009
- The Best Thing for You - 2012
- Say It - 2018
