= Antonio Pontarelli =

American singer-songwriter and violinist

- Born: April 1, 1991 (age 35); Westlake Village, California, U.S.
- Occupations: Singer-songwriter, record producer, musician, composer
- Years active: 2007–present
- Website: www.antoniopontarelli.com

Antonio Pontarelli (born April 1, 1991), is an American singer-songwriter and rock violinist. Pontarelli has played across the United States and abroad, performed as a soloist at Carnegie Hall and Lincoln Center, and collaborated with artists such as Serj Tankian and Jethro Tull. He has won several competitions and awards including PAX TV's 2004 competition show "America's Most Talented Kid". In 2012, Pontarelli was hired by FremantleMedia to compose music for The Pet Collective, one of Google's Original 100 YouTube Channels; videos with his music have combined views of over 31 million as of 2016.

== Personal life ==
He was born in Westlake Village, California and raised in Temecula, California. He attended Hillcrest Academy and was then home-schooled to accommodate his music career and graduated from the University of Southern California in 2011. In 2014, Pontarelli moved to Park City, Utah. He performed at private events during the 2015 Sundance Film Festival and continues to play local venues throughout the state.

== Career ==
Pontarelli was classically trained on the violin from age four. In the years that followed, Pontarelli played in local orchestras and youth violin competitions and from 2003 to 2005, he was concertmaster of the San Diego Youth Symphonic Orchestra. While continuing his classical education, Pontarelli experimented with other genres and improvisation, performing with jazz, country, blues, world, and rock musicians. He appeared on national television in 2004, winning the Grand Champion title of PAX TV's competition show America's Most Talented Kid. After gaining recognition as a rock violinist, Pontarelli played throughout Southern California, performing with Jethro Tull, Mark O'Connor, Rene Paulo, David Benoit, and Melissa Manchester among others. His performances continued across the United States as a soloist performing Gershwin's "Summertime" at Carnegie Hall in 2010 followed by another solo performance in 2011 at Lincoln Center, and abroad at the 2009 Jakarta International Java Jazz Festival. In 2006 Pontarelli began writing and recording original music for a demo EP. His co-writers on the album included Toby Gad, Dan Monti, Tommy Henriksen, and Wizardz of Oz. In addition to his own music, he recorded violins on Serj Tankian's debut solo album Elect the Dead in 2007 and on Melissa Manchester's 2015 album You Gotta Love the Life. Pontarelli has also composed music for film and television, and in 2012, was hired by FremantleMedia to produce music for one of Google's Original 100 YouTube Channels called "The Pet Collective".
