= Three (Gloriana album) =

Studio album by Gloriana
- Released: June 2, 2015
- Genre: Country
- Label: Emblem/Warner Bros. Nashville
- Producer: Matt Serletic

Gloriana chronology
A Thousand Miles Left Behind (2012)	Three (2015)

Singles from Three
- 1. "Trouble" Released: October 27, 2014

Three is the third and final studio album by American country music group Gloriana. It was released on June 2, 2015 via Emblem Music Group/Warner Bros. Records. The album was produced by Matt Serletic. It includes the top 25 single "Trouble". This was Gloriana's final album before Rachel Reinert's departure from the band and before splitting with their label, Warner Bros. Nashville.

== Track listing ==
No.	Title	Writer(s)	Length
1.	"Trouble"	Rachel Reinert, Mike Gossin, Jon Nite, Ross Copperman	3:10
2.	"Ain't Runnin' Outta Summer"	Tom Gossin, M. Gossin, Copperman	3:14
3.	"Are You Ready"	T. Gossin, Josh Kear	3:31
4.	"Nobody but You"	Eric Paslay, Dylan Altman, Will Hoge	3:14
5.	"It's On Tonight"	T. Gossin, M. Gossin, Danny Myrick, Rachel Proctor	3:08
6.	"Fight"	Catt Gravitt, Gerald O'Brien, John King	2:58
7.	"Wanna Get to Know You"	Reinert, T. Gossin, Copperman	3:20
8.	"Let's Take a Shot"	M. Gossin, Reinert, Myrick	3:05
9.	"Get Back That Goodbye"	Reinert, M. Gossin, Nite, Jimmy Robbins	3:44
10.	"Lighters"	T. Gossin, Reinert, Copperman	3:41
11.	"It Won't Let Go"	M. Gossin, T. Gossin, Myrick	3:56
12.	"My Somebody"	Lucie Silvas, Jon Green, Jeremy Spillman	3:00

== Personnel ==
Gloriana

- Mike Gossin - vocals
- Tom Gossin - vocals
- Rachel Reinert - vocals

Additional musicians

- Alex Arias - programming
- Tom Bukovac - electric guitar (except "It's On Tonight" and "Wanna Get to Know You")
- Dan Dugmore - pedal steel guitar, lap steel guitar
- Aubrey Haynie - fiddle, mandolin
- Danny Myrick - piano on "It's On Tonight"
- Tim Pierce - acoustic and electric guitars on "It's On Tonight"
- Matt Serletic - keyboards, programming, percussion, bass guitar (on "It's On Tonight"), Hammond B-3 organ, banjo, Wurlitzer piano
- Jimmie Lee Sloas - bass guitar (except "It's On Tonight")
- Ilya Toshinsky - banjo, acoustic guitar, mandolin, washboard
- Alexander Julius Wright - additional bass guitar on "It's On Tonight"

Additional vocalists

- Alex Arias - on "Are You Ready"
- Kevin Luu, F. Reid Shippen - on "Trouble"
- Danny Myrick - on "It's On Tonight"
- Patrick Woodward, Andy Martin, Ricky Kovac, Tony Solis, Tyler Jewell, Catt Gravitt, Steve Gossin, Rick Gossin - on "Fight"
- Sfara Bake, Tony Solis, Bunny Knutson, Andy Martin, Davidicus Schacher - on "Let's Take a Shot"
- Bunny Knutson - on "Lighters"

Strings on "Nobody but You"

- Mocja Rukavina, Matjaz Porvone, Matjaz Zizek, Marija Simec, Jelena Sarc, Ajda Kralj, Barbara Fanedl, Beti Bratina - violins
- Marjeta Skrjanc, Kristina Ramsak Spilar, Simona Skvarca - violas
- Gordana Keller Petrej, Petra Gacnic Greblo - cellos
- Mateja Murn Zorko - contrabass

Technical

- Alex Arias - engineering
- Tom Freitag - engineering
- Rok Golob - conductor on "Nobody but You"
- Ryan Hewitt - engineering
- Ted Jensen - mastering
- Chris Lord-Alge - mixing
- Nigel Lundemo - engineering
- Tomaz Maras - string engineer on "Nobody but You"
- Matt Serletic - production; string arrangement on "Nobody but You"
- F. Reid Shippen - engineering

== Chart performance ==
The album debuted at No. 13 on the Top Country Albums chart, and Billboard 200 at 116, selling 4,500 for the week ending June 7, 2015.

=== Album ===
Chart (2015)	Peak position
US Billboard 200	116
US Top Country Albums (Billboard)	13

=== Singles ===
Year	Single	Peak chart positions	
Year	Single	US Country	US Country Airplay
2014	"Trouble"	36	24
