= When I Look Down That Road =

Studio album by Melissa Manchester
- Released: March 9, 2004
- Studio: Blue Moon Studios (Agoura Hills, California); Full Circle Production Studios (Woodland Hills, California); NGS Productions (Montecito, California); Carson Center at Johnson County Community College (Overland Park, Kansas)
- Genre: Pop; Rock
- Length: 49:24
- Label: Koch
- Producer: Kevin DeRemer; Stephan Oberhoff

Melissa Manchester chronology
I Sent a Letter to My Love (1998)	When I Look Down That Road (2004)	You Gotta Love the Life (2015)

When I Look Down That Road is an album by Melissa Manchester, released in 2004.

== Track listing ==
All songs written by Melissa Manchester, except where noted.

1. "I'll Know You By Your Heart" (Melissa Manchester, Sharon Vaughn) – 4:35
2. "Angels Dancing" (Manchester, Jeff Silbar) – 5:07
3. "Bend" (Manchester, Wendy Lands) – 4:20
4. "When Paris Was a Woman (According To Alice – 1928)" – 5:24
5. "After All This Time" (Manchester, Blue Miller) – 3:51
6. "Lucky Break" (Manchester, Beth Nielsen Chapman) – 3:39
7. "When I Look Down That Road" (Manchester, Stephony Smith) – 3:09
8. "Where The Truth Lies" (Manchester, Rupert Holmes) – 4:01
9. "TYFYFIM (Thank You For Your Faith in Me)" (Manchester, Zuriani Zonneveld) – 3:47
10. "Still Myself" (Manchester, Pam Rose) – 3:38
11. "Crazy Loving You" (Manchester, Paul Williams) – 4:02
12. "A Mother's Prayer" (Manchester, Karen Taylor-Good) – 3:51
13. "It's The Light" (Bonus Track on Japanese CD) – 3:51

== Personnel ==
- Melissa Manchester – lead vocals, backing vocals (1, 2, 4–11), grand piano (3, 9, 12), string arrangements (3, 4)
- Stephan Oberhoff – grand piano (1, 5), acoustic guitar (1–3, 5–11), electric guitar (1, 2, 5, 9–11), bass programming (1, 2, 4–6, 8, 9, 11), additional percussion (1, 2, 11), drum programming (2, 4–6, 8, 9, 11), pump organ (3, 6, 7, 10), bass (3, 10), harp (3), string arrangements (3, 4), synthesizers (4, 6, 8, 9), additional guitars (4), Hammond B3 organ (5), cello programming (7), percussion (8, 9), slide guitar (11)
- Peter Hume – acoustic guitar (4)
- Keb' Mo' – dobro (5), slide guitar (5)
- Richie Kotzen – electric guitar (6), backing vocals (6)
- Tom Brechtlein – drums (1, 5)
- Kevin DeRemer – drums (2), percussion (2), grand piano (5), Hammond B3 organ (5), acoustic guitar (5, 6), electric guitar (5), bass programming (5, 6), drum programming (5, 6), synthesizers (6), pump organ (6)
- Cassio Duarte – percussion (1, 4, 6, 11)
- Bara M'Boup – African percussion solo (2)
- Tollak Ollestad – harmonica (2), bass harmonica (2), backing vocals (5, 6, 9)
- Lynn Angebranndt – cello (3, 9)
- Matthew Cooker – cello (4)
- Doug Norwine – clarinet (6)

=== Production ===
- Melissa Manchester – executive producer
- Kevin DeRemer – executive producer, producer, arrangements
- Stephan Oberhoff – producer, arrangements, recording, ProTools editing
- Sjoerd Koppert – recording
- Joe Vannelli – recording, mixing
- Joe Primeau – assistant engineer
- Brian Gardner – mastering at Bernie Grundman Mastering (Hollywood, California)
- David Wilkes – A&R
- Dan O'Leary – product manager
- Jeff Gilligan – art direction
- Randee St. Nicholas – photography
