= Can't Shake You =

Single by Gloriana

from the album A Thousand Miles Left Behind
- Released: September 10, 2012
- Genre: Country
- Length: 4:27 (album version); 3:52 (radio edit)
- Label: Emblem/Warner Bros.
- Songwriters: Tom Gossin; James T. Slater; Stephanie Bentley
- Producer: Matt Serletic

Gloriana singles chronology
"(Kissed You) Good Night" (2011)	"Can't Shake You" (2012)	"Best Night Ever" (2014)

"Can't Shake You" is a song recorded by the American country music group Gloriana, released in September 2012. It was the third single and final single from their album A Thousand Miles Left Behind. Group member Tom Gossin co-wrote it with James T. Slater and Stephanie Bentley. The band performed it in an episode of the TV show Hart of Dixie.

== Content ==
"Can't Shake You" is a midtempo ballad about a male who, despite breaking up, cannot "shake" the memory of a former lover. The lyric is from the male's perspective in the first verse, which is sung by Tom Gossin, and a female perspective sung by Rachel Reinert in the second.

Slater said that he had the song's piano introduction for nearly a year before collaborating with Bentley and Gossin. He told Taste of Country that the song's idea came after recalling that an ex-girlfriend still had possessions at his house from two years before.

== Critical reception ==
Billy Dukes of Taste of Country gave the song 4 stars out of 5, saying that it "may be the most vulnerable moment" on the album. He also thought that the production and sound helped the band to distinguish its sound from that of Lady Antebellum.

== Music video ==
TK McKamy directed the song's music video, which was filmed at Silverado's bar in Nashville.

== Chart performance ==
Chart (2012–2013)	Peak position
US Billboard Hot 100	83
US Country Airplay (Billboard)	16
US Hot Country Songs (Billboard)	20

=== Year-end charts ===
Chart (2013)	Position
US Country Airplay (Billboard)	64
US Hot Country Songs (Billboard)	74
