= How Far Do You Wanna Go? =

Single by Gloriana

from the album Gloriana
- Released: September 28, 2009
- Recorded: 2008; Emblem Studios (Calabasas, CA)
- Genre: Country
- Length: 3:51 (album version); 3:31 (radio edit)
- Label: Emblem/New Revolution/Reprise/Warner Bros. Nashville
- Songwriters: Danny Myrick; Matt Serletic; Jeffrey Steele
- Producer: Matt Serletic

Gloriana singles chronology
"Wild at Heart" (2009)	"How Far Do You Wanna Go?" (2009)	"The World Is Ours Tonight" (2010)

"How Far Do You Wanna Go?" is a song recorded by American country music group Gloriana, written by Danny Myrick, Jeffrey Steele and Matt Serletic. It was released in September 2009 as the second single from the band's self-titled debut album.

== Content ==
"How Far Do You Wanna Go?" was written by Nashville songwriter Jeffrey Steele, former Western Flyer member Danny Myrick and songwriter/record producer Matt Serletic, who produced Gloriana's album. It is an up-tempo featuring band member Tom Gossin on lead vocals. In it, the male narrator states that he wishes to leave town with his lover, and asks if she is willing to do the same.

== Critical reception ==
The song was met with positive reception. Chris Neal of Country Weekly gave the song three-and-a-half stars out of five, criticizing its production but saying that it was a more energetic performance than the band's debut single "Wild at Heart." He also called the song's spoken-word bridge "inspired." Jessica Phillips of Country Standard Time said that it had "has an infectious groove that Christian group Hillsong [sic] or rocker Rick Springfield would commend." Engine 145 critic Brittney McKenna gave it a thumbs-up, saying that it was "slick, highly produced and clearly geared to a certain demographic" but "catchy and fun."

== Music video ==
A music video directed by Kristin Barlowe was released on October 19, 2009. It was shot on both a soundstage, and on location. The location shots were filmed in downtown Nashville. The soundstage was also in Nashville. The video starts with a girl, who is leaving her apartment, while her boyfriend chases her throughout the video. In between these shots, are Gloriana performing the song, with their band, on the soundstage. The video ends with the two characters finally catching up to each other. They stop, hug, and ride off again, this time together.

== Chart performance ==
The song debuted at #56 on the U.S. Billboard Hot Country Songs chart for the week of October 3, 2009. It was a minor Top 40 hit, peaking at #36 in January 2010.

Chart (2009–2010)	Peak position
US Hot Country Songs (Billboard)	36
