= Terry Wollman =

- Born: October 20, 1956 (age 69); Miami, Florida
- Origin: Miami
- Genre: Jazz
- Website: www.terrywollman.com

Terry Wollman (born October 20, 1956, in Miami, Florida) is a Billboard charting American Jazz/Pop musician. He is a music director, guitarist, producer and composer, currently living in Los Angeles, California. By the end of 2012, he has released six albums, including "Bimini (1988)," "Say Yes (1998)," "Baila (2000)", "Sleep Suite (2004)," "Buddha's Ear (2011)," "A Joyful Noise (2012)," and "Silver Collection (2014)."

== Biography ==
Terry Wollman moved to Los Angeles in 1981 after graduating from Berklee College of Music with a degree in Arranging. He quickly built a solid reputation as an in-demand music director, guitarist, producer and composer. Terry has performed with an array of artists including Billy Preston, The 5th Dimension, Wilson Phillips, Al Jarreau, Joan Baez, Joe Walsh, Keb' Mo', Little Richard, Gerald Albright and Eartha Kitt. Terry’s TV credits include stints on “Scrubs," “The Tonight Show," “The Late Show," and The Byron Allen Show. Terry's 1988 debut recording, “Bimini," a contemporary jazz collection with Joe Sample on piano, Ernie Watts on sax, received worldwide critical acclaim. His second album, “Say Yes," was released in 1998 and featured a well-known array of guest artists such as Joe Sample, Abraham Laboriel, John Robinson, Luis Conte and Michael McDonald. Moving into the pop world, Terry co-wrote and produced a high-energy dance record for the supergroup Baila, entitled “Shall We Dance?”. Soon after, Terry produced and co-wrote the uniquely themed “Sleep Suite," a musical collaboration between the arts and sciences.

“Buddha’s Ear," his fifth release, was influenced by his world travels. In his usual style, he once again brings together an all-star band. His single, "Mandela" (co-written with Keb’ Mo’), spent 5 months on Billboard’s Top 20 and hit No. 1 on Smooth Jazz Top 20 and No. 4 on the Billboard charts. "A Joyful Noise," Terry's first Christmas album, reunites his longtime friends Ricky Lawson, Abraham Laboriel, Wally Minko, and Lenny Castro to put his own unique spin on holiday classics. Special guests include Melissa Manchester, Melanie Taylor, Perla Batalla, Ellis Hall, Mindi Abair, Eric Marienthal, and John Robinson.

In 2013, he began working with Melissa Manchester on her first studio album in ten years as co-producer. The album "You Gotta Love the Life" was released January 10, 2015.

In 2017, Terry was the music director for the acclaimed 2017 documentary "If You're Not in the Obit, Eat Breakfast", narrated by Carl Reiner. He produced the songs in the film which include the original composition "Just Getting Started."

In February 2018, Terry released a new single, "No Problem", which immediately reached #1 most added on Billboard's Smooth Jazz chart, Smoothjazz.com, and Radio Wave Internet Airplay.

When not in the studio or on the road, Terry is the host of the radio show "Making it With Terry Wollman" on Entertalk Radio.

== Discography ==
=== Studio albums ===
- Bimini (1988)
- Say Yes (1998)
- Baila (2000)
- Sleep Suite (2004)
- Buddha's Ear (2011)
- A Joyful Noise (2012)

=== Collections ===
- Silver Collection (2014)
