= The World Is Ours Tonight =

Single by Gloriana

from the album Gloriana
- Released: February 8, 2010
- Genre: Country, country pop
- Length: 3:33
- Label: Emblem Records; Reprise Nashville; Warner Bros. Nashville
- Songwriters: Jess Cates; Lindy Robbins; Matt Serletic
- Producer: Matt Serletic

Gloriana singles chronology
"How Far Do You Wanna Go?" (2009)	"The World Is Ours Tonight" (2010)	"Wanna Take You Home" (2011)

"The World Is Ours Tonight" is a song recorded by American country music group Gloriana for the 2010 Winter Olympics. Written by Jess Cates, Lindy Robbins and the band's producer, Matt Serletic, it was issued as a single in March 2010. All proceeds from the single went to Team USA.

The song debuted on the country music charts in March 2010, peaking at #37. It was also added to a March 2010 reissue of the band's self-titled debut album.

== Critical reception ==
Blake Boldt of Engine 145 gave the song a "thumbs-down" rating, saying that Matt Serletic's production "do[es] them few favors." Laurie Petricka of Roughstock stated the song "allows the group to showcase their unique blend of classic country with just the right touch of modern style."

== Music video ==
Shawn Robbins directed the song's music video.

== Chart performance ==
"The World Is Ours Tonight" debuted at number 51 on the Billboard Hot Country Songs chart in March 2010. It spent nine weeks on the chart, it was a minor Top 40 peaking at number 37 becoming their third Top 40.

Chart (2010)	Peak position
US Hot Country Songs (Billboard)	37
