= Lie Lie Lie (Serj Tankian song) =

Single by Serj Tankian

from the album Elect the Dead
- Released: December 24, 2007 (internet); June 2008 (radio)
- Genre: Rock
- Length: 3:34
- Label: Serjical Strike/Reprise
- Songwriter(s): Serj Tankian
- Producer(s): Serj Tankian

Serj Tankian singles chronology
"Empty Walls" (2007)	"Lie Lie Lie" (2007)	"Sky Is Over" (2008)

Music video
- "Lie Lie Lie" on YouTube

"Lie Lie Lie" is a song by Serj Tankian, released as a single from his debut solo album Elect the Dead.

The song is featured in the opening titles of NBC's Fear Itself, a horror anthology show from the creators of Masters of Horror, and can be viewed on the show's main website. Serj has performed the song alongside the Auckland Philharmonic Orchestra live in Auckland for his live album Elect the Dead Symphony.

== Music video ==
The music video is directed by Martha Colburn.

At first I was skeptical because you have to adopt different roles simultaneously. You have to learn to self-edit and fortunately I was able to be very critical. An example would be a song called 'Lie Lie Lie', which is a funny a song but I had some very serious lyrics to it. Man, I went in there five fucking times trying to make that song great, but it just wasn't working. Then I realized the lyrics were way too serious for such a silly song. So I ripped them up, threw them on the floor and went in and did it all on the fly, just having fun and creating it all again from scratch. In the end the song became this really crazy, humorous drama. And you have to do that. You have to be critical and keep changing things until it sounds right.

— Serj Tankian

The music video is available on the iTunes order of Elect the Dead.

== Track listing ==
No.	Title	Length
1.	"Lie Lie Lie"	3:34

== Personnel ==
- Serj Tankian – lead vocals, guitar, bass, piano
- Dan Monti – additional bass
- Brain – drums
- Ani Maldjian – additional vocals
