= Empty Walls =

Single by Serj Tankian

from the album Elect the Dead
- Released: September 10, 2007 (Internet); October 15, 2007 (CD)
- Genre: Alternative metal
- Length: 3:49
- Label: Serjical Strike/Reprise
- Songwriter: Serj Tankian
- Producer: Serj Tankian

Serj Tankian singles chronology
"Empty Walls" (2007)	"Lie Lie Lie" (2007)

"Empty Walls" is a song by Armenian-American musician Serj Tankian. It is Tankian's debut solo single and the opening track off of his first solo album, Elect the Dead. The song has been described as a "traditionally pummeling rocker".

"Empty Walls" was released on September 10, 2007, as a digital download and September 25 as a CD single. It can also be found on a 2-track Reprise promo issue dated September 4, 2007 as well as in edited form on promotional copies that have been sent out to radio stations.

An acoustic version of the song also appears on the limited edition of Elect the Dead. The "Victorious Club Mix", as featured on the single, was produced by DJ LethalRush.

The music video for the single was released on Serj Tankian's official YouTube channel on October 26, 2009. The video, which shows activity in a children's playroom that echoes the events of the September 11 terrorist attacks and the subsequent war in Iraq, contains an amended version of the last chorus where it repeats "empty walls" instead of "fucking walls" and "goddamn walls".

== Music video ==
Serj released the music video on September 11, 2007, matching the video's war on terrorism theme. The music video was directed by Tony Petrossian and was uploaded to YouTube on September 12, 2007. The video shows young children playing in a day care center with their play imitating the war on terrorism.

The video opens with a felt Homeland Security Advisory System scale (accompanied by a seal reading "U.S. Department of Playground Sekcureity"), followed by a young girl building two towers of blocks. A boy launches a toy airplane into the towers, knocking them down and upsetting the girl, and she is shown to want revenge.

Various scenes in the video refer to the War in Iraq: the children preparing for play war, a teddy bear being pulled down (referring to the symbolic pulling down of Saddam Hussein's statue), a presidential figure with a sign declaring "Mission Accomplished", a child in a cage reminiscent of one of the Kenneth Bigley hostage videos, the aforementioned collapse of the block towers, a child dressed and positioned in imitation of a published picture of Satar Jabar from the Abu Ghraib prison, and several children pulling another from a toy house to play execute him with a can of silly string (in reference to the Hamdania incident). A boy inside a toy car puts on goggles and is driven into a plastic ball pit wall to cause a burst of confetti, symbolic of the many suicide bombings at US Army checkpoints. The children performing acts similar to those of the US military are clearly distinguished by wearing helmets reminiscent of soldiers' helmets.

Meanwhile Serj, dressed in a top hat and suit, sings as they play. The video concludes as the children all look out the day care window and solemnly watch a Marine Corps detail load a flag-draped casket into a hearse. Meanwhile, the dead Marine's grief-stricken parents are looking in horror and disbelief at the day care, after seeing what the children have done.

The video has also appeared on Much Music's Video on Trial.

== Track listing ==
All tracks are written by Serj Tankian.

CD single
No.	Title	Length
1.	"Empty Walls"	3:51
2.	"Gratefully Disappeared"	1:41

Two-track promo
No.	Title	Length
1.	"Empty Walls"	3:49
2.	"The Unthinking Majority"	3:47

Radio edit promo single
No.	Title	Length
1.	"Empty Walls" (radio edit)	3:52

7" single
No.	Title	Length
1.	"Empty Walls"	3:51
2.	"Empty Walls (Victorious Club Mix)"	5:45

All tracks are written by Serj Tankian.

UK digital download
No.	Title	Length
1.	"Empty Walls"	3:49
2.	"Gratefully Disappeared"	1:41
3.	"Empty Walls (Victorious Club Mix)"	5:45

== Charts ==
=== Weekly charts ===
Weekly chart performance for "Empty Walls"
Chart (2008)	Peak position
Canada Hot 100 (Billboard)	72
Scottish Singles Sales (Official Charts)	36
UK Singles (Official Charts)	78
UK Rock & Metal (Official Charts)	1
US Billboard Hot 100	97
US Alternative Airplay (Billboard)	3
US Mainstream Rock (Billboard)	4

=== Year-end charts ===
Year-end chart performance for "Empty Walls"
Chart (2008)	Position
US Alternative Airplay (Billboard)	24
US Mainstream Rock (Billboard)	33
