= America's Most Talented Kid =

- Also known as: America's Most Talented Kids
- Presented by: Mario Lopez; Dave Coulier; Lance Bass
- Country of origin: United States
- No. of seasons: 3

Production
- Executive producers: Mark Cronin; Peter Johansen; Stuart Krasnow
- Running time: 44 minutes
- Production companies: NBC Studios (season 1); Mindless Entertainment (seasons 2–3)

Original release
- Network: NBC (season 1); PAX TV (seasons 2–3)
- Release: March 28, 2003 – May 22, 2005

America's Most Talented Kid is an American television series that premiered on NBC on March 28, 2003. In each round, three age groups (3–7, 8–12, 13–16) of talented children would perform songs, dance numbers, magic, and other forms of entertainment in front of head judge Lance Bass and other guest celebrity judges, such as Sisqo, Maureen McCormick, Jermaine Jackson and Daisy Fuentes. Host Mario Lopez led the highest scorer from each round until only three children were left to compete in the grand finale. In the end, Cheyenne Kimball was crowned the grand champion.

The final NBC episode featured senior citizens competing in the special America's Most Talented Senior.

A limited-run series on NBC to compete with the growing talent-show trend in reality television, it would later move to PAX TV (which then had a business/content-sharing relationship with Paxson Communications), the title pluralized to "Kids", with Dave Coulier as host and Daryl Sabara, Scarlett Pomers and Bobb'e J. Thompson as judges. Unlike the NBC version, however, each show would crown a $1,000 winner and give the winner a finale slot. The Grand Champion of this season was then 13-year-old rock violinist/singer/songwriter Antonio Pontarelli.

In 2004 American Idol runner-up Diana DeGarmo, 2007 American Idol winner Jordin Sparks, plus American Idol season 9 contestant Aaron Kelly appeared on the show. Singer Tori Kelly performed on the show during the PAX TV run and won, beating out singer and accordionist, Hunter Hayes.

== Notable contestants ==
- Cheyenne Kimball – Grand Champion (2003); debut album The Day Has Come debuted at number 15 on the Billboard 200 in the United States
- JoJo – singer
- Antonio Pontarelli – Grand Champion (2004)
- Tori Kelly – Singer, songwriter, and actress.
- Diana DeGarmo – Later appeared on the third season of American Idol where she finished in second place.
- Julie Dubela – She also appeared in American Juniors and Endurance Tehachapi
- Hunter Hayes – Singer and accordionist
- Jordin Sparks – Vocalist and actress. She was in the Tournament of Champions. Winner of season 6 of American Idol.
