= Lie Lie Lie (Joshua Bassett song) =

2021 single by Joshua Bassett

Single by Joshua Bassett

from the EP Joshua Bassett
- Released: January 14, 2021
- Recorded: 2020
- Genre: Pop rock
- Length: 2:56
- Label: Warner
- Songwriter(s): Joshua Bassett
- Producer(s): Afterhrs

Joshua Bassett singles chronology
"Anyone Else" (2020)	"Lie Lie Lie" (2021)	"Only a Matter of Time" (2021)

Music video
- "Lie Lie Lie" on YouTube

"Lie Lie Lie" is a song by American singer Joshua Bassett. It was released on January 14, 2021, by Warner Records, as the lead single from his eponymous debut EP. Bassett wrote the song, with production from Afterhrs. The official music video for "Lie Lie Lie" was released to YouTube on January 15.

== Background and release ==
Bassett starred in the 2019 Disney+ mockumentary series, High School Musical: The Musical: The Series. He shared a clip of a song called "I Know" on Instagram the day preceding its premiere. He co-wrote a song called "Just for a Moment" for the soundtrack. The series was renewed for a second season in 2021. Bassett signed to Warner Records, and released the singles "Common Sense" and "Anyone Else" in 2020. He was the sole writer on the former.

On January 4, 2021, Bassett announced that "I Know" (now titled "Lie Lie Lie") would be released 10 days later. It was released to digital music and streaming platforms on January 14, followed by its music video the next day. It serves as the lead single from Bassett's eponymous debut EP (2021).

== Composition ==
I wrote 'Lie, Lie, Lie' after I found out someone close to me had been lying about me behind my back for a long time. It always sucks to hear that someone you thought you could trust would throw you under the bus when it benefits them. It happens to all of us, and I think all you can do is seek out people that build you up rather than tear you down.

— Bassett on the origins of "Lie Lie Lie", Billboard

Bassett dismisses a two-faced friend on the lyrics of "Lie Lie Lie", which include: "So you can lie, lie, lie, lie, lie / Go ahead and try, try, try, try, try / It won't work this time, time, time, time, time / I kiss your ass goodbye, bye, bye, bye, bye".

== Music video ==
The music video for "Lie Lie Lie" was released on January 15, 2021. Seventeen's Tamara Fuentes pointed out several similarities between the video and Bassett's High School Musical: The Musical: The Series co-star Olivia Rodrigo's music video for "Drivers License" (2021).

== Credits and personnel ==
Credits adapted from Tidal.

- Joshua Bassett – lead vocals, songwriting, guitar
- Afterhrs – production
- Andrew Haas – background vocals, bass, guitar, keyboards, programming, record engineering
- Ian Franzino – background vocals, keyboards, programming, record engineering
- Dale Becker – masterer
- Mark Stent – mixer

== Charts ==
Chart (2021)	Peak position
Ireland (IRMA)	44
New Zealand Hot Singles (RMNZ)	11
UK Singles (OCC)	98
US Bubbling Under Hot 100 (Billboard)	25

== Release history ==
Release dates and formats for "Lie Lie Lie"
Region	Date	Version	Format	Label	Ref.
Various	January 14, 2021	Original	Digital download; streaming	Warner	
Various	February 12, 2021	R3hab remix	Digital download; streaming	Warner	
Various	February 26, 2021	Acoustic piano version	Digital download; streaming	Warner	
