= The Day Has Come =

2006 studio album by Cheyenne Kimball

Studio album by Cheyenne Kimball
- Released: July 11, 2006 (U.S); August 8, 2006 (Canada); March 31, 2007 (Australia)
- Recorded: 2005–2006
- Genre: Pop rock
- Length: 42:34
- Label: Daylight
- Producer: Greg Wells; Brad Smith; Raine Maida

Singles from The Day Has Come
- 1. "Hanging On" Released: 2006; 2. "One Original Thing" Released: 2006; 3. "Four Walls" Released: 2006; 4. "Mr. Beautiful (Canada only)" Released: February 8, 2007

Professional ratings
Review scores
| Source | Rating |
|---|---|
| Allmusic | 4/5 stars |

The Day Has Come is the only studio album by American singer Cheyenne Kimball. The lead single from the album, "Hanging On", peaked at number 53 on the Billboard Hot 100. The album was released on July 11, 2006. Kimball co-wrote all the songs featured on the album. The album debuted at #15 on the Billboard 200 selling 40,000 copies in the first week. Miley Cyrus covered the song "Four Walls" on her second studio album Breakout (2008).

== Track listing ==
1. "Intro" (Eddie Head, Cheyenne Kimball) – 0:51
2. "I Want To" (Kara DioGuardi, Kimball, Greg Wells) – 3:36
3. "Hanging On" (Kimball, Chantal Kreviazuk, Raine Maida) – 4:09
4. "One Original Thing" (Kimball, Billy Mann) – 3:32
5. "The Day Has Come" (Scott Cutler, Kimball, Anne Preven) – 3:21
6. "Four Walls" (Cutler, Kimball, Preven) – 3:28
7. "Hello Goodbye" (DioGuardi, Kimball, Wells) – 2:40
8. "Good Go Bad" (Kimball, Brad Smith, Christopher Thorne) – 3:38
9. "Everything to Lose" (Kimball, Smith, Thorn) – 3:41
10. "Breaking Your Heart" (Kimball, Vicky McGehee, John Rich) – 4:00
11. "Mr. Beautiful" (Kimball, Kreviazuk, Maida) – 2:58
12. "Didn't I" (Kevin Griffin, Kimball) – 3:46
13. "Full Circle" (Kimball, Mann) – 2:53
14. "Drift Away" (Griffin, Kimball) - 4:08 [International digital and US iTunes Store Bonus Track]
15. "Mr. Beautiful (Acoustic Version)" (Griffin, Kimball) - 4:08 [International digital and US iTunes Store Bonus Track]
16. "Behind the Scenes: Video" [US iTunes Store Bonus Video]

== Chart performance ==
=== Singles ===
| Year | Single | US | US Pop | Record Report |
|---|---|---|---|---|
| 2006 | "Hanging On" | 53 | 48 | 5 |
