= Cheyenne Kimball =

American singer-songwriter (born 1990)

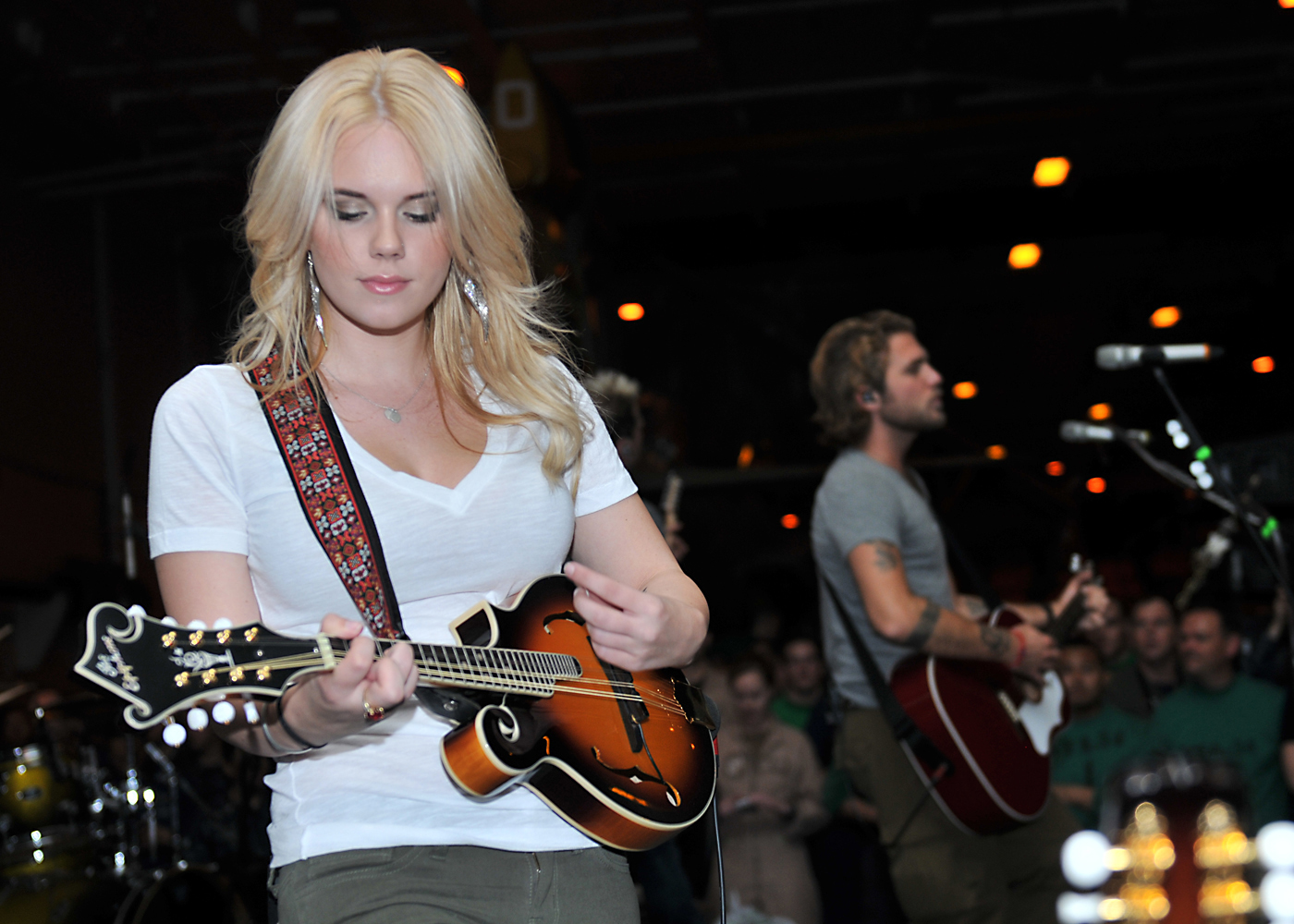
- Kimball performing aboard the USS Abraham Lincoln (CVN-72) in 2010

Background information
- Born: Cheyenne Nichole Kimball; July 27, 1990 (age 36)
- Genres: Pop rock, acoustic, country
- Occupation: Singer-songwriter
- Instruments: Guitar, vocals, mandolin, piano
- Years active: 2003–present
- Labels: Epic/Daylight (solo); Emblem/New Revolution/Warner Bros. (in Gloriana)
- Formerly of: Gloriana

Cheyenne Nichole Kimball (born July 27, 1990) is an American singer-songwriter, guitarist, and mandolinist. Her debut album, The Day Has Come, was released in July 2006, coinciding with an MTV reality series following her entry into the music industry. This album produced a charting single on the Billboard Hot 100 in "Hanging On." From 2008 to 2011, she was a member of the country music band Gloriana, which made its chart debut in 2009.

== Career ==
Kimball was signed to Epic Records. She appeared on and won the TV show America's Most Talented Kid at the age of twelve. She released her Epic Records debut album, The Day Has Come, on July 11, 2006, with her first single and video, "Hanging On", sent to Top 40 mainstream radio and video outlets (VH1 and MTV) in early April 2006. She began her first cross-country tour on April 17 to promote her single and album.

To further promote her music, she had an MTV television show called Cheyenne, which premiered May 31, 2006, at 10:30 pm EST in the United States. The show later premiered on June 21, 2006, in Canada. She also appeared on the Aquamarine movie soundtrack with the song One Original Thing, the song was released as a single in October 2006. She has released the iTunes exclusive single "Drift Away". On December 5, 2006, Kimball's reality show DVD was released. Her song "Four Walls" was released as a single in January. Kimball performed in the 2006 Macy's Thanksgiving Day Parade singing "Four Walls" and live at the Pro Bowl on February 10, 2007.

In 2008, Kimball put her solo career on hold. She joined the country music band Gloriana, in which she sang and played mandolin. The band made its chart debut in 2009 with the single "Wild at Heart", a Top 20 country hit and released their self-titled debut album in August 2009. The band served as one of the opening acts for Taylor Swift's Fearless Tour in 2009 along with Kellie Pickler. Gloriana also appeared in the 2010 Macy's Thanksgiving Day Parade on November 25, 2010. After continued success including two more Top 40 country singles, Gloriana began work on their second studio album in 2011. The band released the first single from the album called "Wanna Take You Home". This would be the last Gloriana single to feature Kimball's vocals.

On July 11, 2011, it was announced on Gloriana's official website that Kimball had left the band. She announced her departure on Gloriana's official Twitter page on July 9, 2011. However, her tweet was later deleted.

== Personal life ==
In September 2010, Kimball announced her engagement to singer Casey Twist. The following month she revealed that they had ended their relationship. In July 2011, Kimball announced that she was engaged to musician Benji White, but they split shortly after. In 2017, Kimball welcomed her first child, a daughter.

== Discography ==
=== Studio albums ===
Title	Details	Peak chart positions		Certifications (sales threshold)
Title	Details	US	CAN	Certifications (sales threshold)
The Day Has Come	Release date: July 11, 2006; Label: Daylight Records; Formats: CD, music download	15	28	CAN: Gold

=== Singles ===
Year	Single	Chart positions			Album
Year	Single	US	US Pop	VEN Pop Rock	Album
2006	"Hanging On"	53	29	8	The Day Has Come
2006	"One Original Thing"	—	—	—	The Day Has Come
2007	"Four Walls"	—	—	—	The Day Has Come

=== Music videos ===
Year	Video
2006	"Hanging On"

== MTV show ==
=== Episode list ===
1. "Meet Cheyenne" (First broadcast on May 31, 2006)
2. "Manifest Destiny" (First broadcast on June 7, 2006)
3. "You'll Never Guess Where I'm Texting You From" (First broadcast on June 14, 2006)
4. "Wish You Were Here" (First broadcast on June 21, 2006)
5. "Almost Vacation" (First broadcast on June 28, 2006)
6. "Almost Famous" (First broadcast on July 5, 2006)
7. "Dress Away" (First broadcast on July 12, 2006)
8. "The End Is the Beginning" (First broadcast on July 19, 2006)
- Cheyenne's reality show DVD was released on December 5, 2006
