= Wild at Heart (Gloriana song) =

Single by Gloriana

from the album Gloriana
- Released: February 2, 2009
- Recorded: 2008
- Studio: Blackbird Studios (Nashville, Tennessee); Emblem Studios (Calabasas, California)
- Genre: Country
- Length: 3:43 (album version); 3:37 (radio edit)
- Label: Emblem; New Revolution; Warner Bros. Nashville
- Songwriters: Stephanie Bentley; Josh Kear; Matt Serletic
- Producer: Matt Serletic

Gloriana singles chronology
"Wild at Heart" (2009)	"How Far Do You Wanna Go?" (2009)

Music video
- "Wild at Heart" at CMT.com

"Wild at Heart" is a song written by Stephanie Bentley, Josh Kear and Matt Serletic, and recorded by American country music group Gloriana. In February 2009, the song was released as the group's debut single, and was available as a digital download on May 8, 2009. It served as the lead-off single to Gloriana's self-titled debut album that was released August 4, 2009.

== Critical reception ==
Roughstock critic Matt Bjorke spoke positively of the song. He compared Gloriana to Little Big Town, another country group with four part harmonies and said, "It’s easy to like songs like this, even if the lyrics don’t really say too much in the way of insightful messages, we all need and like to hear feel-good songs every once in a while."

The song became the best-selling country music debut single in 2009. It was certified gold by the Recording Industry Association of America on August 18, 2010, for digital sales of 500,000 copies.

== Music video ==
A music video directed by Elliott Lester was released for the song on February 19, 2009. In the video, the group is shown driving around town at night with neon signs in the background as well as performing with their instruments inside a house. After the song's second chorus, people enter the house and begin clapping and dancing to the music while Gloriana finishes the song.

"Wild at Heart" debuted at No. 19 on CMT's "Top 20 Countdown" for the week of May 1, 2009; it has since reached #10. The video was nominated for USA Weekend Breakthrough Video of the Year and Group Video of the Year at the 2009 CMT Music Awards.

== Charts and certifications ==
"Wild at Heart" debuted at No. 54 on the U.S. Billboard Hot Country Songs chart in February 2009. It reached No. 16 on the chart dated for July 25, 2009 and fell from the chart the next week, but re-entered at No. 16 on the week of August 1, and reached a new peak of No. 15 the next week, before falling off yet again this time for good.

=== Chart performance ===
Chart (2009)	Peak position
US Billboard Hot 100	53
US Hot Country Songs (Billboard)	15

=== Year-end charts ===
Chart (2009)	Position
US Country Songs (Billboard)	51

=== Certifications ===
Region	Provider	Certification
United States	RIAA	Gold
