= System of a Down discography =

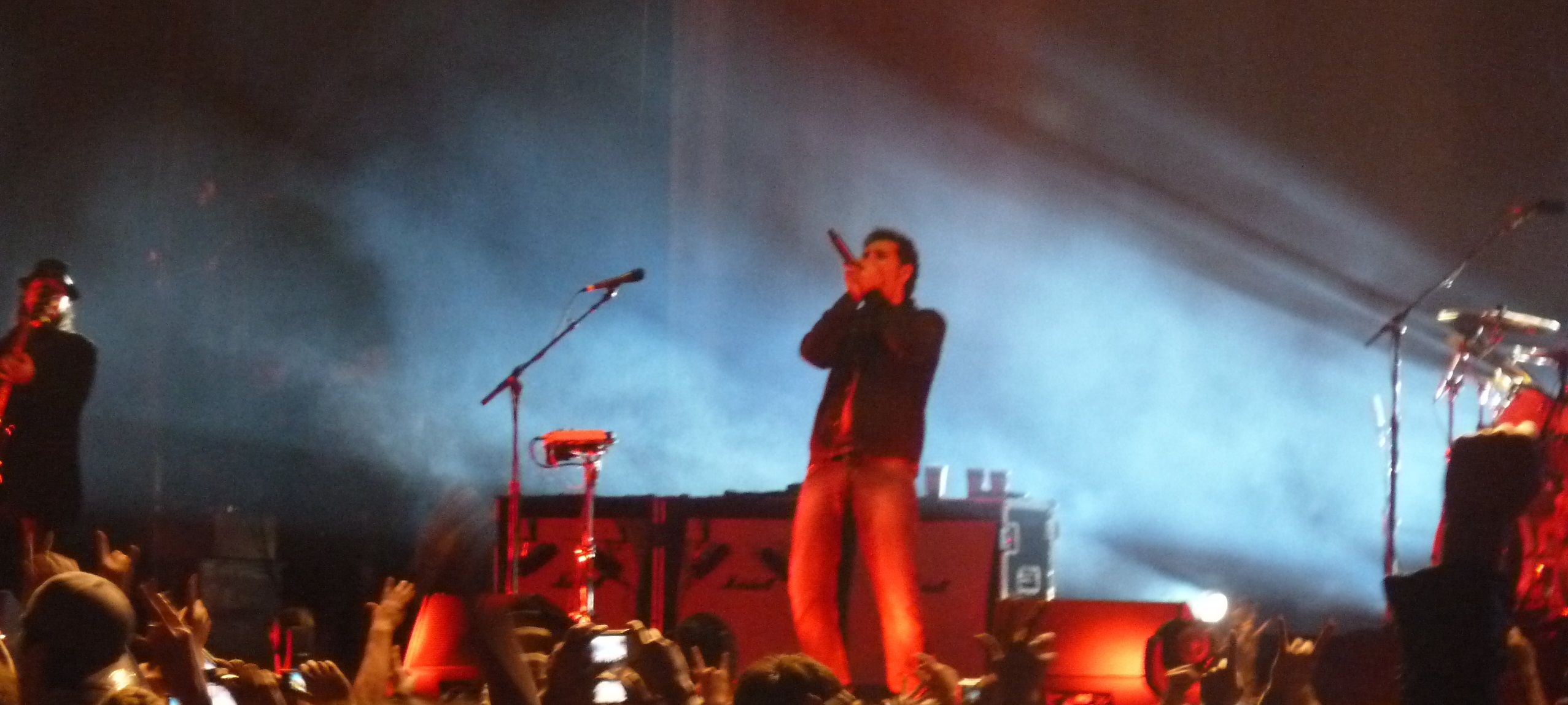
- System of a Down in 2011
- Studio albums: 5
- Singles: 19
- Music videos: 13
- Other appearances: 5

System of a Down is an Armenian-American heavy metal band formed by vocalist Serj Tankian, guitarist Daron Malakian, bassist Shavo Odadjian, and drummer John Dolmayan in the mid-1990s. They have released five studio albums, nineteen singles (including promotional releases), and thirteen music videos. By the end of 1997, the group had signed to American Recordings, then distributed as Columbia Records. The following year, they released their eponymous debut album, which peaked at number 124 on the United States' Billboard 200 and number 103 on the United Kingdom's UK Albums Chart; it was later certified double platinum by the Recording Industry Association of America (RIAA) and gold by Music Canada (MC). Their eponymous debut album produced a single for the song "Sugar", which reached the top 30 on the Billboard mainstream rock songs and alternative songs charts. Their follow-up album, Toxicity (2001), topped the US and Canadian charts, and also reached the top 10 in Australia, Finland, and New Zealand. The album was certified seven-times platinum in its home country, and triple platinum in Australia by the Australian Recording Industry Association (ARIA), as well as double platinum by Music Canada. Toxicity produced singles for the title track, "Chop Suey!", and "Aerials". The last of these peaked at number one on the Billboard Mainstream Rock Songs and Alternative Songs charts.

Steal This Album! (2002) failed to repeat the same success as its predecessor, reaching the top 20 in only the US and Australia. Three years later, the group produced a double album, with the two sections released six months apart. The first, entitled Mezmerize, was released in early 2005; it peaked at number one in nine countries, and certified triple platinum in Canada, platinum in the US and Australia. This album's first single, "B.Y.O.B.", peaked at No. 27 on the Billboard Hot 100 and No. 26 on the UK Singles Chart. The follow-up, "Question!", reached the top 40 in the United Kingdom and Ireland. Later that year, the group released the second part, Hypnotize. Like its predecessor, the album peaked at number one in the US, Canadian, Finnish, and New Zealand charts. System of a Down is the first band since The Beatles to release two chart-topping albums in the US in the same year. Hypnotize was certified platinum in US, and gold in Australia, Germany, and Switzerland. It produced two singles, the title track and "Lonely Day", which reached No. 4 and No. 16 on the Finnish chart, respectively. In 2006, the group went on a hiatus, and since then, all members had begun work on side projects. A reunion was announced on November 29, 2010. On November 6, 2020, System of a Down released their first songs in 15 years, "Protect the Land" and "Genocidal Humanoidz". Both songs also received a music video and marked the band's first single in 14 years, since "Lonely Day".

== Albums ==
=== Studio albums ===
Title	Album details	Peak chart positions										Sales	Certifications
Title	Album details	US	AUS	CAN	FIN	GER	IRL	NLD	NZ	SWI	UK	Sales	Certifications
System of a Down	Released: June 30, 1998; Label: American; Formats: CD, CS, DI, LP	113	48	—	—	—	—	68	—	—	—	UK: 649,144	RIAA: 2× Platinum; BPI: Platinum; MC: Gold; RMNZ: Gold
Toxicity	Released: September 4, 2001; Label: American; Formats: CD, CS, LP, DI	1	6	1	8	23	17	17	7	31	13	US: 3,000,000; UK: 782,722	RIAA: 7× Platinum; ARIA: 3× Platinum; BPI: 2× Platinum; BVMI: Gold; IFPI SWI: Gold; MC: 2× Platinum; NVPI: Gold; RMNZ: 3× Platinum
Steal This Album!	Released: November 26, 2002; Label: American, Columbia; Formats: CD, LP, DI	15	11	13	25	14	47	41	26	25	56	US: 1,000,000; FIN: 15,886	RIAA: Platinum; ARIA: Gold; BPI: Gold; BVMI: Gold; IFPI FIN: Gold; RMNZ: Gold
Mezmerize	Released: May 17, 2005; Label: American, Columbia; Formats: CD, LP, DI	1	1	1	2	1	2	5	1	1	2	FIN: 33,068	RIAA: 2× Platinum; ARIA: Platinum; BPI: Platinum; BVMI: 3× Gold; IFPI FIN: Platinum; IFPI SWI: Gold; IRMA: Platinum; MC: 3× Platinum; RMNZ: 2× Platinum
Hypnotize	Released: November 22, 2005; Label: American, Columbia; Formats: CD, LP, DI	1	3	1	1	4	10	15	1	4	11	FIN: 31,990	RIAA: Platinum; ARIA: Gold; BPI: Gold; BVMI: Platinum; IFPI FIN: Platinum; IFPI SWI: Gold; IRMA: Platinum; RMNZ: Platinum
"—" denotes a release that did not chart.

=== Demo albums ===
Title	Album details
Untitled Demo Tape	Released: 1995; Label: Not on label; Format: Cassette
Demo Tape 1	Released: 1995; Label: System Management/System Inc.; Format: Cassette
Demo Tape 2	Released: 1996; Label: SYSTEMA; Format: Cassette
Demo Tape 3	Released: 1996 (Re-released 1997); Label: Velvet Hammer; Format: Cassette
Demo Tape 4	Released: 1997; Label: Universal; Format: Cassette

== Singles ==
List of singles as lead artist, with selected chart positions and certifications, showing year released and album name
Song	Year	Peak chart positions										Certifications	Album
Song	Year	US	US Alt.	US Main. Rock	AUS	FIN	GER	IRL	NLD	SWI	UK	Certifications	Album
"Sugar"	1998	—	31	28	—	—	—	—	—	—	136	RIAA: Platinum; BPI: Silver; RMNZ: Gold	System of a Down
"Spiders"	1999	—	38	25	—	—	—	—	—	—	—	RMNZ: Gold	System of a Down
"Chop Suey!"	2001	76	7	12	14	21	—	46	25	—	17	RIAA: Diamond; ARIA: Gold; BPI: 2× Platinum; BVMI: Platinum; RMNZ: 5× Platinum	Toxicity
"Toxicity"	2002	70	3	10	39	—	—	47	75	90	25	RIAA: 6× Platinum; BPI: Platinum; BVMI: Gold; RMNZ: 3× Platinum	Toxicity
"Aerials"	2002	55	1	1	36	—	—	35	—	—	34	RIAA: 4× Platinum; BPI: Gold; RMNZ: 2× Platinum	Toxicity
"B.Y.O.B."	2005	27	4	4	42	—	—	—	—	—	26	RIAA: 3× Platinum; BPI: Gold; BVMI: Gold; RMNZ: 2× Platinum	Mezmerize
"Question!"	2005	— (Note: "Question!" did not enter the Billboard Hot 100, but peaked at number two on the Bubbling Under Hot 100 Singles chart.)	9	7	—	—	—	47	—	—	41	RIAA: Gold	Mezmerize
"Hypnotize"	2005	57	1	5	—	—	4	47	31	—	48	RIAA: Platinum; RMNZ: Gold	Hypnotize
"Lonely Day"	2006	— (Note: "Lonely Day" did not enter the Billboard Hot 100, but peaked at number 23 on the Bubbling Under Hot 100 Singles chart.)	10	10	37	—	16	—	—	72	—	RIAA: Platinum; BPI: Gold; BVMI: Gold; RMNZ: 2× Platinum	Hypnotize
"Protect the Land"	2020	— (Note: "Protect the Land" did not enter the Billboard Hot 100, but peaked at number 20 on the Digital Song Sales chart.)	— (Note: "Protect the Land" did not enter the Alternative Songs chart, but peaked at number three on the Alternative Digital Songs chart.)	24	— (Note: "Protect the Land" did not enter the Australian ARIA Singles Chart but peaked on the ARIA Digital Track Chart at number 22.)	— (Note: "Protect the Land" did not enter the Finnish Singles Chart, but peaked at number 95 on the Finland Radio Chart.)	—	—	—	—	— (Note: "Protect the Land" did not enter the UK Singles Chart, but peaked at number 29 on the UK Singles Sales chart.)		Non-album single
"Genocidal Humanoidz"	2020	— (Note: "Genocidal Humanoidz" did not enter the Billboard Hot 100, but peaked at number 24 on the Digital Song Sales chart.)	— (Note: "Genocidal Humanoidz" did not enter the Alternative Songs chart, but peaked at number five on the Alternative Digital Songs chart.)	—	— (Note: "Genocidal Humanoidz" did not enter the Australian ARIA Singles Chart but peaked on the ARIA Digital Track Chart at number 27.)	—	—	—	—	—	—		Non-album single
"—" denotes a release that did not chart.

=== Promotional singles ===
Song	Year	Peak chart positions					Certifications	Album
Song	Year	US Bub.	US Act. Rock	US Alt.	US Herit. Rock	US Main. Rock	Certifications	Album
"Prison Song" / "X"	2001	—	—	—	—	—	RIAA: Platinum; RMNZ: Gold	Toxicity
"Johnny"	2001	—	—	—	—	—		"Chop Suey!" single
"Innervision"	2002	7	10	12	35	14		Steal This Album!
"Boom!"	2003	—	—	—	—	—		Steal This Album!
"Cigaro"	2005	—	30	29	—	34		Mezmerize
"Violent Pornography"	2005	—	—	—	—	—	RIAA: Gold; RMNZ: Gold	Mezmerize
"Kill Rock 'n Roll"	2006	—	37	—	—	38		Hypnotize
"Vicinity of Obscenity"	2006	—	—	—	—	—		Hypnotize
"—" denotes a release that did not chart.

== Other charting and certified songs ==
Song	Year	Peak chart positions	Certifications	Album
Song	Year	POL	Certifications	Album
"Needles"	2001	—	RIAA: Gold	Toxicity
"Deer Dance"	2001	—	RIAA: Gold	Toxicity
"Forest"	2001	—	RIAA: Gold	Toxicity
"ATWA"	2001	—	RIAA: Gold; RMNZ: Gold	Toxicity
"Psycho"	2001	—	RIAA: Gold	Toxicity
"Lost in Hollywood"	2005	7		Mezmerize
"Radio/Video"	2005	—	RMNZ: Gold	Mezmerize
"—" denotes a release that did not chart.

== Music videos ==
Title	Year	Director(s)
"Sugar"	1998	Nathan "Karma" Cox
"War?"	1998	Nathan "Karma" Cox
"Spiders"	1999	Charlie Deaux
"Chop Suey!"	2001	Marcos Siega
"Toxicity"	2002	Shavo Odadjian and Marcos Siega
"Aerials"	2002	Shavo Odadjian and David Slade
"Boom!"	2003	Michael Moore
"B.Y.O.B."	2005	Jake Nava
"Question!"	2005	Shavo Odadjian and Howard Greenhalgh
"Hypnotize"	2005	Shavo Odadjian
"Lonely Day"	2006	Josh Melnick and Xander Charity
"Protect the Land"	2020	Shavo Odadjian and Ara Soudjian
"Genocidal Humanoidz"	2021	Shavo Odadjian and Adam Mason

== Other works ==
- Limited Edition Tour CD (2000): Limited edition EP given out at live shows. Includes three studio tracks and three live tracks.
- More Toxicity (2001): Limited edition French EP. Contains four live tracks and bonus track "Johnny".
- Toxicity II (2002): Unofficial bootleg/fan leak of songs from the Toxicity sessions. Most songs would later end up remade and re-recorded for Steal This Album!.
- Storaged Melodies (2002): Unofficial bootleg compiling works for OST and collective works.
- Hypnotize Value Added (2005): Best Buy exclusive EP. Only available from Best Buy stores before the album Hypnotize was released. Retailed for $1.99 and contained a coupon for $1.99 off the price of the album when it was released on November 22, 2005.
- System Of A Down (2011): The box set that was released on June 10, 2011 via American Recordings. Contains all five of their studio albums.

== Other appearances ==
- Chef Aid: The South Park Album (1998) – "Will They Die 4 You?" (with Mase, Puff Daddy & Lil' Kim)
- Strangeland (1998) – "Marmalade"
- Book of Shadows: Blair Witch 2 (2000) – "Mind"
- Dracula 2000 (2000) – "The Metro" (Berlin cover)
- Heavy Metal 2000 (2000) – "Störagéd"
- Loud Rocks (2000) – "Shame" (Wu-Tang Clan Cover)
- MTV The Return of the Rock (2000) – "Suite-Pee"
- Nativity in Black, Vol. 2: A Tribute to Black Sabbath (2000) – "Snowblind" (Black Sabbath Cover)
- Scream 3 (2000) – "Spiders"
- Not Another Teen Movie (2001) – "The Metro" (Berlin cover)
- The Scorpion King (2002) – "Streamline"
- Tony Hawk's Pro Skater 4 (2002) – "Shimmy"
- Ozzfest 2002 Live Album (2002) – "Needles"
- ATV Offroad Fury 2 (2002) – "Science"
- Pledge of Allegiance Tour: Live Concert Recording (2002) – "Chop Suey!", "Bounce", and "Toxicity"
- Disturbia (2007) – "Lonely Day"
- Rock Band 2 (2008) – "Chop Suey!"
- Guitar Hero World Tour (2008) – "B.Y.O.B"
- Guitar Hero: Metallica (2008) – "Toxicity"
- Rocksmith 2014 (2014) – "Hypnotize"
- Rock Band 4 (2015) – "Spiders"
- The Secret Life of Pets (2016) – "Bounce"
- Sing 2 (2021) - "Chop Suey"
- Fortnite Festival (2024) - "Toxicity"
