= Protect the Land =

Single by System of a Down
- A-side: "Genocidal Humanoidz"
- Released: November 6, 2020
- Recorded: October 2020
- Studio: Dave's Room (North Hollywood)
- Genre: Alternative metal
- Length: 5:07
- Label: American; Columbia
- Songwriter: Daron Malakian
- Producer: Daron Malakian

System of a Down singles chronology
"Lonely Day" (2006)	"Protect the Land" / "Genocidal Humanoidz" (2020)

Music video
- "Protect the Land" on YouTube

"Protect the Land" is a song recorded by American heavy metal band System of a Down. It was released as a double A-side single with "Genocidal Humanoidz" on November 6, 2020, through American Recordings and Columbia Records, to raise awareness and funds for Armenia and the unrecognised Republic of Artsakh amid the Second Nagorno-Karabakh War. It is the band's first release in 15 years since their fifth studio album Hypnotize (2005), their first single in 14 years since "Lonely Day" (2006), and their first two singles to not feature their long-time producer Rick Rubin. It was instead produced by guitarist and vocalist Daron Malakian, who had produced all of their albums (except for their debut) along with Rubin. The two singles have raised over $600,000 that was donated to the Armenia Fund to help those who have been affected by the war.

== Background and release ==
We as System Of A Down have just released new music for the first time in 15 years. The time to do this is now, as together, the four of us have something extremely important to say as a unified voice. These two songs, "Protect The Land" and "Genocidal Humanoidz" both speak of a dire and serious war being perpetrated upon our cultural homelands of Artsakh and Armenia.

— The band about the inspiration behind the song.

"Protect the Land" was written by the band's guitarist and second singer Daron Malakian in 2018 along with another song about tensions involving the unrecognised Artsakh, called "Lives", for the second Scars on Broadway album, Dictator. In late September 2020, after a new war broke out between Armenia, Artsakh and Azerbaijan in the disputed Nagorno-Karabakh region, the band members started using their platforms to raise awareness of the issue. The band's lead singer Serj Tankian, whose grandfather survived the 1915 Armenian genocide, told The Fader that he sees a "high probability of genocide of Armenians" in Artsakh being carried out by Azerbaijan with the support of Turkey. Tankian donated $250,000 to the Armenia Fund and also participated in an online fundraising concert called "Rock for Artsakh" in October.

Within a few days of deciding to record, each musician started arranging his own part. Tankian developed his harmonies for "Protect the Land" while still in New Zealand, where he lives part-time, and he later flew to Los Angeles on October 11 to join everyone in the studio. They finished tracking the cuts that week. Bassist Shavo Odadjian said that "it was such a pleasure for us to be together in the studio again, very comforting and natural, like no time had passed at all". On November 6, 2020, "Protect the Land" was released along with "Genocidal Humanoidz" digitally as a double A-side single. The artwork of the track features the flag of Armenia with the zig-zag chevron pattern of the flag of the Republic of Artsakh superimposed and the We Are Our Mountains monument in its capital Stepanakert. It is the first release of the band in 15 years since their chart topping fifth studio album Hypnotize from 2005. In an official statement released on their website after the singles' premiere, the band said they hoped their fans would listen to the songs and "be inspired to speak out about the horrific injustices and human rights violations occurring there now".

== Critical reception and composition ==
In a positive review for Louder magazine, Merlin Alderslade wrote that the track is "built around a massive, groovy, swaying Daron Malakian riff that recalls a little of Steal This Album! banger 'Mr Jack'. It sounds huge – a reminder of the guitarist's impeccable knack for a big hook – but really it's the vocals that steal the show here. Daron and lead vocalist Serj Tankian remain metal's greatest singing duo, and hearing their voices wrapped around each other in perfect harmony again doesn't so much pull on the heartstrings as slap them like a double bass". Kory Grow from Rolling Stone wrote: "The track opens with a slow-churning guitar riff and Malakian and Tankian harmonizing lyrics that ask listeners what they would do if someone tried to push them from their homes. 'Would you stay and take a stand?' they ask mournfully. 'Would you stay with gun in hand? They protect the land'. To drive it home, when they repeat those questions later, Malakian runs his hands up his guitar neck, imitating the sound of bombs falling".

== Music video ==
The music video of the song features scenes from the bombardment of Artsakh's capital Stepanakert.

The music video for "Protect the Land" - directed by Shavo Odadjian and Ara Soudjian, and produced by Lara Aslanian - was uploaded to the band's YouTube channel on November 6, 2020. It features footage of Armenian soldiers on the frontlines, as well as shots of the band with projections of some of the footage Odadjian shot superimposed over their faces, similar to the band's “Toxicity” video.

While talking about the concept of the video, Odadjian said: "I brought in everyone from every age. We have babies, my two sons, the high priest of L.A. [Los Angeles], doctors, cab drivers, and soldiers in the video. At the same time, we have people in Armenia in Artsakh filming on the frontlines of the war going on. So the message is, 'I know we're thousands of miles away, but we stand with our troops and we stand for this one common cause as Armenians.'"

The Armenia segment was directed by Armen Soudjian, Arnold Ghazaryan, and co-directed and produced by Arman Nshanian. Soudjian and Nshanian used this as an opportunity to feature Ghazaryan. Ghazaryan, born and raised in Khachmach, a small village of Artsakh, was a soldier in the Artsakh war, and was severely wounded and injured during a battle ten days prior to the music video, as he was serving the Armenian army as a tank commander. He is showcased in the music video wearing his army uniform (in black) and walking in crutches. At 19 years old, this was Ghazaryan’s directorial debut. He has since become a multi-award winning filmmaker for several of his documentaries and short films.

== Personnel ==
Personnel taken from Protect the Land / Genocidal Humanoidz liner notes.

System of a Down

- Daron Malakian – vocals, guitars
- Serj Tankian – vocals
- Shavo Odadjian – bass
- John Dolmayan – drums

Additional musician

- Orbel Babayan – organ

Technical personnel

- Daron Malakian – production
- Rich Costey – mixing
- Paul Fig – engineering
- Vlado Meller – mastering
- Jeremy Lubsey – mastering assistance
- Ara Soudjian – cover photo
- Armen Keleshian – band photography
- Sako Shahinian – album art design

== Charts ==
=== Weekly charts ===
Weekly chart performance for "Protect the Land"
Chart (2020)	Peak position
Australia Digital Tracks (ARIA)	22
Belgium (Ultratip Bubbling Under Flanders)	38
Canada Hot 100 (Billboard)	88
Canada Rock (Billboard)	40
Czech Republic Modern Rock (IFPI)	3
Global 200 (Billboard)	192
Euro Digital Song Sales (Billboard)	18
Hungary (Single Top 40)	11
New Zealand Hot Singles (RMNZ)	20
Scotland (OCC)	38
UK Singles Sales (OCC)	29
UK Singles Downloads (OCC)	26
UK Rock & Metal (OCC)	15
US Digital Song Sales (Billboard)	20
US Hot Rock & Alternative Songs (Billboard)	10
US Hot Hard Rock Songs (Billboard)	1
US Mainstream Rock (Billboard)	24
Wales (OCC)	32

=== Year-end charts ===
Year-end chart performance for "Protect the Land"
Chart (2021)	Position
US Hot Hard Rock Songs (Billboard)	39

== Release history ==
Release dates and formats for "Protect the Land"
Region	Date	Format	Label	Ref.
Various	November 6, 2020	Download; streaming; 7-inch	American; Columbia	

== See also ==
- "Genocidal Humanoidz"
