= Genocidal Humanoidz =

Single by System of a Down
- A-side: "Protect the Land"
- Released: November 6, 2020
- Recorded: October 2020
- Studio: Dave's Room (North Hollywood)
- Genre: Alternative metal
- Length: 2:35
- Label: American; Columbia
- Songwriter: Daron Malakian
- Producer: Daron Malakian

System of a Down singles chronology
"Lonely Day" (2006)	"Protect the Land" / "Genocidal Humanoidz" (2020)

Music video
- "Genocidal Humanoidz" on YouTube

"Genocidal Humanoidz" is a song recorded by American heavy metal band System of a Down. It was released as a double A-side single with "Protect the Land" on November 6, 2020, through American Recordings and Columbia Records, to raise awareness and funds for Armenia and the self-proclaimed Republic of Artsakh amid the Second Nagorno-Karabakh War. It is the band's first release in 15 years since their fifth studio album Hypnotize (2005), their first single in 14 years since "Lonely Day" (2006), and their first two singles to not feature their long-time producer Rick Rubin. It was instead produced by guitarist and vocalist Daron Malakian, who had produced all of their albums (except for their debut) along with Rubin. The two singles have raised over $600,000 that was donated to the Armenia Fund to help those who have been affected by the war.

== Background and release ==
We as System Of A Down have just released new music for the first time in 15 years. The time to do this is now, as together, the four of us have something extremely important to say as a unified voice. These two songs, "Protect The Land" and "Genocidal Humanoidz" both speak of a dire and serious war being perpetrated upon our cultural homelands of Artsakh and Armenia.

— The band about the inspiration behind the song.

"Genocidal Humanoidz" was written by the band's guitarist and second singer Daron Malakian three or four years before its release during a jam session between the band members. Several other songs were written as well during the meeting, but all of them were dropped after the band's lead singer Serj Tankian did not commit to releasing a new album. In late September 2020, after a new war broke out between Armenia, Artsakh and Azerbaijan in the disputed Nagorno-Karabakh region, the band members started using their platforms to raise awareness of the issue. Tankian, whose grandfather survived the 1915 Armenian genocide, told The Fader that he sees a "high probability of genocide of Armenians" in Artsakh being carried out by Azerbaijan with the support of Turkey. Tankian donated $250,000 to the Armenia Fund and also participated in an online fundraising concert called "Rock for Artsakh" in October.

The group got together in 2020 to record "Protect the Land", with bassist Shavo Odadjian saying that "it was such a pleasure for us to be together in the studio again, very comforting and natural, like no time had passed at all". The band's manager said the song captured the importance of the moment, but urged the band members to record another song with a heavier tune to complement it. Thus, all of them agreed on recording "Genocidal Humanoidz". On November 6, 2020, "Genocidal Humanoidz" was released along with "Protect the Land" digitally as a double A-side single. The artwork of the track features the flag of Armenia with the zig-zag chevron pattern of the flag of the Republic of Artsakh superimposed and the We Are Our Mountains monument in its capital Stepanakert. It is the first release of the band in 15 years since their chart topping fifth studio album Hypnotize from 2005. In an official statement released on their website after the singles' premiere, the band said they hoped their fans would listen to the songs and "be inspired to speak out about the horrific injustices and human rights violations occurring there now".

== Critical reception and composition ==
According to Malakian, the song's original lyrics only had to be slightly changed to "make it work with the message we're trying to send out now". He also said that "the song really matched up well [with "Protect the Land"]", adding that the word "humanoids" came to him from the late wrestling manager Bobby "The Brain" Heenan, who used to call the audience "a bunch of humanoids, like a bunch of idiots".

In a positive review for Louder magazine, Merlin Alderslade wrote that the song "is a different beast altogether, clocking in at half of Protect The Land's running time and diving into System's heavier and more scatty, frenetic side. Razor-sharp riffs peel off frantic, hollering yelps from Serj at lightning pace, before the song leaps into a bouncy nu metal stomp and, finally, explodes into a tremolo and blastbeat-fuelled extreme metal meltdown". Additionally, Alderslade declared "he might spout some dodgy opinions these days, but John Dolmayan puts in an absolutely powerhouse performance here, smashing the ever living shit out of the kit while sounding tighter than a Khabib Nurmagomedov chokehold".

== Music video ==
The music video for "Genocidal Humanoidz", directed by Shavo Odadjian and Adam Mason, was uploaded to the band's YouTube channel on January 31, 2021.

== Personnel ==
Personnel taken from Protect the Land / Genocidal Humanoidz liner notes.

System of a Down

- Daron Malakian – vocals, guitars
- Serj Tankian – vocals
- Shavo Odadjian – bass
- John Dolmayan – drums

Technical personnel

- Daron Malakian – production
- Rich Costey – mixing
- Paul Fig – engineering
- Vlado Meller – mastering
- Jeremy Lubsey – mastering assistance
- Ara Soudjian – cover photo
- Armen Keleshian – band photography
- Sako Shahinian – album art design

== Charts ==
Chart performance for "Genocidal Humanoidz"
Chart (2020)	Peak position
Australia Digital Tracks (ARIA)	27
Canada Digital Songs (Billboard)	8
Hungary (Single Top 40)	14
New Zealand Hot Singles (RMNZ)	26
UK Rock & Metal (OCC)	33
US Digital Song Sales (Billboard)	24
US Hot Rock & Alternative Songs (Billboard)	15
US Hot Hard Rock Songs (Billboard)	2

== Release history ==
Release dates and formats for "Genocidal Humanoidz"
Region	Date	Format	Label	Ref.
Various	November 6, 2020	Download; streaming; 7-inch	American; Columbia	

== See also ==
- Protect the Land
