= Sargis Baghdasaryan =

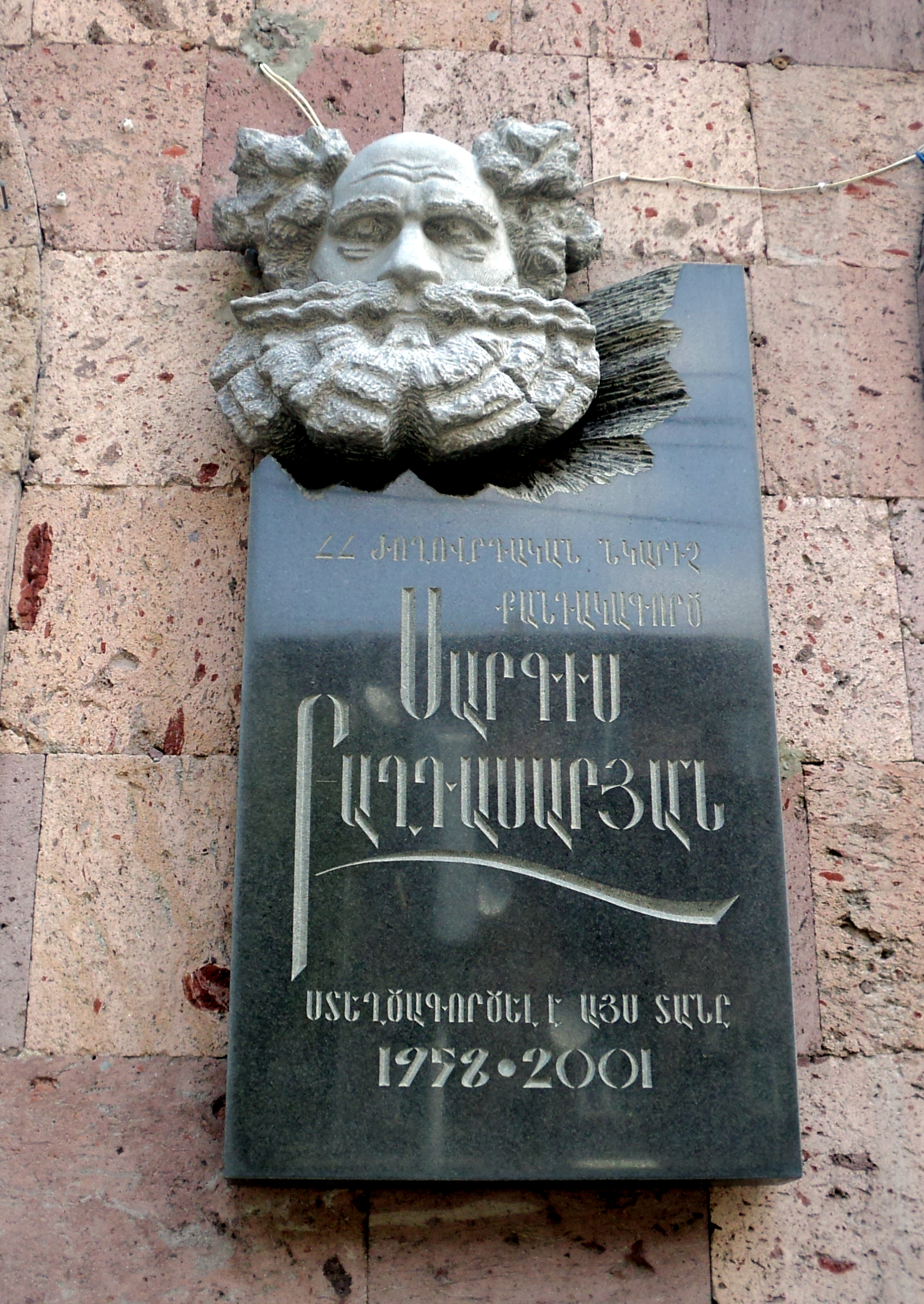
- Baghdasaryan's plaque on Kievyan's street, Yerevan
- Born: September 5, 1923; Banadzor, Soviet Union
- Died: June 19, 2001 (aged 78); Yerevan, Armenia
- Known for: We Are Our Mountains

Sarghis Baghdasaryan, also Baghdasarian (Armenian: Սարգիս Իվանի Բաղդասարյան; September 5, 1923 in Banadzor – June 19, 2001 in Yerevan), was a Soviet Armenian sculptor. He is best known for his 1967 work – We Are Our Mountains, a monument carved into the tuff outside Stepanakert. When the city was controlled by Armenia, it was known as Mamik yev Babik (or "Granny and Grandpa").
