= We Are Our Mountains =

Monument in Stepanakert, Azerbaijan

- The monument in 2017
- Artist: Sargis Baghdasaryan
- Completion date: 1967
- Location: Stepanakert, Azerbaijan; 39°50′13.5″N 46°46′11.42″E

We Are Our Mountains (Armenian: Մենք ենք մեր լեռները, romanized: Menk' enk' mer leṙnerə; Azerbaijani: Biz və bizim dağlar) is a monument north of Stepanakert in the region of Nagorno-Karabakh, Azerbaijan. The sculpture, completed in 1967 by Sargis Baghdasaryan, is widely regarded as a symbol of the Armenian heritage of Nagorno-Karabakh, with some considering it to be a symbol of Armenian identity as a whole.

The monument is made from volcanic tuff and depicts an old man and woman hewn from rock, representing the mountain people of Karabakh. It is known colloquially as "Tatik-Papik" (տատիկ-պապիկ) in Armenian and "Dedo-Babo" (Դեդո-Բաբո) in the Karabakh dialect, which translates as "Grandmother and Grandfather". The sculpture is prominent in Artsakh's coat of arms.

== Recent History ==
=== Eurovision 2009 image controversy ===
During the Eurovision Song Contest 2009, We Are Our Mountains was included, among other local symbols, in the introductory "postcard" preceding the Armenian performance. İctimai Television (İTV) complained to the European Broadcasting Union (EBU) about the use of the monument in the Armenian intro, since the territory of Nagorno-Karabakh at that time was de jure part of Azerbaijan. In response to the complaint, the image was edited out of the video in the finals. In response, the Public Television Company of Armenia (AMPTV) displayed images of the monument on a video screen in the background and on the back of the clipboard held by its spokesperson Sirusho, while presenting the Armenian votes at the finals.

=== After Azeri occupation ===
On 29 September 2023, Azerbaijani officials placed the flag of Azerbaijan on the monument, on the same day of the Azerbaijani takeover of Stepanakert, after the Azerbaijani military offensive in Nagorno-Karabakh undertaken ten days earlier and the subsequent expulsion of the Armenian population. Concerns were raised that Azerbaijan could demolish the monument. Instead, the Azerbaijani government would appropriate the monument, claiming that "it was built in the city of Khankendi in Azerbaijan in 1967 and it is one of the many examples of Azerbaijan's tolerance of multicultural and national-religious monument[s]", while also claiming that the monument was "Armenianised" and that it had always been an Azeri symbol.

In November 2024, photos and videos were posted on Telegram revealing vandalism on both the front and back of the monument. Some of the damage was comments disparaging toward Armenians and Armenia. The area around the site had also been damaged. The Azerbaijani government was considering demolishing the monument. As of June 2026, after AI videos of the monument being destroyed circulated, Azeri officials affirmed it was intact and there were no current plans to demolish it.

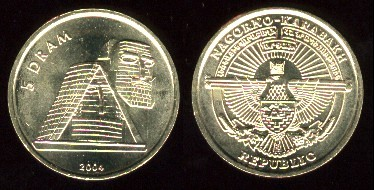
5 Artsakh dram coin with Tatik Papik.

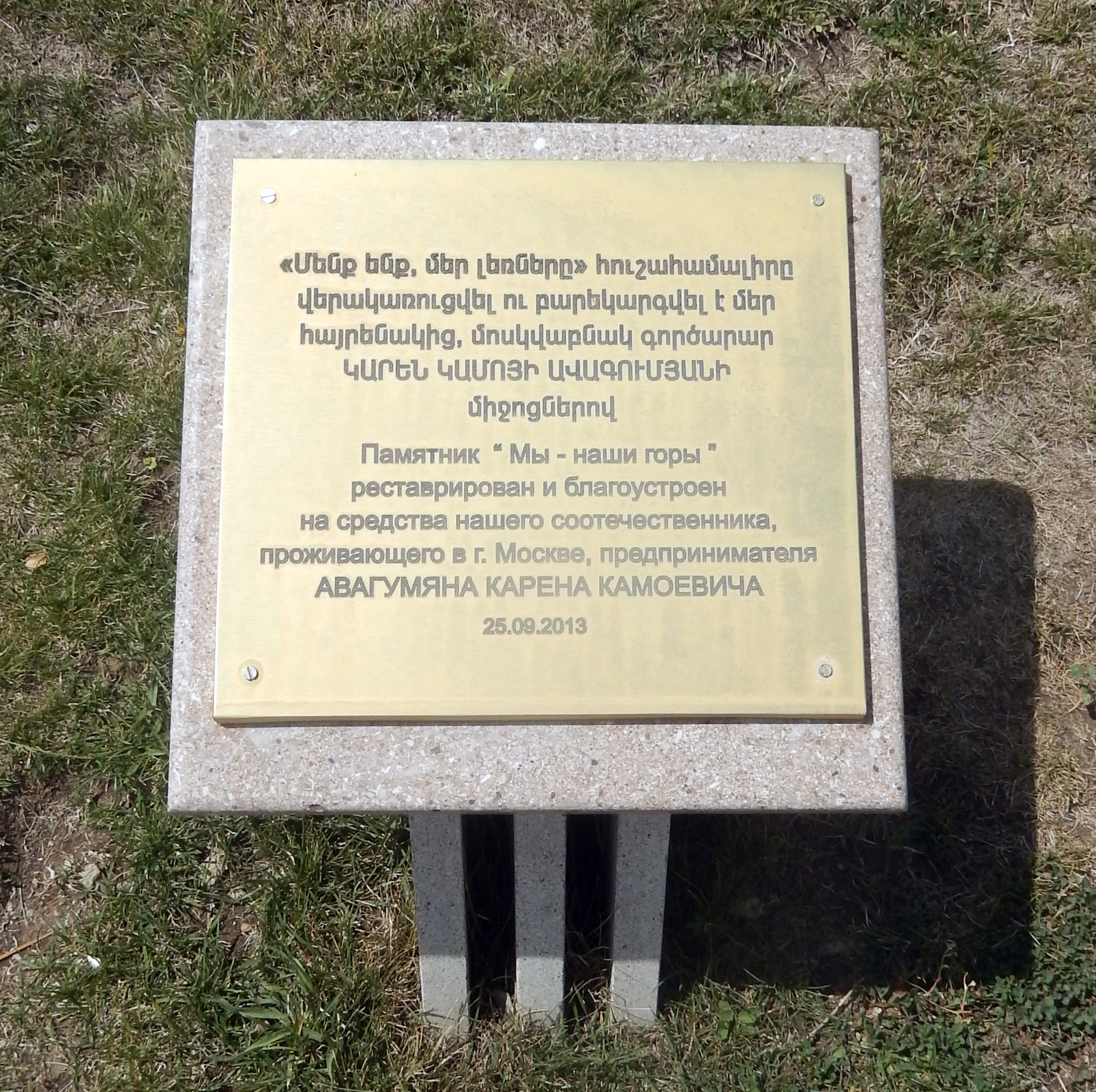
Plaque about the 2013 restoration (which was removed after the 2023 Azerbaijani seizure of Nagorno-Karabakh).

== In popular culture ==
This monument is featured in the artwork of the 2020 songs "Protect the Land" and "Genocidal Humanoidz" by the US band System of a Down to draw attention to the Second Nagorno-Karabakh War.

== Replicas ==
- There is a 9-foot-tall replica of the monument in Newhall, California
- There is a mounted replica in Cleveland, Ohio's Armenian Cultural Garden

== See also ==
- Menq Enq Mer Sarerệ
