= Lonely Day =

- Single cover. Maxi-Single cover features a red theme.

Single by System of a Down

from the album Hypnotize
- B-side: "Snowblind"; "The Metro"; "Marmalade"
- Released: April 17, 2006
- Genre: Alternative metal; hard rock
- Length: 2:47
- Label: American; Columbia
- Songwriter: Daron Malakian
- Producers: Rick Rubin; Daron Malakian

System of a Down singles chronology
| "Hypnotize" (2005) | "Lonely Day" (2006) | "Protect the Land / Genocidal Humanoidz" (2020) |

Music video
- "Lonely Day" on YouTube

"Lonely Day" is a song by American nu metal band System of a Down. It was released on April 17, 2006, as the second single from their fifth studio album, Hypnotize (2005), making it their last single before their hiatus and their most recent single until 2020 with "Protect the Land" and "Genocidal Humanoidz" being released as double A-side singles. Written by guitarist Daron Malakian, who also provides lead vocals, the song also received a nomination for Best Hard Rock Performance at the 49th Annual Grammy Awards.

== Music video ==
The music video opens with a shot of downtown Los Angeles, with the traffic light at the corner of S Broadway & 6th St on fire. The video continues with shots of the band members sitting in their tour bus. There are other various shots of other items that are on fire. In order of appearance, they are as follows: a padlock, a building, shrubs in front of an office building, a newspaper dispenser, a shopping cart, a pay phone, a train car, a stack of wooden pallets, several trees, a billboard, a single car in traffic among other non-burning cars, an advertisement in Chinese at a bus stop, a bench at 7th Street/Metro Center, a dumpster, another building, and the roof of a gas station.

== Track listing ==
Digital download
| No. | Title | Writer(s) | Length |
|---|---|---|---|
| 1. | "Lonely Day" | Daron Malakian | 2:47 |

CD extended play
| No. | Title | Writer(s) | Length |
|---|---|---|---|
| 1. | "Lonely Day" | Daron Malakian | 2:48 |
| 2. | "Shame" (System of a Down featuring Wu-Tang Clan) | Ghostface Killah; GZA; U-God; Inspectah Deck; Ol' Dirty Bastard; RZA; Method Man; Raekwon | 2:41 |
| 3. | "Snowblind" (Black Sabbath cover) | Ozzy Osbourne; Tony Iommi; Geezer Butler; Bill Ward | 4:40 |
| 4. | "Metro" (Berlin cover) | John Crawford | 2:59 |
| 5. | "Marmalade" | Serj Tankian (lyrics); Daron Malakian (music) | 3:01 |
| 6. | "Lonely Day" (Video CD extra) | | 2:57 |

Notes

- "Shame" is a cover of "Shame on a Nigga" by Wu-Tang Clan

== Personnel ==
- Daron Malakian – guitars, lead vocals
- Serj Tankian – keyboards, backing vocals
- Shavo Odadjian – bass
- John Dolmayan – drums

== Charts ==
=== Weekly charts ===
Weekly chart performance for "Lonely Day"
| Chart (2006) | Peak position |
|---|---|
| Australia (ARIA) | 37 |
| Austria (Ö3 Austria Top 40) | 62 |
| Canada Rock Top 30 (Radio & Records) | 17 |
| Czech Republic (Radio Top 100) | 55 |
| Denmark (Tracklisten) | 20 |
| Finland (Suomen virallinen lista) | 16 |
| France (SNEP) | 84 |
| Germany (GfK) | 46 |
| New Zealand (Recorded Music NZ) | 17 |
| Switzerland (Schweizer Hitparade) | 72 |
| US Bubbling Under Hot 100 (Billboard) | 23 |
| US Alternative Airplay (Billboard) | 10 |
| US Mainstream Rock (Billboard) | 10 |

=== Year-end charts ===
Year-end chart performance for "Lonely Day"
| Chart (2006) | Position |
|---|---|
| US Mainstream Rock Songs (Billboard) | 37 |

== Certifications ==
Certifications for "Lonely Day"
| Region | Certification | Certified units/sales |
|---|---|---|
| Denmark (IFPI Danmark) | Gold | 45,000^{‡} |
| Germany (BVMI) | Gold | 300,000^{‡} |
| New Zealand (RMNZ) | 2× Platinum | 60,000^{‡} |
| Spain (Promusicae) | Gold | 30,000^{‡} |
| United Kingdom (BPI) | Gold | 400,000^{‡} |
| United States (RIAA) | Platinum | 1,000,000^{‡} |
^{‡} Sales+streaming figures based on certification alone.
