= Vlado Meller =

Slovak audio engineer (born 1947)

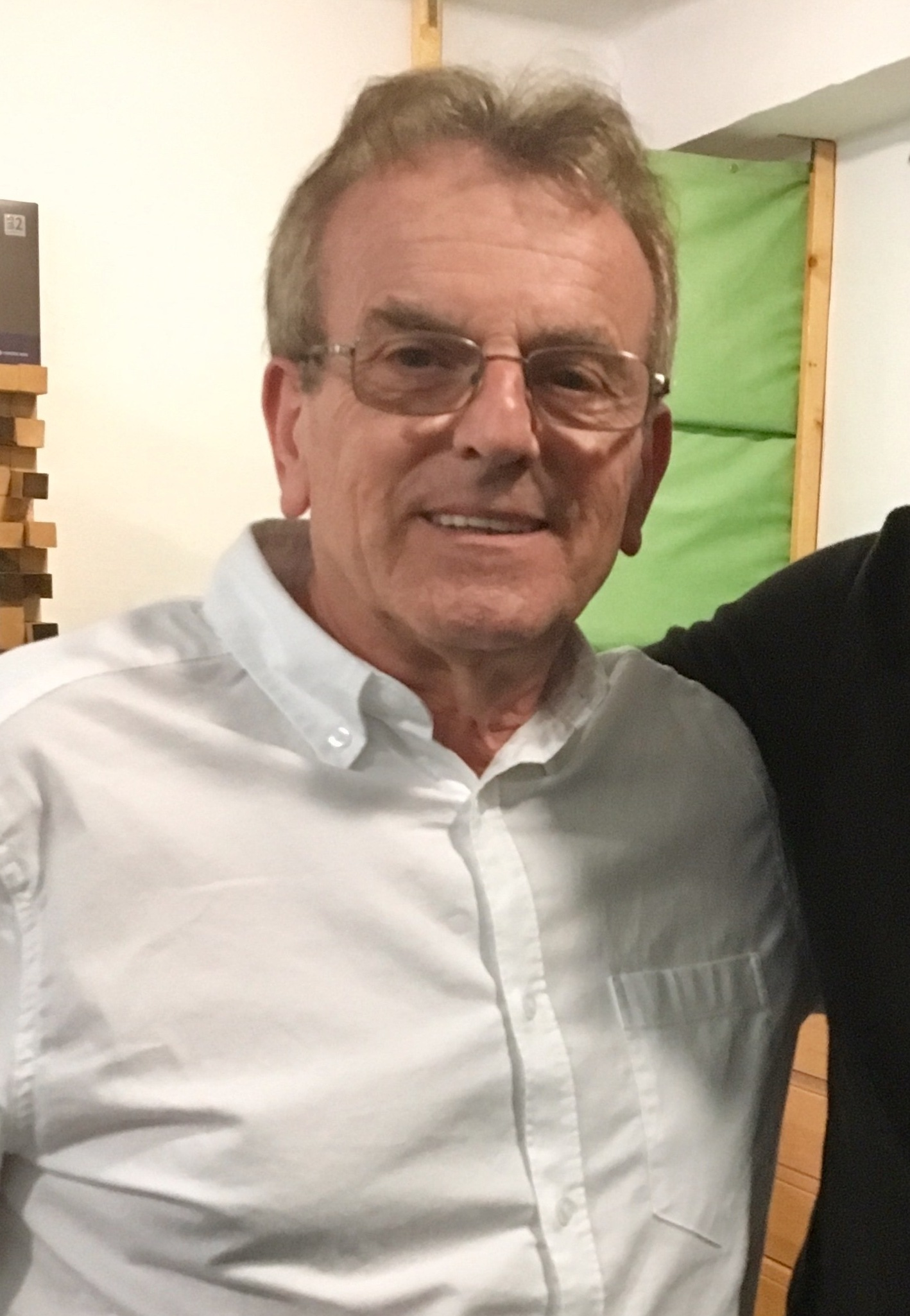
- Meller in 2019
- Born: 1947 (age 78–79); Humenné, Czechoslovakia
- Education: Czech Technical University in Prague
- Occupation: Mastering engineer
- Years active: 1969–present

Vlado Meller (born in 1947 in Humenné as Vladimír Meller) is a Slovak audio mastering engineer, currently with Vlado Meller Mastering in Charleston, South Carolina. Meller works across many genres of music, with credits on rock, hip-hop, pop, jazz, metal, dance, opera, Broadway, and classical albums over 50+ year career. Albums that he engineered have won two Grammy Awards.

== Biography ==
Meller was born in the former Czechoslovakia and received violin lessons at an early age. He graduated from high school in Košice, Slovakia and studied electrical engineering at the Czech Technical University in Prague. After the Soviet Union invaded Czechoslovakia in 1968, Meller was a refugee in Austria and Italy before emigrating to the United States. In December 1969 he obtained an entry-level job at CBS Records in New York, and later received training in audio mastering. He worked with Sony/CBS for 38 years, and then joined Universal Mastering Studios in 2007 as senior mastering engineer. He later spent a short time at Masterdisk, then relocated to Charleston, South Carolina where he opened his own facility, Vlado Meller Mastering, in 2014.

== Discography ==
A list of noteworthy albums Vlado has mastered includes:

- AFI – Crash Love (2009)
- AFI - Bodies (2021)
- Audioslave – Audioslave (2002)
- Beastie Boys – Hot Sauce Committee, Pt. 2 (2011)
- Brockhampton – Ginger (2019)
- Andrea Bocelli – Amore (2006)
- Andrea Bocelli – The Best of Andrea Bocelli: Vivere (2007)
- Johnny Cash – American IV: The Man Comes Around (2002)
- Johnny Cash – My Mother's Hymn Book (2004)
- Johnny Cash – American V: A Hundred Highways (2006)
- Celine Dion – Celine Dion (1992)
- Celine Dion – Let's Talk About Love (1992)
- Celine Dion – Falling into You (1997)
- Maynard Ferguson – Conquistador (1977)
- Julio Iglesias – Love Songs (2004)
- Michael Jackson – Michael (2010)
- Linkin Park – A Thousand Suns (2010)
- Metallica – St. Anger (2003)
- Metallica – Beyond Magnetic (2012)
- Muse - Black Holes and Revelations (2006)
- Oasis – (What's the Story) Morning Glory? (1995)
- Frank Ocean – Channel Orange (2012)
- Ozzy Osbourne - Black Rain (2007)
- Phantogram – Voices (2014)
- Prince – Emancipation (1996)
- Puddle of Mudd - Come Clean (2001)
- Rage Against the Machine – Renegades (2000)
- Red Hot Chili Peppers – Californication (1999)
- Red Hot Chili Peppers – By the Way (2002)
- Red Hot Chili Peppers – Stadium Arcadium (2006)
- Red Hot Chili Peppers – I'm with You (2011)
- Red Hot Chili Peppers – Unlimited Love (2022)
- Red Hot Chili Peppers – Return of the Dream Canteen (2022)
- Paulina Rubio – Planeta Paulina (1996)
- Shakira – Oral Fixation (2005)
- Shakira – She Wolf (2009)
- Slza – Holomráz (2018)
- Swell Daze – Simple Fix (2014)
- System of a Down – Mezmerize (2005)
- System of a Down – Hypnotize (2005)
- Serj Tankian – Elasticity (2021)
- A Tribe Called Quest – We Got It from Here... Thank You 4 Your Service (2016)
- Lil Wayne – Tha Carter III (2008)
- Lil Wayne – Rebirth (2010)
- Weezer – Make Believe (2005)
- Kanye West – Late Registration (2005)
- Kanye West – Graduation (2007)
- Kanye West – 808s & Heartbreak (2008)
- Kanye West – My Beautiful Dark Twisted Fantasy (2011)
- Kanye West – Yeezus (2013)
- Pete Yorn - “Back & Fourth’’ (2009)
- Bad Gyal – Worldwide Angel (2018)
- Samey – Mama neviem kedy prídem domov (2017)
- Samey – XYZ (2019)
- Samey – Anarchia (2021)
- horhi – 4u2c (2024)
- Samey – Slzy ulíc (2023)
- Samey – Kto sa bojí nesmie do lesa (2025)

== Awards and recognition ==
Albums engineered by Meller have been nominated for seven Grammy Awards and have won two Latin Grammy Awards.

=== Grammy Awards ===
Year	Nominee / work	Award	Result
2004	Unearthed	Best Historical Album	Nominated
2005	Late Registration	Album of the Year	Nominated
2006	Stadium Arcadium	Album of the Year	Nominated
2007	Graduation	Album of the Year	Nominated
2008	Tha Carter III	Album of the Year	Nominated
2012	Channel Orange	Album of the Year	Nominated
2012	"Thinkin Bout You"	Record of the Year	Nominated

=== Latin Grammy Awards ===
Year	Nominee / work	Award	Result
2006	Fijación Oral, Vol. 1	Album of the Year	Won
2006	Fijación Oral, Vol. 1	Best Engineered Album	Won
