= Mezmerize =

Studio album by System of a Down
- Released: May 17, 2005
- Studios: The Mansion and Akademie Mathematique of Philosophical Sound Research Studios, Los Angeles, California
- Genres: Nu metal; alternative metal; art rock
- Length: 36:06
- Labels: American; Columbia
- Producers: Daron Malakian; Rick Rubin

System of a Down chronology
Steal This Album! (2002)	Mezmerize (2005)	Hypnotize (2005)

Singles from Mezmerize
- 1. "B.Y.O.B." Released: March 28, 2005; 2. "Question!" Released: July 12, 2005

Mezmerize is the fourth studio album by the Armenian-American heavy metal band System of a Down, released on May 17, 2005, by American Recordings and Columbia Records. Upon its release, the album received acclaim from critics. The album sold over 450,000 copies within the first week, and immediately topped the Billboard 200.

In 2025, Rae Lemeshow-Barooshian of Loudwire included the album in her list of "the top 50 nu-metal albums of all time", ranking it sixteenth.

== Background ==
Mezmerize and Hypnotize are considered two parts of a double album. Mezmerize features guitarist Daron Malakian sharing most of the vocal work with vocalist Serj Tankian, splitting the vocals at least halfway on many of the tracks.

Malakian wrote "Old School Hollywood" after playing in a celebrity baseball game for charity. The song mentions Tony Danza and Frankie Avalon, who also played in the game.

In "Radio/Video", there are lines referring to two people named Danny and Lisa. Malakian commented on the song to Revolver magazine:

"My neighbors were Danny and Lisa, who I sing about in "Radio/Video" with System — they had that record [Paul Stanley's 1978 solo album] and it ended up at my apartment. I would listen to that record all the time. I first saw Kiss at a relative's house. They were older teenagers and had Kiss all over the walls in their bedrooms. I remember being so afraid of Kiss, and it just stuck. Kiss started the metal attitude, metal theatrics and metal fashion — they contributed to that a lot. I was listening to that album in my car with my girlfriend a few months back. When I put it on, I said: 'This album is extremely special to me.'"

In the same interview, Daron Malakian talked about the "non-stop disco" lines in "Violent Pornography":

"I've always been a huge fan of disco music through my life. We have a song called 'Violent Pornography' in System of a Down, and the lyrics are: 'It's a non-stop disco/Betcha didn't know/Betcha didn't know …' That line means, 'I love disco, betcha didn't know.' That has nothing to do with the rest of the song, by the way."

The Japanese version of the album contains alternate mixes of "Soldier Side (Intro)" and "Lost in Hollywood", the former with additional strings and the latter containing slightly different background vocals, while "Cigaro" as a bonus track on the single for "B.Y.O.B." contains a 4-stick hit intro not present in the retail version. The album artwork is done by Vartan Malakian, the father of Daron Malakian.

== Reception ==
Professional ratings
Aggregate scores
Source	Rating
Metacritic	85/100
Review scores
Source	Rating
AllMusic	4.5/5 stars
Blabbermouth.net	4/5 stars
Drowned in Sound	8/10
Entertainment Weekly	A−
People	3/4 stars
Pitchfork	7.1/10
PopMatters	9/10
Rolling Stone	3.5/5 stars
Stylus	B−
Uncut	4/5 stars

Mezmerize was acclaimed by critics, scoring 85 out of 100 on Metacritic based on 19 reviews, indicating "universal acclaim". It has also gained a user score of 8.5 on the platform. The album debuted at number one in at least 12 countries, including the US Billboard 200 on the chart dating June 4, 2005, with 453,000 copies, and has since been certified double platinum by the RIAA. The hit single "B.Y.O.B." won a Grammy Award in 2006 for Best Hard Rock Performance.

== Track listing ==
All music written by Daron Malakian, except "Question!", written by Serj Tankian and Malakian.

Mezmerize tracklist
No.	Title	Lyrics	Lead vocals	Length
1.	"Soldier Side - Intro"	Malakian	Malakian; Tankian	1:04
2.	"B.Y.O.B."	Malakian; Tankian	Tankian; Malakian	4:15
3.	"Revenga"	Malakian; Tankian	Tankian; Malakian	3:48
4.	"Cigaro"	Malakian; Tankian	Tankian; Malakian	2:11
5.	"Radio/Video"	Malakian	Malakian; Tankian	4:09
6.	"This Cocaine Makes Me Feel Like I'm on This Song"	Malakian; Tankian	Tankian	2:08
7.	"Violent Pornography"	Malakian	Tankian; Malakian	3:31
8.	"Question!"	Tankian	Tankian	3:20
9.	"Sad Statue"	Malakian; Tankian	Tankian; Malakian	3:25
10.	"Old School Hollywood"	Malakian	Malakian; Tankian	2:56
11.	"Lost in Hollywood"	Malakian	Malakian	5:20
Total length:				36:06

Notes

- Early releases of the album incorrectly credit Tankian as a co-lyricist on "Lost in Hollywood", this mistake was fixed on later copies.

== Personnel ==
All personnel credits for Mezmerize are adapted from the album's liner notes, except where noted.

System of a Down

- Daron Malakian – vocals, guitars; bass, keyboards (uncredited); production
- Serj Tankian – vocals, keyboards, string arrangements; acoustic guitar on "Question!" (uncredited)
- Shavo Odadjian – bass
- John Dolmayan – drums, percussion

Additional musicians

- Marc Mann – string arrangements

Technical personnel

- Rick Rubin – production
- Andy Wallace – mixing
- David Schiffman – engineering
- Jason Lader – editing
- Dana Nielsen – editing
- Phillip Broussard – engineering assistance
- John O'Mahony – mix Pro Tools engineering
- Steve Sisco – mixing assistance
- Joe Peluso – mixing assistance
- Lindsay Chase – album production coordinator
- Braden Asher – album production coordinator
- Vlado Meller – mastering

Creative personnel

- Vartan Malakian – artwork
- System of a Down – design
- Brandy Flower – design

== Charts ==
=== Weekly charts ===
2005–2006 weekly chart performance for Mezmerize
Chart (2005–2006)	Peak position
Australian Albums (ARIA)	1
Austrian Albums (Ö3 Austria)	1
Belgian Albums (Ultratop Flanders)	6
Belgian Albums (Ultratop Wallonia)	4
Canadian Albums (Billboard)	1
Danish Albums (Hitlisten)	3
Dutch Albums (Album Top 100)	5
European Albums (Billboard)	1
Finnish Albums (Suomen virallinen lista)	2
French Albums (SNEP)	1
German Albums (Offizielle Top 100)	1
Greek Albums (IFPI)	1
Hungarian Albums (MAHASZ)	12
Irish Albums (IRMA)	2
Italian Albums (FIMI)	4
Japanese Albums (Oricon)	6
Mexican Albums (Top 100 Mexico)	5
New Zealand Albums (RMNZ)	1
Norwegian Albums (VG-lista)	2
Polish Albums (ZPAV)	5
Portuguese Albums (AFP)	9
Scottish Albums (Official Charts)	2
Spanish Albums (Promusicae)	12
Swedish Albums (Sverigetopplistan)	1
Swiss Albums (Schweizer Hitparade)	1
UK Albums (Official Charts)	2
US Billboard 200	1
US Top Rock Albums (Billboard)	24

2018 weekly chart performance for Mezmerize
Chart (2018)	Peak position
US Vinyl Albums (Billboard)	16

=== Year-end charts ===
2005 year-end chart performance for Mezmerize
Chart (2005)	Position
Australian Albums (ARIA)	40
Austrian Albums (Ö3 Austria)	24
Belgian Albums (Ultratop Flanders)	65
Belgian Alternative Albums (Ultratop Flanders)	44
Belgian Albums (Ultratop Wallonia)	65
Dutch Albums (Album Top 100)	80
European Albums (Billboard)	31
French Albums (SNEP)	85
German Albums (Offizielle Top 100)	25
Italian Albums (FIMI)	71
Mexican Albums (Top 100 Mexico)	62
New Zealand Albums (RMNZ)	22
Swedish Albums (Sverigetopplistan)	43
Swedish Albums & Compilations (Sverigetopplistan)	51
Swiss Albums (Schweizer Hitparade)	46
UK Albums (OCC)	108
US Billboard 200	32
Worldwide Albums (IFPI)	19

== Certifications ==
Certifications for Mezmerize
Region	Certification	Certified units/sales
Argentina (CAPIF)	Gold	20,000^{^}
Australia (ARIA)	Platinum	70,000^{^}
Austria (IFPI Austria)	Gold	15,000^{*}
Belgium (BRMA)	Gold	25,000^{*}
Brazil (Pro-Música Brasil)	Gold	50,000^{*}
Canada (Music Canada)	3× Platinum	300,000^{^}
Denmark (IFPI Danmark)	Platinum	20,000^{‡}
Finland (Musiikkituottajat)	Platinum	33,068
France (SNEP)	Gold	100,000^{*}
Germany (BVMI)	3× Gold	300,000^{‡}
Greece (IFPI Greece)	Gold	10,000^{^}
Ireland (IRMA)	Platinum	15,000^{^}
Italy (FIMI) sales since 2009	Platinum	50,000^{‡}
New Zealand (RMNZ)	2× Platinum	30,000^{‡}
Switzerland (IFPI Switzerland)	Gold	20,000^{^}
United Kingdom (BPI)	Platinum	300,000^{‡}
United States (RIAA)	2× Platinum	2,000,000^{‡}
^{*} Sales figures based on certification alone.^{^} Shipments figures based on certification alone.^{‡} Sales+streaming figures based on certification alone.
