= Binədərəsi =

Binedarasi / Banadzor Binədərəsi / Բանաձոր
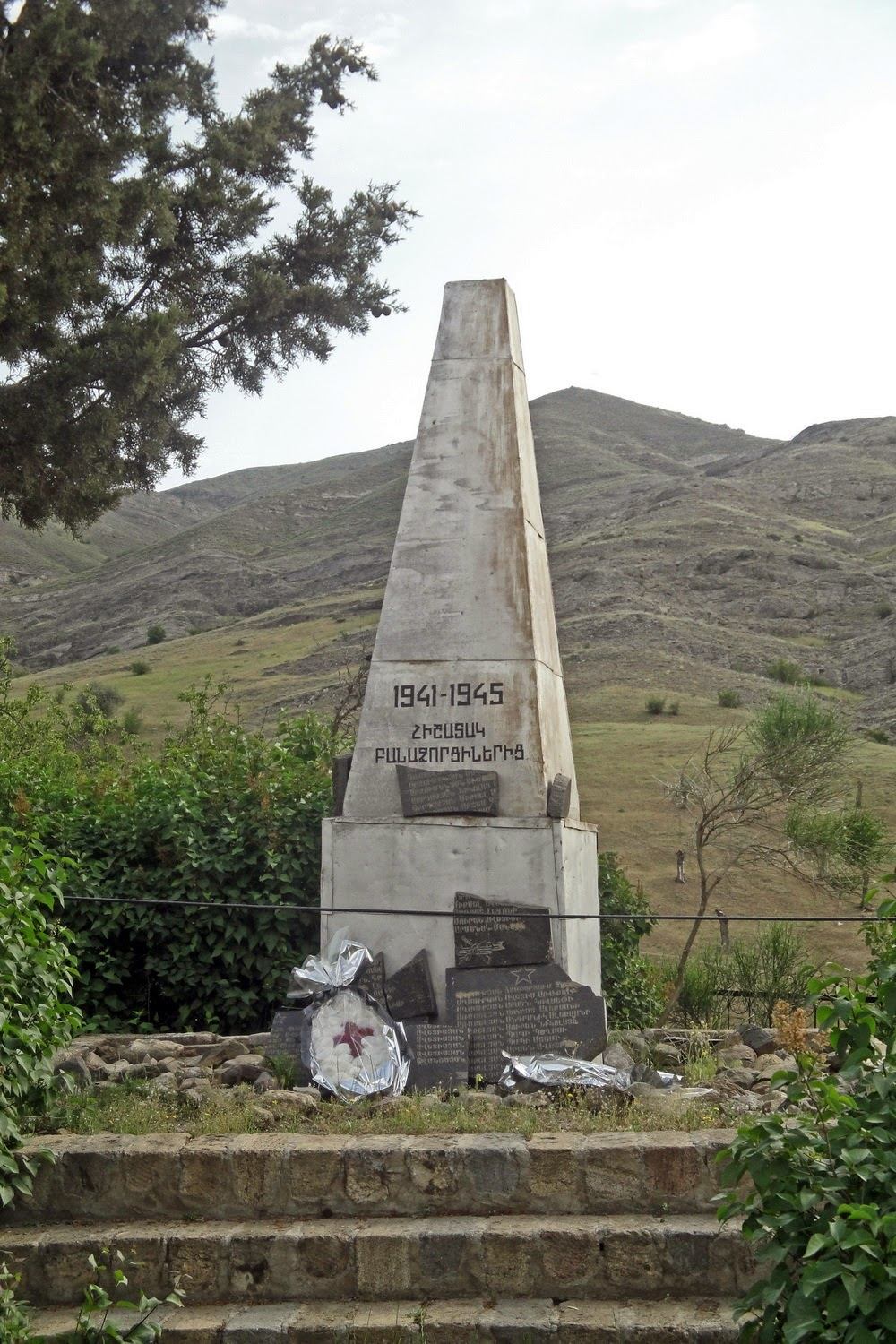
- WWII monument in the village

- Location within Azerbaijan
- Coordinates: 39°27′21″N 47°00′38″E
- Country: Azerbaijan
- District: Khojavend

Population (2015)
  - Total: 175
- Time zone: UTC+4 (AZT)

Binedarasi (Azerbaijani: Binədərəsi) or Banadzor (Armenian: Բանաձոր) is a village in the Khojavend District of Azerbaijan, in the disputed region of Nagorno-Karabakh. The village had an ethnic Armenian-majority population prior to the 2020 Nagorno-Karabakh war, and also had an Armenian majority in 1989. The village had 143 inhabitants in 2005, and 175 inhabitants in 2015.

== History ==
During the Soviet period, the village was part of the Hadrut District of the Nagorno-Karabakh Autonomous Oblast. During the First Nagorno-Karabakh War, the village was destroyed and depopulated along with 16 other settlements in the Hadrut and Shusha districts as part of Operation Ring in 1991. This operation was conducted by the Soviet Army, Internal Troops of the Ministry of Internal Affairs (MVD) of the USSR and OMON units of the Azerbaijan Soviet Socialist Republic. The village came under the control of Armenian forces on 2 October 1992. After the First Nagorno-Karabakh War, the village was administrated as part of the Hadrut Province of the breakaway Republic of Artsakh. The village came under the control of Azerbaijan during the 2020 Nagorno-Karabakh war.

=== Historical heritage sites ===
Historical heritage sites in and around the village include the chapel of Spitak Tgha (Armenian: Սպիտակ տղա) from between the 12th and 14th centuries, the 17th-century church of Surb Astvatsatsin (Armenian: Սուրբ Աստվածածին, lit. 'Holy Mother of God'), a cemetery from between the 17th and 19th centuries, and a 19th-century bridge.
