= Hypnotize (System of a Down song) =

Single by System of a Down

from the album Hypnotize
- Released: October 11, 2005
- Genre: Alternative metal
- Length: 3:09
- Label: American; Columbia
- Composer: Daron Malakian
- Lyricists: Daron Malakian; Serj Tankian
- Producers: Rick Rubin; Daron Malakian

System of a Down singles chronology
"Question!" (2005)	"Hypnotize" (2005)	"Lonely Day" (2006)

Music video
- "Hypnotize" on YouTube

"Hypnotize" is a song by American heavy metal band System of a Down. It was released on October 11, 2005, as the lead single from their fifth studio album of the same name. The music video for the song was filmed on September 28, 2005, at the Van Andel Arena in Grand Rapids, Michigan. It peaked at No. 1 on Billboard's Modern Rock Tracks chart.

== Music video ==
The music video is mostly footage from the band's September 2005 concert at Van Andel Arena in Grand Rapids, Michigan but includes a CGI scene of a painting forming along with the music. It opens and closes with footage of a firefighting helicopter dropping retardant while flying through a city.

== Track listing ==
CD1
No.	Title	Lyrics	Music	Length
1.	"Hypnotize"	D. Malakian; S. Tankian	D. Malakian; S. Tankian	3:09
2.	"Science" (Live from the Hurricane Festival – Explicit)	S. Tankian	D. Malakian	2:37

CD2
No.	Title	Lyrics	Music	Length
1.	"Hypnotize"	D. Malakian; S. Tankian	D. Malakian	3:09
2.	"Mr. Jack" (Live from the Hurricane Festival – Explicit)	S. Tankian; D. Malakian	D. Malakian	7:14
3.	"War?" (Live from the Hurricane Festival – Explicit)	S. Tankian	D. Malakian	3:58

7" single
No.	Title	Lyrics	Music	Length
1.	"Hypnotize"	D. Malakian; S. Tankian	D. Malakian	3:09
2.	"Forest" (Live from the Hurricane Festival – Explicit)	S. Tankian	D. Malakian	4:05

iTunes single
No.	Title	Lyrics	Music	Length
1.	"Hypnotize"	D. Malakian; S. Tankian	D. Malakian	3:09

== Charts ==
=== Weekly charts ===
Weekly chart performance for "Hypnotize"
Chart (2005–2006)	Peak position
Canada Rock Top 30 (Radio & Records)	15
Finland (Suomen virallinen lista)	4
Germany (GfK)	83
Greece (IFPI)	23
Ireland (IRMA)	47
Italy (FIMI)	44
Netherlands (Single Top 100)	31
Scottish Singles Sales (Official Charts)	30
UK Singles (Official Charts)	48
UK Rock & Metal (Official Charts)	5
US Billboard Hot 100	57
US Alternative Airplay (Billboard)	1
US Mainstream Rock Airplay (Billboard)	5

=== Year-end charts ===
Year-end chart performance for "Hypnotize"
Chart (2006)	Position
US Alternative Songs (Billboard)	10
US Mainstream Rock Songs (Billboard)	24

== Certifications ==
Certifications for "Hypnotize"
Region	Certification	Certified units/sales
New Zealand (RMNZ)	Gold	15,000^{‡}
United States (RIAA)	Platinum	1,000,000^{‡}
^{‡} Sales+streaming figures based on certification alone.
