= Question! =

Single by System of a Down

from the album Mezmerize
- Released: July 12, 2005
- Length: 3:20
- Label: American; Columbia
- Composers: Daron Malakian; Serj Tankian
- Lyricist: Serj Tankian
- Producers: Rick Rubin; Daron Malakian

System of a Down singles chronology
"B.Y.O.B." (2005)	"Question!" (2005)	"Hypnotize" (2005)

Maxi single
- Cover of the maxi single of "Question!"

DVD single
- Cover of the DVD single of "Question!"

Music video
- "Question!" on YouTube

"Question!" is a song by American heavy metal band System of a Down, released in July 2005 as the second single from their fourth studio album, Mezmerize (2005).

== Release ==
After the release of "B.Y.O.B.", the band were deciding what song to release as a single. They eventually chose "Question!" after finding out radio stations had already been playing the track.

== Music video ==
Shavo Odadjian produced the video, and co-directed it alongside Howard Greenhalgh, after allegedly having an image of the video in a nightmare, which consisted of a boy offering a girl berries, unaware that they were poisonous. It is claimed that before the dream he did not intend to produce the video and did not want any special treatment over other possible producers for being in the band, thus submitting the idea anonymously.

Filmed mostly in the Los Angeles Theatre, which opened in 1931, the video opens with a gray-haired, gray-clothed, and gray-skinned boy shooting a red bird with a slingshot in an alleyway, after which the song starts. It then switches to the band members in dark suits in the theatre's forestage performing music for a play, similar to an orchestra. Based on a theme of life, death, and reincarnation, the play revolves around two lovers, a man in a dark suit and a woman in a red dress, who are shown both as children and as adults. As the music reaches its climax, the woman collapses after eating a red berry and the man screams in grief. The video closes with an intense scene of a woman giving birth in a hospital room, followed by a shot of a newborn baby wrapped in red cloth. The color red significantly links the bird, the girl, the woman, and the baby in a cycle of rebirth.

Tankian described the theatre, "It's an amazing old theater that is due for renovation. I'm glad they haven't renovated it yet, because it has the right character for what we were looking for. It has a fairy tale vibe."

== Track listing ==
CD single
No.	Title	Lyrics	Music	Length
1.	"Question!" (album version)	Tankian	Tankian, Malakian	3:20
2.	"Sugar" (explicit live version)	Tankian	Malakian, Odadjian	3:54

Maxi CD single
No.	Title	Lyrics	Music	Length
1.	"Question!" (album version)	Tankian	Tankian, Malakian	3:20
2.	"Forest" (explicit live version)	Tankian	Malakian	5:11
3.	"Prison Song" (explicit live version)	Tankian, Malakian	Malakian	3:27
4.	"Question!" (live video)	Tankian	Tankian, Malakian	3:25

DVD single
No.	Title	Lyrics	Music	Length
1.	"Question!" (concept video)	Tankian	Tankian, Malakian	3:48
2.	"B.Y.O.B." (concept video)	Tankian, Malakian	Malakian	4:17
3.	"Sugar" (explicit live version)	Tankian	Malakian, Odadjian	3:54
4.	"B.Y.O.B." (explicit live from Astoria)	Malakian, Tankian	Malakian	4:19

== Personnel ==
System of a Down

- Serj Tankian – lead vocals, acoustic guitar
- Daron Malakian – guitar, backing vocals
- Shavo Odadjian – bass
- John Dolmayan – drums, percussion

Additional personnel

- Marc Mann – string arrangements

Production

- Rick Rubin – production
- Andy Wallace – mixing
- David Schiffman – engineering
- Jason Lader – editing
- Dana Neilsen – editing
- Phillip Broussard – engineering assistance
- John O'Mahony – Pro Tools engineering
- Steve Sisco – mixing assistance
- Joe Peluso – mixing assistance
- Vartan Malakian – artwork
- Brandy Flower – graphic design

== Charts ==
=== Weekly charts ===
Weekly chart performance for "Question!"
Chart (2005)	Peak position
Canada Rock Top 30 (Radio & Records)	29
Hungary (Single Top 40)	7
Ireland (IRMA)	47
Scotland Singles (OCC)	39
UK Singles (OCC)	41
UK Rock & Metal (OCC)	3
US Bubbling Under Hot 100 (Billboard)	2
US Alternative Airplay (Billboard)	9
US Mainstream Rock (Billboard)	7

=== Year-end charts ===
Year-end chart performance for "Question!"
Chart (2005)	Position
US Mainstream Rock Tracks (Billboard)	32
US Modern Rock Tracks (Billboard)	44

== Certifications ==
Certifications for "Question!"
Region	Certification	Certified units/sales
United States (RIAA)	Gold	500,000^{‡}
^{‡} Sales+streaming figures based on certification alone.
