= B.Y.O.B. (song) =

2005 single by System of a Down

Single by System of a Down

from the album Mezmerize
- Released: March 28, 2005
- Genre: Thrash metal
- Length: 4:15
- Label: American; Columbia
- Composer: Daron Malakian
- Lyricists: Daron Malakian; Serj Tankian
- Producers: Rick Rubin; Daron Malakian

System of a Down singles chronology
| "Boom!" (2003) | "B.Y.O.B." (2005) | "Question!" (2005) |

Music video
- "B.Y.O.B." on YouTube

"B.Y.O.B." ("Bring Your Own Bombs") is a song by Armenian-American heavy metal band System of a Down. It was released in March 2005 as the lead single from their fourth studio album, Mezmerize. Like their earlier song "Boom!", it was written as a protest against the Iraq War. The song reached number 27 on the US Billboard Hot 100, marking the band's highest-charting and only top 40 hit.

== Music video ==
Directed by Jake Nava, the music video for "B.Y.O.B." depicts an army of soldiers marching through the streets, wearing paintball masks with television screens projecting words like "Die," "Truth," "Obey," and "Buy." The band members perform in the middle of the street. During the chorus, the band is shown playing inside a nightclub. Midway through the video, co-lead vocalist Daron Malakian screams the lyrics as the soldiers storm the nightclub and force everyone to put on the masks, which display images of television shows and war. At the end of the video, the band members are shown wearing the masks, which display static.

== Songwriting legal case ==
Casey Chaos claimed to have helped write the song in 2002, and Malakian offered him a 2% royalties credit. When Chaos asked for more, the offer was rescinded. Chaos subsequently sold a 50% interest in the song to Maxwood Music Ltd. However, in 2010 a Manhattan court ruled Malakian and Tankian to be the sole writers of the song.

== Accolades ==
- "B.Y.O.B." won the "Best Hard Rock Performance" category at the 2006 Grammy Awards.

== Track listing ==
CD single

| No. | Title | Lyrics | Music | Length |
|---|---|---|---|---|
| 1. | "B.Y.O.B." (Explicit Album version) | Tankian; Malakian | Malakian | 4:15 |
| 2. | "Forest" (Explicit Live version) | Tankian; Malakian | Malakian | 5:12 |
| 3. | "Prison Song" (Explicit Live version) | Tankian; Malakian | Malakian | 3:32 |
| 4. | "Sugar" (Explicit Live version) | Tankian | Odadjian; Malakian | 4:00 |

- The live tracks were recorded at the Big Day Out 2005 festival.

Digital download [First version]

| No. | Title | Lyrics | Music | Length |
|---|---|---|---|---|
| 1. | "B.Y.O.B." | Tankian; Malakian | Malakian | 4:15 |

7" single • digital download [Second version]

| No. | Title | Lyrics | Music | Length |
|---|---|---|---|---|
| 1. | "B.Y.O.B." | Tankian; Malakian | Malakian | 4:15 |
| 2. | "Cigaro" | Tankian; Malakian | Malakian | 2:11 |

== Personnel ==
System of a Down

- Serj Tankian – vocals, keyboards
- Daron Malakian – vocals, guitars, bass (uncredited)
- Shavo Odadjian – bass (credited but does not perform)
- John Dolmayan – drums, percussion

Production

- Rick Rubin – production
- Andy Wallace – mixing
- David Schiffman – engineering
- Jason Lader – editing
- Dana Neilsen – editing
- Phillip Broussard – engineering assistance
- John O'Mahony – Pro Tools engineering
- Steve Sisco – mixing assistance
- Joe Peluso – mixing assistance

Additional personnel

- Marc Mann – string arrangements
- Vartan Malakian – artwork
- Brandy Flower – graphic design

== Charts ==
=== Weekly charts ===
Weekly chart performance for "B.Y.O.B."
| Chart (2005) | Peak position |
|---|---|
| Australia (ARIA) | 42 |
| Canada Rock Top 30 (Radio & Records) | 28 |
| UK Singles Downloads (Official Charts) | 26 |
| US Billboard Hot 100 | 27 |
| US Alternative Airplay (Billboard) | 4 |
| US Mainstream Rock Airplay (Billboard) | 4 |

=== Year-end charts ===
Year-end chart performance for "B.Y.O.B."
| Chart (2005) | Position |
|---|---|
| US Mainstream Rock Tracks (Billboard) | 9 |
| US Modern Rock Tracks (Billboard) | 10 |

== Certifications ==
Certifications for "B.Y.O.B."
| Region | Certification | Certified units/sales |
|---|---|---|
| Germany (BVMI) | Gold | 150,000^{‡} |
| Italy (FIMI) | Gold | 25,000^{‡} |
| New Zealand (RMNZ) | Platinum | 30,000^{‡} |
| Spain (Promusicae) | Gold | 30,000^{‡} |
| United Kingdom (BPI) | Gold | 400,000^{‡} |
| United States (RIAA) | 3× Platinum | 3,000,000^{‡} |
Ringtone / Mastertone
| United States (RIAA) | Platinum | 1,000,000^{*} |
^{*} Sales figures based on certification alone.^{‡} Sales+streaming figures based on certification alone.

== See also ==
- List of anti-war songs
