= Hypnotize (album) =

Studio album by System of a Down
- Released: November 22, 2005
- Studios: The Mansion and Akademie Mathematique of Philosophical Sound Research (Los Angeles)
- Genres: Nu metal; alternative metal; art rock
- Length: 39:40
- Labels: American; Columbia
- Producers: Rick Rubin; Daron Malakian

System of a Down chronology
Mezmerize (2005)	Hypnotize (2005)

Singles from Hypnotize
- 1. "Hypnotize" Released: October 11, 2005; 2. "Lonely Day" Released: April 17, 2006

Hypnotize is the fifth studio album by American heavy metal band System of a Down. It was released on November 22, 2005, six months after the release of its companion album Mezmerize. Both Mezmerize and Hypnotize debuted at number 1 on the Billboard 200 chart, making System of a Down one of four artists at the time, along with the Beatles, 2Pac and DMX to have two albums top the chart in the same year.

The album was positively received by critics, praised primarily for its songwriting.

== Background ==
The album is a companion album with System of a Down's previous album, Mezmerize. After that album's release, the band went on an extensive tour, touring with the Mars Volta and Bad Acid Trip.

Both albums were recorded together, and their cover art, drawn by guitarist Daron Malakian's father, Vartan Malakian, was designed to connect the two separate album covers.

== Release ==
The album was released on November 22, 2005, and was an immediate hit, topping the Billboard 200, selling 320,000 copies in its first week in the United States, and charting in the Top 40 in over 20 countries. The album was certified Gold and Platinum by the RIAA on December 13, 2005, and has also received various other sales certifications. Since its release, Hypnotize has sold 8 million copies worldwide.

== Reception ==
Professional ratings
Aggregate scores
Source	Rating
Metacritic	78/100
Review scores
Source	Rating
AllMusic	4.5/5 stars
Entertainment Weekly	B+
The Guardian	4/5 stars
Pitchfork	7.9/10
Playlouder	4.5/5 stars
PopMatters	6/10
Rolling Stone	3.5/5 stars
Stylus Magazine	C
Sputnikmusic	4/5 stars
USA Today	3/4 stars

Hypnotize received generally positive reviews. Writing for Entertainment Weekly, Tom Sinclair would write, "When it comes to freakazoid operatic metal, no one beats System of a Down." he continued by saying, "[T]hey're flaunting a heretofore underexplored sensitive side, offsetting their trademark stampeding riffology with flashes of delicate lyricism," ultimately rating the album a B+.

In a slightly less positive review, Rolling Stone rated the album a 3.5 out of 5, writing, "System of a Down nearly made the no-contest hard-rock album of 2005. Instead, they have released a double album, Mezmerize/Hypnotize, in six-month chunks -- two separate records that each fall shy of pulverizing perfection and appear to be conceptually bound by little more than speed, fuzz and nonstop bile."

Spin ranked the album No. 20 in their list of the best albums of 2005.

== Track listing ==
All lyrics written by Daron Malakian and Serj Tankian, except where noted. All music written by Malakian, except where noted.

No.	Title	Lyrics	Music	Length
1.	"Attack"			3:06
2.	"Dreaming"		Malakian, Shavo Odadjian	3:59
3.	"Kill Rock 'n Roll"	Malakian		2:27
4.	"Hypnotize"			3:09
5.	"Stealing Society"			2:58
6.	"Tentative"			3:36
7.	"U-Fig"		Malakian, Odadjian	2:55
8.	"Holy Mountains"			5:28
9.	"Vicinity of Obscenity"	Tankian	Tankian, Malakian	2:51
10.	"She's Like Heroin"	Malakian		2:44
11.	"Lonely Day"	Malakian		2:47
12.	"Soldier Side"	Malakian		3:40

=== DualDisc edition – DVD side ===
- Entire album in enhanced stereo
- The Recording of Mezmerize / Hypnotize
- "B.Y.O.B." and "Question!" videos

== Personnel ==
All personnel credits for Hypnotize are adapted from the album's liner notes, except where noted.

System of a Down

- Daron Malakian – vocals, guitars, bass (uncredited), keyboards (uncredited); production
- Serj Tankian – vocals, keyboards
- Shavo Odadjian – bass
- John Dolmayan – drums

Additional musicians

- Marc Mann – string arrangements

Technical personnel

- Rick Rubin – production
- Andy Wallace – mixing
- David Schiffman – engineering
- Jason Lader – editing
- Dana Nielsen – editing
- Phillip Broussard – engineering assistance
- John O'Mahony – mix Pro Tools engineering
- Steve Sisco – mixing assistance
- Joe Peluso – mixing assistance
- Lindsay Chase – album production coordinator
- Braden Asher – album production coordinator
- Vlado Meller – mastering

Creative personnel

- Vartan Malakian – artwork
- System of a Down – design
- Brandy Flower – design

Vocals

- "Attack": Serj Tankian (main), Daron Malakian (second voice)
- "Dreaming": Tankian (main - verses) Malakian (main - bridge)
- "Kill Rock 'n Roll": Tankian and Malakian (both main)
- "Hypnotize": Tankian and Malakian (both main)
- "Stealing Society": Tankian (main - verses) Malakian (main - bridge)
- "Tentative": Tankian (main), Malakian (second voice)
- "U-Fig": Tankian (main - verses & chorus) Malakian (main - chorus)
- "Holy Mountains": Tankian (main), Malakian (second voice)
- "Vicinity of Obscenity": Tankian
- "She's Like Heroin": Malakian (main), Tankian (second voice)
- "Lonely Day": Malakian (main), Tankian (second voice)
- "Soldier Side": Tankian and Malakian (both main)
- Recording location: The Mansion in Laurel Canyon, Los Angeles and Akademie Mathematique of Philosophical Sound Research, Los Angeles
- Mixed at Soundtrack Studios, New York City and Enterprise Studios, Los Angeles
- Mastered by Vlado Meller at Sony Music Studios, New York City

== Charts ==
=== Weekly charts ===
Weekly chart performance for Hypnotize
Chart (2005)	Peak position
Australian Albums (ARIA)	3
Austrian Albums (Ö3 Austria)	3
Belgian Albums (Ultratop Flanders)	17
Belgian Albums (Ultratop Wallonia)	13
Canadian Albums (Billboard)	1
Danish Albums (Hitlisten)	11
Dutch Albums (Album Top 100)	15
Finnish Albums (Suomen virallinen lista)	1
French Albums (SNEP)	4
German Albums (Offizielle Top 100)	4
Hungarian Albums (MAHASZ)	35
Irish Albums (IRMA)	10
Italian Albums (FIMI)	10
Japanese Albums (Oricon)	17
New Zealand Albums (RMNZ)	1
Norwegian Albums (VG-lista)	4
Polish Albums (ZPAV)	16
Portuguese Albums (AFP)	15
Scottish Albums (Official Charts)	12
Spanish Albums (Promusicae)	26
Swedish Albums (Sverigetopplistan)	3
Swiss Albums (Schweizer Hitparade)	4
UK Albums (Official Charts)	11
US Billboard 200	1

=== Year-end charts ===
2005 year-end chart performance for Hypnotize
Chart (2005)	Position
Australian Albums (ARIA)	89
Austrian Albums (Ö3 Austria)	58
French Albums (SNEP)	124
Italian Albums (FIMI)	100
New Zealand Albums (RMNZ)	38
UK Albums (OCC)	172
Worldwide Albums (IFPI)	42

2006 year-end chart performance for Hypnotize
Chart (2006)	Position
Austrian Albums (Ö3 Austria)	64
French Albums (SNEP)	156
US Billboard 200	41

== Certifications ==
Certifications and sales for Hypnotize
Region	Certification	Certified units/sales
Australia (ARIA)	Gold	35,000^{^}
Austria (IFPI Austria)	Gold	15,000^{*}
Denmark (IFPI Danmark)	Platinum	20,000^{‡}
Finland (Musiikkituottajat)	Platinum	31,990
Germany (BVMI)	Platinum	200,000^{‡}
Ireland (IRMA)	Platinum	15,000^{^}
Italy (FIMI) sales since 2009	Gold	25,000^{‡}
New Zealand (RMNZ)	Platinum	15,000^{^}
Poland (ZPAV)	Platinum	20,000^{‡}
Russia (NFPF)	Gold	10,000^{*}
Switzerland (IFPI Switzerland)	Gold	20,000^{^}
United Kingdom (BPI)	Gold	100,000^{^}
United States (RIAA)	Platinum	1,000,000^{^}
^{*} Sales figures based on certification alone.^{^} Shipments figures based on certification alone.^{‡} Sales+streaming figures based on certification alone.
