= System of a Down =

Armenian-American metal band

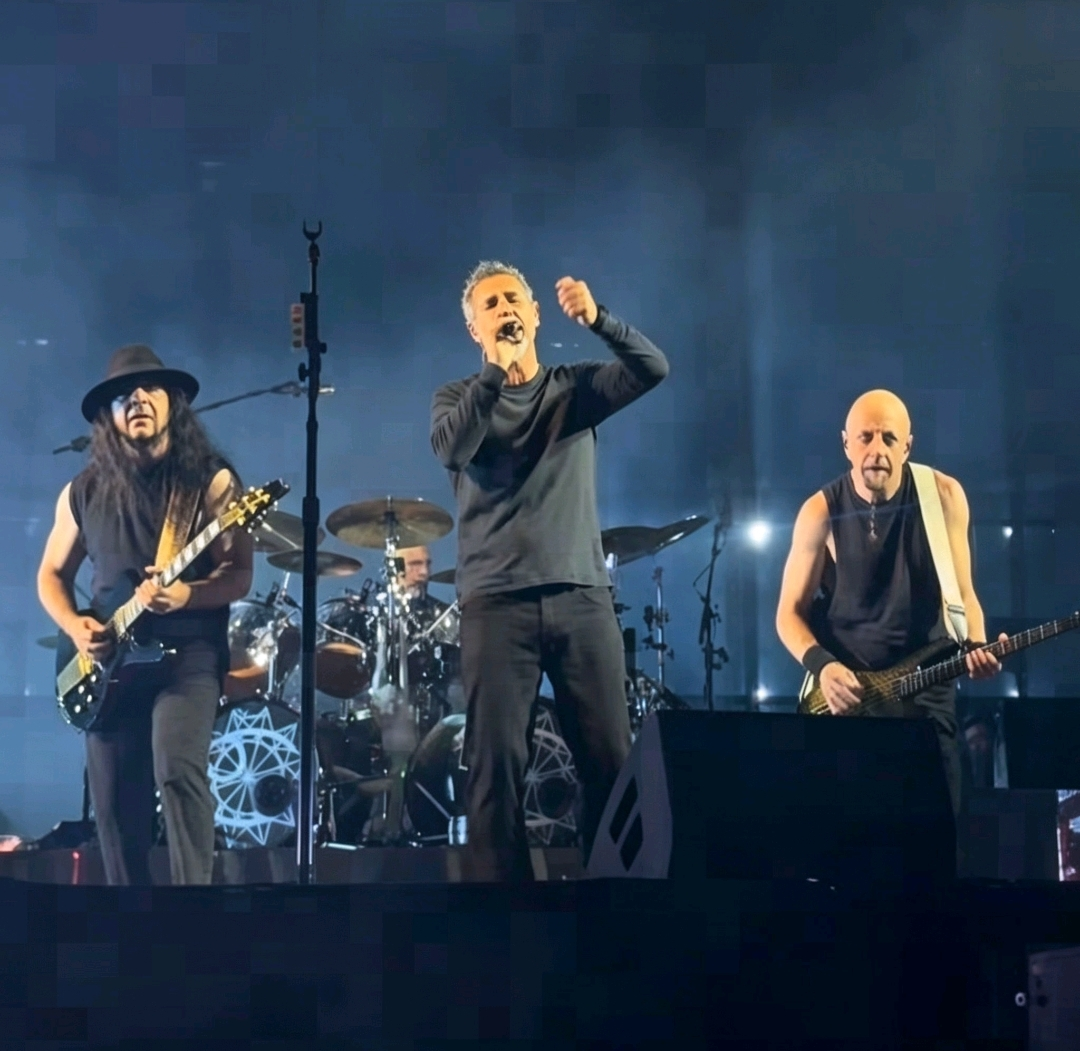
- System of a Down performing in Mexico City, in 2026. From left to right: Daron Malakian, John Dolmayan, Serj Tankian, and Shavo Odadjian.

Background information
- Origin: Glendale, California, U.S.
- Genres: Alternative metal; nu metal; hard rock; progressive metal
- Works: Discography
- Years active: 1994–2006; 2010–present
- Labels: American; Columbia
- Spinoffs: Daron Malakian and Scars on Broadway; Seven Hours After Violet
- Spinoff of: Soil
- Members: Serj Tankian; Daron Malakian; Shavo Odadjian; John Dolmayan
- Past members: Andy Khachaturian
- Website: systemofadown.com

System of a Down is an Armenian-American heavy metal band formed in Glendale, California, in 1994. Since 1997, the band has consisted of founding members Serj Tankian (lead vocals, keyboards), Daron Malakian (guitar, vocals), and Shavo Odadjian (bass); along with John Dolmayan (drums), who replaced original drummer Andy Khachaturian.

The band achieved commercial success with the release of five studio albums, three of which debuted at number one on the US Billboard 200. System of a Down has been nominated for four Grammy Awards, and their song "B.Y.O.B." won a Grammy Award for Best Hard Rock Performance in 2006. Known for their politically charged lyrics, many of their songs address social and political issues, such as the anti-war message in "B.Y.O.B." and criticism of the prison industrial complex and the war on drugs in "Prison Song." The band went on hiatus in 2006 and reunited in 2010. Other than two new songs in 2020 ("Protect the Land" and "Genocidal Humanoidz"), System of a Down has not released any new material since the Mezmerize and Hypnotize albums in 2005. The band has sold over 12 million records worldwide, while two of their singles, "Aerials" and "Hypnotize", reached number one on Billboard's Alternative Songs chart.

All members of System of a Down are of Armenian descent, either born to Armenian immigrants or immigrants themselves.

== History ==
=== Soil (1992–1994) ===
Serj Tankian and Daron Malakian attended Rose and Alex Pilibos Armenian School as children. Due to their eight-year age difference, they did not meet until 1992 while working on separate projects at the same recording studio. They formed a band named Soil with Tankian on vocals and keyboards, Malakian on vocals and guitar, Dave Hakopyan (who later played in the band The Apex Theory/Mt. Helium) on bass and Domingo "Dingo" Laranio on drums. The band hired Shavo Odadjian (another Rose and Alex Pilibos alumnus) as manager, although he eventually joined Soil on second guitar. In 1994, after only one live show at the Roxy and one jam session recording, Hakopyan and Laranio left the band.

=== Demo tapes and signing (1994–1997) ===
After Soil split up, Tankian, Odadjian, and Malakian formed a new band, System of a Down. The group took its name from a poem that Malakian had written titled "Victims of a Down". The word "victims" was changed to "system" because Odadjian believed that it would appeal to a much wider audience and also because the group wanted their records to be alphabetically shelved closer to their musical heroes, Slayer. Odadjian switched from guitar to bass and passed on his managerial duties to Velvet Hammer Music and Management Group and its founder David "Beno" Benveniste. The band recruited drummer Ontronik "Andy" Khachaturian, an old school friend of Malakian and Odadjian who had played with Malakian in a band called Snowblind during their teens.

In early 1995, System of a Down performed under the name Soil at the Cafe Club Fais Do-Do, a nightclub in Los Angeles. Shortly after the event, System of a Down made what is known as Untitled 1995 Demo Tape, which was not commercially released, but eventually appeared on file-sharing networks around the time of the band's success with Toxicity about six years later. Demo Tape 2 was released in 1996. At the beginning of 1997, System of a Down recorded their final publicly released demo tape, Demo Tape 3. In mid-1997, drummer Khachaturian left the band when he broke his hand after punching a wall during an argument, consigning him to a year of recovery. He was replaced by John Dolmayan, who the band knew after sharing a rehearsal space with his band. Khachaturian subsequently co-founded The Apex Theory, which included former Soil bassist Dave Hakopyan.

The band's first official and professionally recorded song was on a collection called Hay Enk ("We're Armenian" in English), an Armenian genocide recognition compilation in 1997. After playing at notable Hollywood clubs such as the Whisky a Go Go and Viper Room, the band caught attention of producer Rick Rubin, who asked them to keep in touch. Showing great interest, the group recorded Demo Tape 4 near the end of 1997, specifically to be sent to record companies. Rubin signed the group to his American/Columbia Records, with the band celebrating the signing with a performance at The Roxy Theatre with Human Waste Project on September 12, 1997. Afterward, System began laying down tracks that would eventually be released on their debut album with engineer Sylvia Massy. "I loved them," Rubin recalled. "They were my favorite band, but I didn't think anyone was going to like them apart from a small, likeminded group of people like me who were crazy. No one was waiting for an Armenian heavy metal band. It had to be so good that it transcended all of that."

In 1997, the group won the Best Signed Band Award from the Rock City Awards.

=== Self-titled album (1998–2000) ===
In June 1998, System of a Down released their debut album, System of a Down. They enjoyed moderate success as their first singles "Sugar" and "Spiders" became radio favorites and the music videos for both songs were frequently aired on MTV. After the release of the album, the band toured extensively, opening for Slayer on the Diabolus in Musica tour, behind Clutch, before making their way to the second stage of Ozzfest. Following Ozzfest, they toured with Fear Factory and Incubus before headlining the Sno-Core Tour with Puya, Mr. Bungle, The Cat and Incubus providing support.

In November 1998, System of a Down appeared on South Park's Chef Aid album, providing the music for the song "Will They Die 4 You?" Near the end of the song, Tankian can be heard saying, "Why must we kill our own kind?" a line that would later be used in the song "Boom!" Although System of a Down is credited on the album, South Park character Chef does not introduce them as he does most of the other artists featured on the record.

=== Toxicity and Steal This Album! (2001–2003) ===
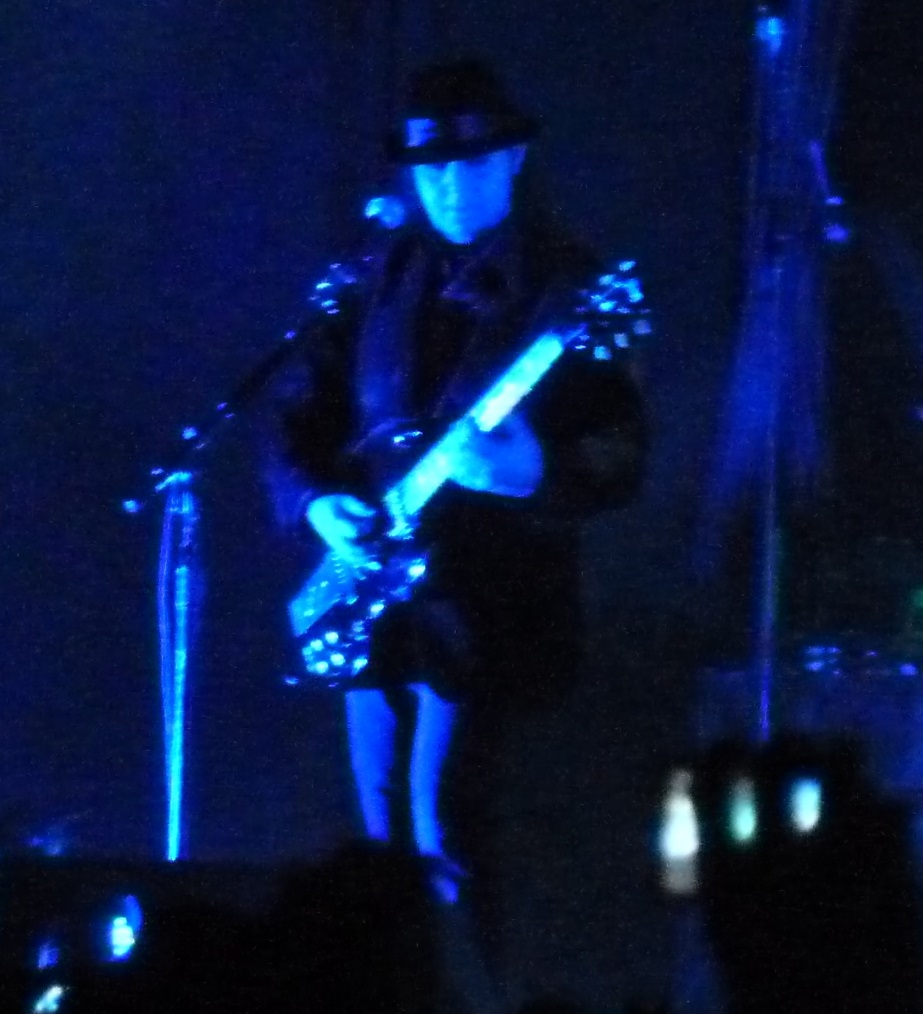
Guitarist Daron Malakian met Serj Tankian for the first time in 1992 before forming the band a couple of years later.

On September 3, 2001, System of a Down planned to launch their second album at a free concert in Hollywood as a "thank you" to fans. To a parking lot built for 3,500 people, about 10,000 more came, prompting the fire marshal to cancel without notice at the last minute. Fans waited for more than an hour for the group to appear, but when a banner hanging at the back of the stage that read "System of a Down" was removed by security, the audience rushed the stage, destroying all the band's touring gear (approximately $30,000 worth of equipment) and began to riot, throwing rocks at police, breaking windows, and knocking over portable toilets. The riot lasted six hours, during which six arrests were made. The band's manager, David "Beno" Benveniste, later said that the riot could have been avoided if the group had been permitted to perform or had they been allowed to make a statement at the concert regarding the cancellation. System of a Down's scheduled in-store performance the next day was cancelled to prevent a similar riot.

The group's big break arrived when their second album, Toxicity, debuted at No. 1 on the American and Canadian charts. The album eventually achieved 7× Platinum certification in the United States. It was still on top in America during the week of the 9/11 attacks and the political environment caused by the attacks added to the controversy surrounding the album's hit single "Chop Suey!"; the song was taken off the radio as it contained politically sensitive lyrics according to the 2001 Clear Channel memorandum at the time such as "I don't think you trust in my self-righteous suicide". Regardless, the video gained constant play on MTV as did the album's second single, "Toxicity". Even with the controversy surrounding "Chop Suey!" (which earned a Grammy nomination), System of a Down still received constant airplay in the United States throughout late 2001 and 2002 with "Toxicity" and "Aerials". In May 2006, VH1 listed "Toxicity" in the number 14 slot in the 40 Greatest Metal Songs.

In 2001, the band went on tour with Slipknot throughout the United States. Following a performance in Grand Rapids, Michigan, Odadjian was allegedly harassed, ethnically intimidated, and was physically assaulted by security guards backstage, who then dragged him out of the venue. Odadjian received medical attention from police and later filed a suit against the security company. Despite the incident, the tour was a success and System of a Down and Slipknot went on the Pledge of Allegiance Tour together with Rammstein in 2001.

In late 2001, unreleased tracks from the Toxicity sessions made their way onto the Internet. This collection of tracks was dubbed Toxicity II by fans. The group released a statement that the tracks were unfinished material and subsequently released the final versions of the songs as their third album, Steal This Album!, which was released in November 2002. Steal This Album! resembled a burnable CD that was marked with a felt-tip marker. About 50,000 special copies of the album with different CD designs were also released, each designed by a different member of the band. The name of the album is a reference to Abbie Hoffman's counter-culture book, Steal This Book, as well as a message to those who leaked the songs onto the Internet. The song "Innervision" was released as a promo single and received constant airplay on alternative radio. A video for "Boom!" was filmed with director Michael Moore as a protest against the War in Iraq.

=== Mezmerize, Hypnotize, band hiatus and side projects (2004–2008) ===
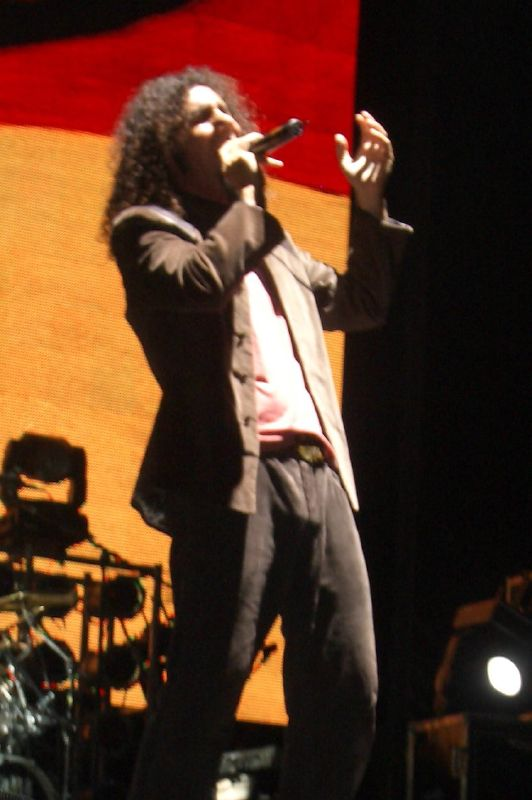
Serj Tankian has gained a reputation for his large vocal range along with his unusual delivery.

In 2004, the group recorded the follow-up to Steal This Album! a double album, which they released in separate installments six months apart. The releases notably included album cover artwork by Malakian's father, Vartan Malakian, and were designed to connect the two separate album covers. The first album, Mezmerize, was released on May 17, 2005, to favorable reviews by critics. It debuted at No. 1 in the United States, Canada, Australia and all around the world, making it System of a Down's second No. 1 album. First-week sales exceeded 800,000 copies worldwide. The lead single "B.Y.O.B.", which questions the integrity of military recruiting in America, worked its way up the Billboard Modern Rock and Mainstream Rock charts, and would go on to win the 2006 Grammy Award for Best Hard Rock Performance. "Question!" was released as the next single, with Shavo Odadjian co-directing the music video. Following the album's release, the band toured extensively throughout the United States and Canada with The Mars Volta and Bad Acid Trip supporting.

The second part of the double album, Hypnotize, was released on November 22, 2005. Like Mezmerize, it debuted at No. 1 in the US. With this release, System of a Down joined The Beatles and rappers 2Pac and DMX as the fourth artist ever to have two studio albums debut at No. 1 in the same year. "Hypnotize" was released as the lead single and was followed by "Lonely Day" and "Vicinity of Obscenity", all three of which were also released as EPs, including several B-sides from 1999 to 2000, such as a collaboration with the Wu-Tang Clan, titled "Shame". "Kill Rock 'N Roll" was released as the final promotional single.

Whereas on System of a Down's previous albums, most of the lyrics were written and sung by Tankian and the music was co-written by Tankian and Malakian (and sometimes Odadjian), much of the music and lyrics on Mezmerize/Hypnotize were written by Malakian, who also took on a much more dominant role as vocalist on both albums, often leaving Tankian providing keyboards and backing vocals.

System of a Down's song "Lonely Day" was nominated for Best Hard Rock Performance in the 49th Grammy Awards in 2007 but lost to "Woman" by Wolfmother.

A biography of the band entitled System of a Down: Right Here in Hollywood, written by Ben Myers, was published in May 2006, later being published in the U.S. in 2007 through The Disinformation Company. Additionally in 2006, concert footage and interviews with the band concerning the importance of helping create awareness and recognition of the Armenian genocide were featured in the film Screamers, directed by Carla Garapedian. An interview with Tankian's grandfather, a survivor of the genocide, was also included in the film as well as Tankian's and Dolmayan's meeting with then-Speaker of the House Dennis Hastert during which the two musicians campaigned for the United States government's official recognition of the genocide. Footage of Tankian and Dolmayan marching with protesters outside the Turkish embassy in Washington, D.C., was also used in Screamers.

In May 2006, the band announced they were going on hiatus. Malakian confirmed the break would probably last a few years, which Odadjian specified as a minimum of three years in an interview with Guitar magazine. He told MTV, "We're not breaking up. If that was the case, we wouldn't be doing this Ozzfest. We're going to take a very long break after Ozzfest and do our own things. We've done System for over ten years, and I think it's healthy to take some rest." System of a Down's final performance before their separation took place on August 13, 2006, in West Palm Beach, Florida. "Tonight will be the last show we play for a long time together," Malakian told the crowd during Sunday's last performance. "We'll be back. We just don't know when."

The band members continued with their own projects; Malakian formed a band called Scars on Broadway, which was joined by Dolmayan. After one self-titled album, the project became dormant and Dolmayan left the band. It released the long-awaited sophomore album in 2018, titled Dictator, under the name "Daron Malakian and Scars on Broadway". Dolmayan, alongside working with Scars on Broadway, formed his own band, Indicator. Dolmayan has also opened Torpedo Comics, an online comic bookstore. Odadjian pursued his project with RZA of Wu-Tang Clan, a hip-hop group named AcHoZeN, worked on his urSESSION website/record label and performed as a member of funk legend George Clinton's backing band. Meanwhile, Tankian opted for a solo career and released his debut solo album Elect the Dead in the autumn of 2007. He has continued releasing solo albums, recording them almost entirely by himself even after System of a Down had begun to reunite for tours.

=== Reunion and touring (2010–2020) ===
On November 29, 2010, following several weeks of Internet rumors, System of a Down officially announced that they would be reuniting for a string of large European festival dates in June 2011. Among the announced tour dates included UK's Download Festival, Switzerland's Greenfield Festival, Germany's Rock am Ring/Rock im Park, Sweden's Metaltown, Austria's Nova Rock Festival and Finland's Provinssirock. The reunion tour commenced on May 10, 2011, in Edmonton, Alberta. System's first tour through Mexico and South America began on September 28, 2011, in Mexico City, ending in Santiago, Chile on October 7, 2011. From late February to early March 2012, they headlined five dates at Soundwave festival. The band have continued playing around the world. On August 11 and 12, 2012, they played the Heavy MTL and Heavy T.O. music festivals in Montreal and Toronto respectively. In August 2013, System of a Down played at the UK's Reading and Leeds Festivals, among other festivals and venues that year.

System of a Down played their only 2013 U.S. performance at the Hollywood Bowl on July 29; tickets sold out hours after going on sale on March 22. On November 23, 2014, System of a Down announced the Wake Up The Souls Tour to commemorate the 100th anniversary of the Armenian genocide. The tour included a free concert in Republic Square in Yerevan, Armenia, on April 23, 2015, their first show in the country.

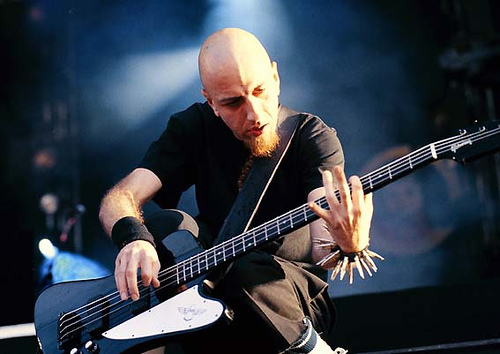
Bassist Shavo Odadjian

In a November 2016 interview with Kerrang!, drummer John Dolmayan revealed that System of a Down was working on more than a dozen songs for their follow-up to the Mezmerize and Hypnotize albums. Although he stated that the band does not know when the album will be released, he added that, "I want everyone on board and feeling good about it. That's what we're trying to accomplish right now. There's a tremendous amount of pressure on us, though, because it's been 11 years—at least 12 by the time it comes out."

In a video Q&A session with fans on July 2, 2017, Shavo Odadjian was asked about the status of the next album and he responded, "I'm waiting for a new album too. It's not happening. I don't know. I don't know when it's gonna be. Not right now." In a December 2017 interview with Rolling Stone, Serj Tankian said that System of a Down wrote some new material but was uncertain of what to do with it. He then said that he doesn't want to commit to a new album due to the lack of committing to longform touring.

Malakian singled Tankian out as the reason no new album had yet been released. Tankian detailed his view of the band's past and present conflicts and their overall situation, saying, "As we couldn't see eye to eye on all these points we decided to put aside the idea of a record altogether for the time being." Dolmayan blamed all of the members due to the personal and creative differences that have been preventing them from recording a new studio album. Tankian also expressed uncertainty on whether the new album would be made or not but did not rule out the possibility. He went on to describe how he imagined the album sounding: "It's gotta be organic, it's gotta feel right in every way."

Odadjian said that the band has material written from "like the last 10, 12 years", but expressed uncertainty on if it would form into a System of a Down album or not. He also said that Malakian and Tankian have visceral differences on what the album should sound like, and that the band's inner tension had been building far longer than fans would be aware, despite having love and respect for one another nonetheless. He would later say that there was no extant conflict between the members, expressing confidence that System of a Down would eventually record a new album and claimed that they have material written that would be their best to date. Tankian denied any talk of the band recording a new album.

Malakian explained that there was a mixture between the matter of different creative perspectives for the band's hesitation to record a new studio album and the lack of desire to tour. He did not dismiss a possible new album in the more distant future. He felt that the fans do not care that the band wasn't making an album, "but I think a lot of the fans just want an album." He expressed hopes that the members would get together and record new music but was content with the direction of his band Scars on Broadway, noting the members' good friendship, "But at the same time, I don't see that happening anytime soon that we're all going to get together and make a new System of a Down album." Malakian said that Tankian and the rest of the band members have been unable to come to an agreement over how to go about making new music, but insisted that there was no negativity between them.

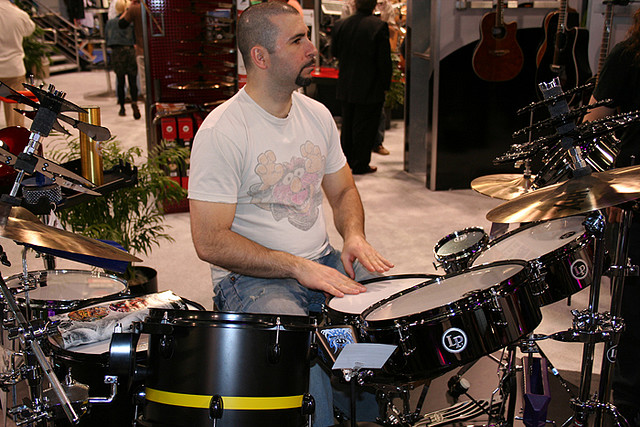
Drummer John Dolmayan

Despite System of a Down's ability to perform live, Odadjian expressed disappointment at their inability to record new music, explaining that there has been new material written by the other members in the form of a possible new album. Without Tankian's presence, no recordings had been made. He questioned why the band still has not made an album, citing creative differences as the problem. With the lack of commitment to record new music, Tankian was open to releasing a collection of previously unreleased System of a Down songs from past recording sessions if his bandmates agreed.

Dolmayan had started in 2014 a Kickstarter to fund a cover project, titled "These Grey Men", alongside friend James Hazley. In 2020, he released the first single, a cover of Radiohead's "Street Spirit", on January 23. Avenged Sevenfold singer M. Shadows contributes vocals to the track; Tom Morello contributes the guitar solo at the song's close. The second single features Tankian in a cover of David Bowie's "Starman". The album, titled These Grey Men, was released on February 28, 2020. It consists of covers/reimaginations of other songs by artists such as Radiohead, AFI, Madonna, and Talking Heads, among others.

With the differences concerning the band members, Dolmayan became uncertain in wanting to make new music anymore. Although he did not want to put Tankian and Malakian at fault for the band's inability to record a new album, he said, "It takes four people to make this band, and it takes four people to unmake it. I think that we're all to blame. I could just blame Daron and Serj, because, quite frankly, they're the primary songwriters, so it's easy to blame them. But it's not just their fault. A lot of it is their fault, but it's not just their fault." In an interview, Dolmayan exclaimed that putting the band on hiatus was a grave mistake: "I never wanted System to take a hiatus. I think it was a disastrous move for us because we never reached our peak." Dolmayan believed that the band could have risen through the charts if they had just kept going. On December 17, 2020, Serj Tankian announced in a Rolling Stone interview that he would release an EP by the name of Elasticity under his own name. Tankian had planned to release the EP in October. Due to the COVID-19 pandemic, he released it in February 2021 instead. In the interview, he explained that the EP contains songs he had written for System of a Down that the band ultimately opted not to record.

=== Artsakh benefit singles and continued live performances (2020–present) ===
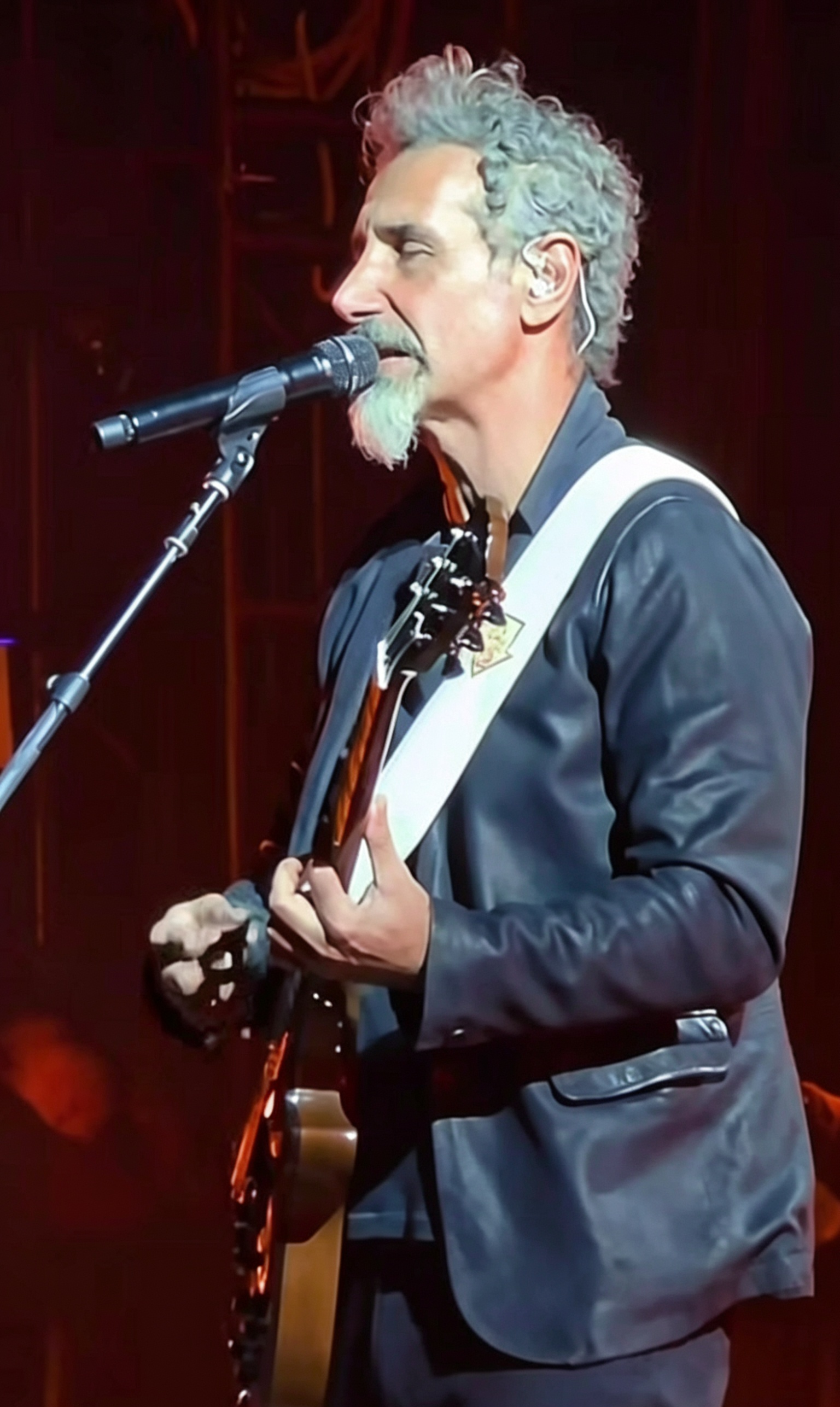
Serj Tankian playing with System of a Down in 2026.

On November 5, 2020, in response to the Second Nagorno-Karabakh War, System of a Down released their first songs in 15 years, "Protect the Land" and "Genocidal Humanoidz", both of which "speak of a dire and serious war being perpetrated upon our cultural homelands of Artsakh and Armenia." Music videos were made for both singles, and "Protect the Land" marks the band's first music video in 14 years, since "Lonely Day". Proceeds from the songs were to help Armenia Fund and for humanitarian needs of displaced families from the war.

As for a possible new album, Dolmayan told Rolling Stone, "If it was up to me, we'd have a new album every three years. But things aren't up to me. I'm at the mercy of my team, and although I fought for it for many years with band members, I've accepted that it is what it is. We do have five albums and [now] two songs. We've accomplished a lot in our careers. If it ends at that, so be it." In the same interview, Malakian claimed that "Protect the Land" and "Genocidal Humanoidz" were originally going to be released under his own band Scars on Broadway. As the conflict came to fruition, System of a Down came back to release them instead. Malakian also said he does not see the band making new music anytime soon, saying that the singles were a "one-off kind of thing". Shavo Odadjian spoke with Wall of Sound in a follow-up interview discussing the conception of the songs, stating, "It was amazing... Even though we have had our differences, when we're in there it's just like brothers making music together, like it all started." When asked if the two songs had inspired a new era of creativity for System of a Down, Tankian said to Triple J in December 2020, "I don't know, because right now we're focused on what's going on in Armenia. There's a huge humanitarian catastrophe. We're still focused on raising funds, raising awareness about this. Time will tell whether this leads to something else or not."

In January 2023, Dolmayan claimed that Tankian "hasn't really wanted to be in a band for a long time [...] and quite frankly, we probably should have parted ways around 2006. We tried to get together multiple times to make an album, but there were certain rules set in place that made it difficult to do so and maintain the integrity of what System of a Down stood for." Despite the major setback, he said the chemistry to play live together as a band is still great. On May 14 of the same year, System of a Down hosted their only live performance of 2023 as co-headliners of the Sick New World festival in Las Vegas.

In 2024, the band performed two gigs: in the former case, they made their second headline appearance in a row at Sick New World on April 27; in the latter one, they co-headlined (together with Deftones) a standalone concert at the Golden Gate Park in San Francisco, making it the first-ever ticketed concert to take place at the venue.

In May 2024, Tankian revealed in his memoir, "Down with the System," that back when System of a Down was on hiatus in 2005, he offered to step down and suggested the band find a new vocalist due to his back injury and disinterest in touring. Although the band did audition an unnamed singer without Tankian's knowledge, they discarded the idea and continued onward with their original vocalist. In 2025, though, the band launched a tour called "Wake Up!", with dates in Latin America for the first time in ten years and a few US and Canada shows. They later announced a European Tour for 2026 along two Sick New World shows.

In February 2025, Malakian gave his thoughts about making a new System of a Down album.

"I'm proud of the records. I don't live with any regret of anything like that, but it would have been nice to see where the band would have evolved if we kept putting music out. If we put out an album now, it's just so far away from [Hypnotize and Mezmerize], it doesn't continue the story to me. There was a time that [making a new System Of A Down record] might have been something I wanted. I'm not sure how much I want that anymore — I'm sure people won't be too happy to hear that from me. I'm not at the same place I was maybe 10 years ago."

— Daron Malakian (2025)

In July 2026, System of a Down announced a tour of Australia and New Zealand, supported by Faith No More. The tour is scheduled for January–February 2027.

On September 4, 2026, System of a Down released the B-side "Johnny" onto streaming, and is set to release their 25th anniversary album of Toxicity.

== Artistry ==
=== Lyrical themes ===
System of a Down's lyrics are often oblique or dadaist and have discussed topics such as drug abuse, politics and suicide. "Prison Song" criticizes the war on drugs whereas Rolling Stone describes "Roulette" as a "scared, wounded love letter". "Boom!", among the band's most straightforward and unambiguous songs, lambasts globalization and spending on bombs and armament. Commenting on the track "I-E-A-I-A-I-O", drummer John Dolmayan said it was inspired by an encounter he had with Knight Rider's actor David Hasselhoff in a liquor store in Los Angeles when he was around 12. On Mezmerize, "Cigaro" makes explicit references to phallic imagery and bureaucracy while "Violent Pornography" harshly views television and degradation of women. System of a Down's discontent toward the controversial Iraq War arises in "B.Y.O.B.", which is a double entendre reference to beer and bombs, containing the forthright lyric "Why don't presidents fight the war? Why do they always send the poor?", "Old School Hollywood" describes a celebrity baseball game. On their album Hypnotize, "Tentative" describes war, "Hypnotize" refers to the Tiananmen Square events, and "Lonely Day" describes angst. The album title Steal This Album! is a play on the book Steal This Book by left-wing political activist Abbie Hoffman. System of a Down's firm commitment for the Armenian genocide to be recognized appears in two songs: "P.L.U.C.K." and "Holy Mountains", which rank among the band's most political songs.

=== Musical style and classification ===
System of a Down's music is highly diverse and experimental. Loudwire stated the belief that the band were "probably the weirdest act to ever sell out arenas." Stephen Thomas Erlewine of AllMusic stated "Like many late-'90s metal bands System of a Down struck a balance between '80s underground thrash metal and metallic early-'90s alternative rockers like Jane's Addiction". Malakian once described their music "as if Slayer and the Beatles had a baby."

System of a Down's music has variously been termed alternative metal, nu metal, hard rock, progressive metal, heavy metal, thrash metal, art rock, and avant-garde metal. Malakian has stated that "We don't belong to any one scene" and that "I don't like the nu-metal drop-A 7-string guitar sound; it is not my thing, at least not yet." In interview with Mike Lancaster, he also said, "People always seem to feel the need to put us into a category, but we just don't fit into any category."

System of a Down's music is influenced by elements of numerous styles, including alternative rock, art rock, classic rock, gothic rock, hip-hop, jazz, various genres of metal including thrash metal and even Norwegian black metal, and Middle Eastern music. According to Tankian, "As far as arrangement and everything, [our music] is pretty much pop. To me, System of a Down isn't a progressive band. [...] But it's not a typical pop project, obviously. We definitely pay attention to the music to make sure that it's not something someone's heard before." The band's songs often employ droning notes, modulations, modes, and varying time signatures. According to Reverb.com: "These characteristics make SoaD one of the most progressive bands associated with nu metal."

The band has used a wide range of instruments, such as electric mandolins, baritone electric guitars, acoustic guitars, ouds, sitars, and twelve string guitars. According to Malakian, he would often write songs in E♭ tuning, which would later be changed to drop C tuning in order to be performed by the band. Malakian states that "For me, the drop-C tuning is right down the center. It has enough of the clarity and the crisp sound—most of our riffy stuff is done on the top two strings, anyway—but it's also thicker and ballsier."

=== Influences and comparison to other artists ===
System of a Down's influences include Middle Eastern music, Rush, Ozzy Osbourne, Black Sabbath, Led Zeppelin, Def Leppard, Scorpions, Morbid Angel, Death, Obituary, Eazy-E, N.W.A, Run-DMC, Umm Kulthum, Abdel Halim Hafez, The Kinks, the Bee Gees, Grateful Dead, The Beatles, Red Hot Chili Peppers, Dead Kennedys, Bauhaus, Depeche Mode, New Order, Radiohead, Metallica, Miles Davis, Alice in Chains, Iron Maiden, Bad Brains, Slayer, Van Halen, and Kiss. One reviewer claimed that their music encompasses different sounds, from sounding like "Fugazi playing Rush" to sometimes "tread[ing] close to Frank Zappa territory." Malakian has stated that "I'm a fan of music. I'm not necessarily a fan of any one band." Dolmayan stated "I don't think we sound like anybody else. I consider us System of a Down." Odadjian stated "You can compare us to whoever you want. I don't care. Comparisons and labels have no effect on this band. Fact is fact: We are who we are and they are who they are."

== Legacy and influence ==
Sweden's former Prime Minister, Magdalena Andersson has stated that she is a fan of the band. In a 2012 interview with The Village Voice, singer Morrissey stated that "Lonely Day" was the last song he absolutely loved. Rapper RZA, member of Wu-Tang Clan, selected Mezmerize as one of his favorite rock albums.

In 2002, Jack Black performed a cover of "Chop Suey!" on Channel [V] Australia. In an interview with Stereogum, Tankian commented on various covers of "Chop Suey!", stating: "One of my favorite ones is Jack Black's, when he just kind of makes shit up, and he's so great."

In 2016, the staff of Loudwire named them the eleventh-best metal band of all time.

In 2020, British music magazine Kerrang! ranked "Chop Suey!" as the band's greatest song.

In 2021, Kerrang! listed ten bands that, in their view, would not exist without System of a Down: Frank Carter and the Rattlesnakes, Maximum the Hormone, Portrayal of Guilt, Beartooth, Bad Acid Trip, AC×DC, American Standards, Avenged Sevenfold, Tesseract, and Viza.

== Band members ==
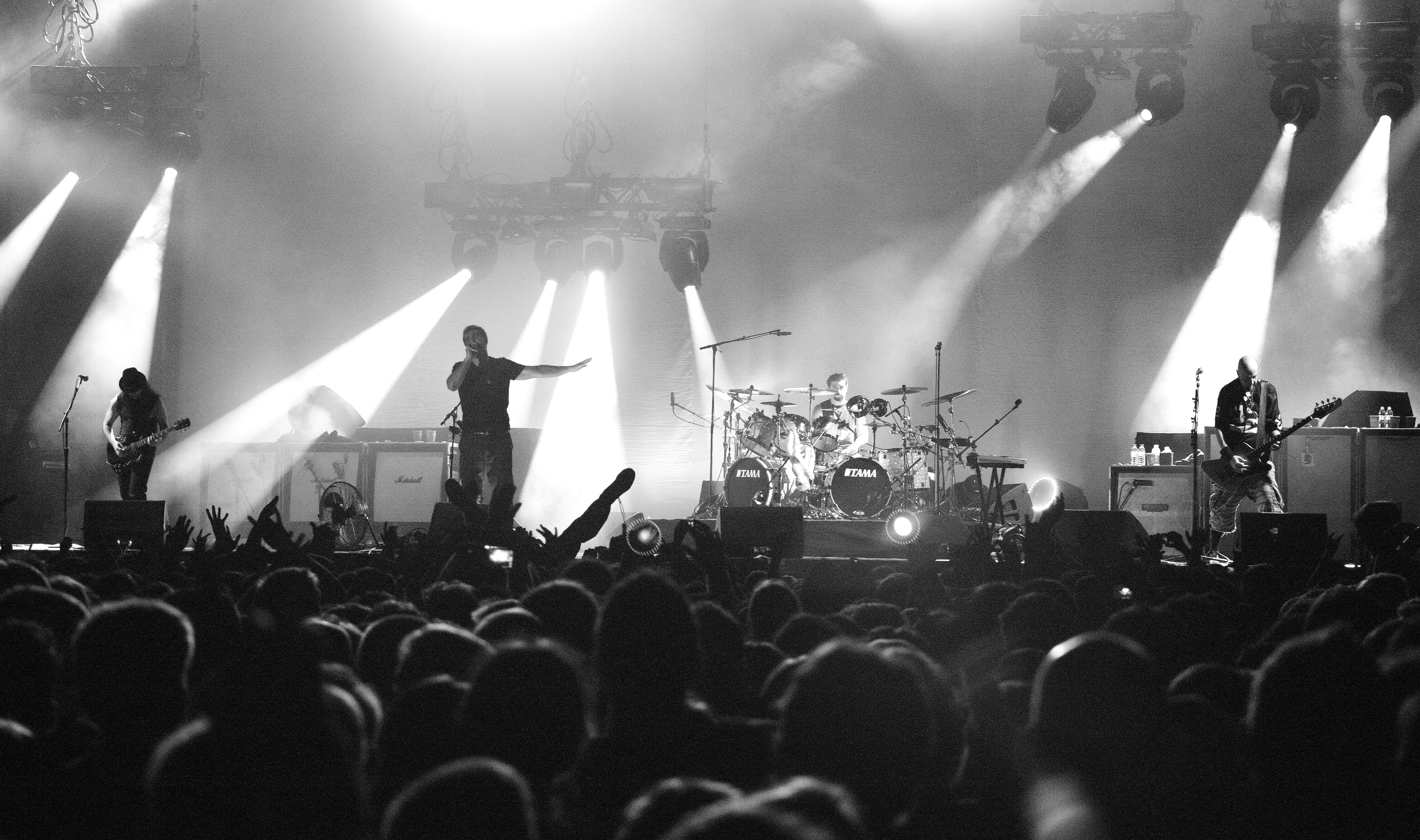
System of a Down in 2013

Current

- Serj Tankian – lead vocals, keyboards, samples (1994–2006, 2010–present), occasional rhythm guitar (2001–2006, 2010–present)
- Daron Malakian – guitar, backing vocals (1994–2006, 2010–present), lead vocals (2004–2006, 2010–present); bass, keyboards (2004–2005)
- Shavo Odadjian – bass, occasional backing vocals (1994–2006, 2010–present)
- John Dolmayan – drums (1997–2006, 2010–present)

Former

- Andy Khachaturian – drums (1994–1997)

Timeline

== Discography ==
- System of a Down (1998)
- Toxicity (2001)
- Steal This Album! (2002)
- Mezmerize (2005)
- Hypnotize (2005)

== Awards and nominations ==
Year	Awards	Category	Work	Result
1999	Kerrang! Awards	Best International Live Act	—N/a	Won
2002	Grammy Awards	Grammy Award for Best Metal Performance	"Chop Suey!"	Nominated
2002	MTV Video Music Awards	Best Rock Video	"Chop Suey!"	Nominated
2002	MTV Video Music Awards	Best Editing	"Chop Suey!"	Nominated
2002	Billboard Music Awards	Modern Rock Artist of the Year	—N/a	Nominated
2002	MTV Video Music Awards Latinoamérica	Best International Rock Artist	—N/a	Nominated
2002	MTV Video Music Awards Latinoamérica	Best International New Artist	—N/a	Nominated
2003	Grammy Awards	Best Hard Rock Performance	"Aerials"	Nominated
2003	MuchMusic Video Awards	Best International Video – Group	"Boom!"	Nominated
2003	California Music Awards	Outstanding Group	—N/a	Won
2003	American Music Awards	Favorite Alternative Artist	—N/a	Nominated
2003	Kerrang! Awards	Best International Band	—N/a	Nominated
2005	Kerrang! Awards	Best Single	"B.Y.O.B"	Nominated
2005	Kerrang! Awards	Best Video	"B.Y.O.B"	Nominated
2005	Kerrang! Awards	Best Album	Mezmerize	Nominated
2005	Kerrang! Awards	Best Live Band	—N/a	Nominated
2005	Kerrang! Awards	Best Band on the Planet	—N/a	Nominated
2005	American Music Awards	Favorite Alternative Artist	—N/a	Nominated
2005	Metal Storm Awards	Best Alternative Metal Album	Mezmerize	Won
2005	MTV Video Music Awards	Best Art Direction	"B.Y.O.B."	Nominated
2005	MTV Europe Music Awards	Best Alternative	—N/a	Won
2006	Grammy Awards	Best Hard Rock Performance	"B.Y.O.B."	Won
2006	MTV Europe Music Awards	Best Alternative	—N/a	Nominated
2006	ECHO Awards	Best International Rock/Alternative Group	Mezmerize	Won
2006	mtvU Woodie Awards	Greatest Social Impact	"Question!"	Won
2007	Grammy Awards	Best Hard Rock Performance	"Lonely Day"	Nominated
2015	Parajanov-Vartanov Institute Awards	Best Film	Wake Up The Souls Tour	Won
