= John Dolmayan =

American drummer (born 1972)

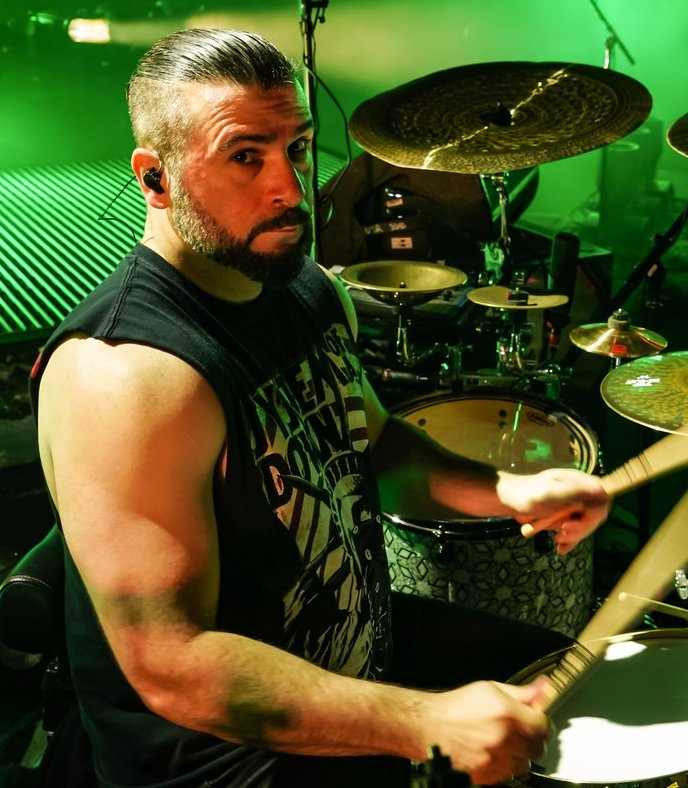
- Dolmayan in 2018

Background information
- Born: Hovig Dolmayan; July 15, 1972 (age 54); Beirut, Lebanon
- Origin: Glendale, California, U.S.
- Genres: Alternative metal; nu metal; alternative rock; experimental rock
- Occupations: Musician
- Instrument: Drums
- Years active: 1994–present
- Member of: System of a Down
- Formerly of: Scars on Broadway
- Website: systemofadown.com

Hovig "John" Dolmayan (Armenian: Հովիկ Դոլմայան; born July 15, 1972) is a Lebanese-American musician, best known as the drummer of System of a Down. He is also the former drummer for Scars on Broadway. Dolmayan was ranked number 33 on Loudwire's list of Top 200 Hard Rock + Metal Drummers of All Time.

== Early life ==
John Dolmayan was born in Beirut, Lebanon, to Armenian parents. His real name is Hovig (John or John the Baptist in Armenian), in honor of his grandfather. During the Lebanese Civil War, his family moved to California.

Dolmayan first became interested in drums at the age of two. His father was a saxophone player and when his mother took him to watch his father play, he mimicked his father's drummer. He learned to play the drums by putting on records and practicing for hours a day, and continued said practice for years. Dolmayan describes his musical style as one influenced by whatever he could get his hands on, including the jazz albums belonging to his father and the rock albums he shared with his friends.

Dolmayan is a fan of the Who and cites their drummer, Keith Moon, as his biggest influence. Other drummers that he cites as major influences include Led Zeppelin's John Bonham, Stewart Copeland from the Police, and Rush's Neil Peart.

== Career ==
=== System of a Down ===
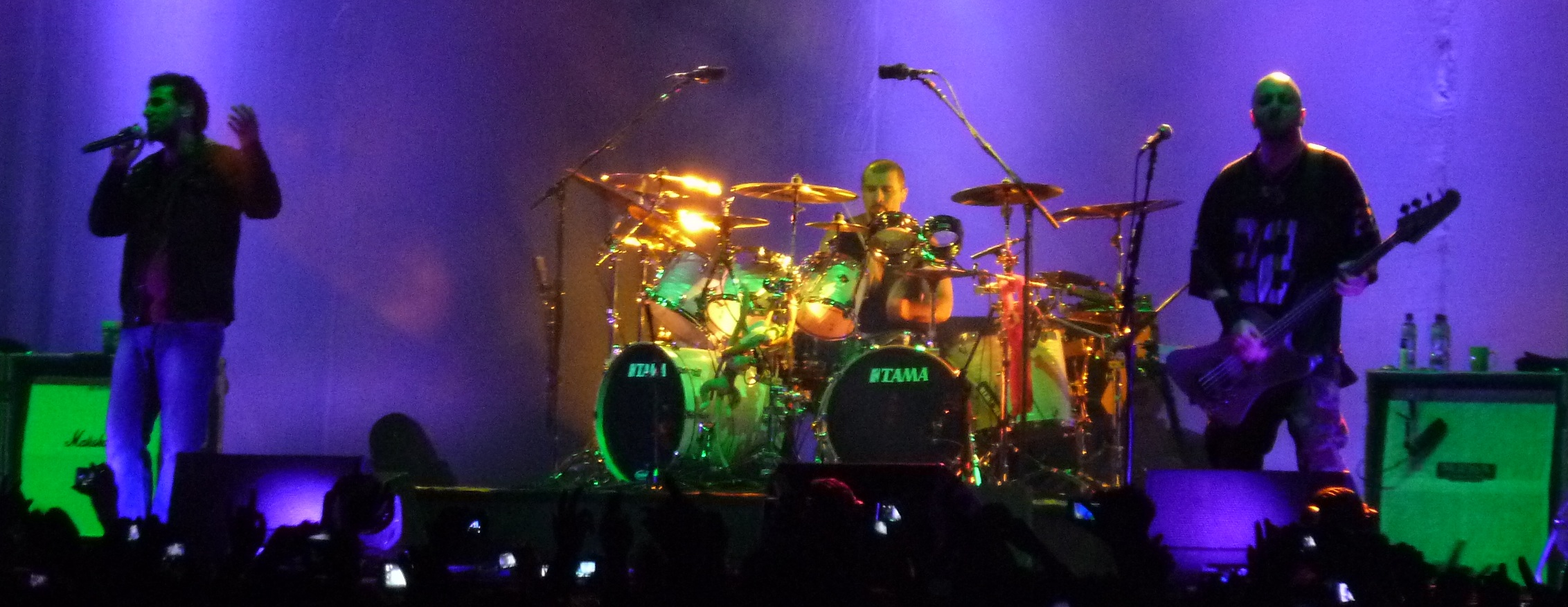
Dolmayan drumming with System of a Down in 2011

Dolmayan joined System of a Down in 1997 after their original drummer, Ontronik "Andy" Khachaturian, left the band due to a hand injury.

Dolmayan recorded five albums with System of a Down: System of a Down (1998), Toxicity (2001), Steal This Album! (2002), Mezmerize (2005) and Hypnotize (2005).

Dolmayan won DRUM! Magazine's 2006 Drummer of the year and was the feature story in their March edition. The band went on hiatus in 2006, but reunited in 2010 to occasionally tour.

=== Scars on Broadway ===
After System of a Down went on hiatus in 2006, Dolmayan teamed up with Daron Malakian (System of a Down's guitarist/vocalist) to form a new band called Scars on Broadway, which recorded their eponymous debut album in 2007 and 2008. The album was released in the summer of 2008 and Dolmayan, Malakian, guitarist Franky Perez, bassist Dominic Cifarelli, and keyboardist Danny Shamoun performed concerts and prepared to embark on a tour in support of the album before Malakian suddenly cancelled the tour in October 2008.

In August 2009, Dolmayan, Perez, Shamoun, and Cifarelli as Scars on Broadway traveled to Iraq for a USO tour across the U.S. army bases. Their setlist consisted of covers as well as a few Scars on Broadway songs.

Scars on Broadway reunited with Malakian on May 2, 2010, and released a new single later that year. However, the project went dormant and Dolmayan was no longer involved when Malakian reformed the group in 2018.

=== Other projects ===
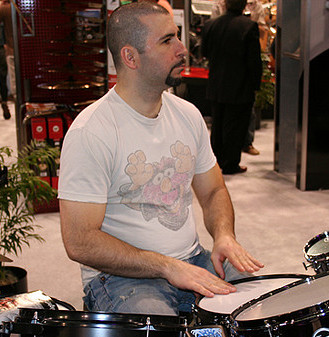
Dolmayan in 2009

Dolmayan recorded drums for Killing Joke's 2003 self-titled album, (although the band ended up going with Dave Grohl's tracks) as well as Scum of the Earth's debut album, Blah...Blah...Blah...Love Songs for the New Millennium. He also played drums on the Axis of Justice concert tour with various artists and on the Serj Tankian solo debut, Elect the Dead.

In June 2009, Dolmayan formed a new rock band called Indicator with three friends from Southern California, members of the recently disbanded punk rock band If All Else Fails: Tom Capossela, Ryan Huber, and Ryan Murphy. The band played their first show at The Bitter End in San Diego on July 22, 2009, with Dolmayan's fellow Scars on Broadway member Franky Perez joining the band for a few songs. Their second and final show took place at a strip club in Las Vegas. The band wrote 10-12 songs from 2009 to 2010; live and acoustic demos exist of them all. The four remain in contact although it is uncertain whether the songs will ever be properly recorded.

Dolmayan performed with System of a Down bandmates Daron Malakian and bassist Shavo Odadjian and Scars on Broadway guitarist Franky Perez for Odadjian's Halloween show. Dolmayan, Malakian, and Odadjian performed together again in November 2009 during a charity show for Deftones bassist Chi Cheng.

Dolmayan has devoted much of his life to the comic book retail industry, including launching Torpedo Comics out of Nevada. Torpedo Comics has two brick and mortar stores in addition to a significant online presence.

In 2009, John auditioned for the Smashing Pumpkins, in the absence of Jimmy Chamberlin.

In 2014, Dolmayan started a Kickstarter to fund cover project, These Grey Men, releasing their first single, a cover of Radiohead's "Street Spirit (Fade Out)", in January 2020. Avenged Sevenfold singer M. Shadows contributed vocals to the track; Tom Morello contributed the guitar solo at the song's close. The second single features System of a Down bandmate Serj Tankian in a cover of David Bowie's "Starman".

== Personal life ==
John Dolmayan is married to Diana Dolmayan (née Madatyan), who is the sister of Tankian's wife Angela, making them brothers-in-law.

On his social media accounts, Dolmayan is very politically active like frontman Serj Tankian. Unlike his System of a Down bandmates, particularly Tankian, Dolmayan holds a conservative viewpoint and has supported Donald Trump's presidency. Tankian has stated that it is "frustrating" to be politically opposite with his bandmate and brother-in-law. In October 2023, Dolmayan claimed he had lost friends as well as "hundreds of thousands of fans" on Instagram due to his controversial opinions about Trump, his beliefs that Black Lives Matter "never had legitimacy" and was a "propaganda tool" for the Democratic Party, and his arguments that the COVID-19 pandemic "has always been about money".

A longtime comic book collector, Dolmayan founded Torpedo Comics, a retailer specializing in rare and collectible comic books. The company operates an online store and a retail location in Irvine, California. Its Las Vegas storefront, which opened in 2017, closed in May 2026 after nine years in operation. In October 2026, Dolmayan purchased an original copy of Action Comics #1, the 1938 comic book featuring the first appearance of Superman, for $825,000 at New York Comic Con.

== Discography ==
System of a Down

- System of a Down (1998)
- Toxicity (2001)
- Steal This Album! (2002)
- Mezmerize (2005)
- Hypnotize (2005)

Serj Tankian

- Elect the Dead (2007)

Scars on Broadway

- Scars on Broadway (2008)

Axis of Justice

- Concert Series Volume 1 (2004)

Scum of the Earth

- Blah...Blah...Blah...Love Songs for the New Millennium (Guest Drums) (2004)

These Grey Men

- These Grey Men (2020)

== Equipment ==
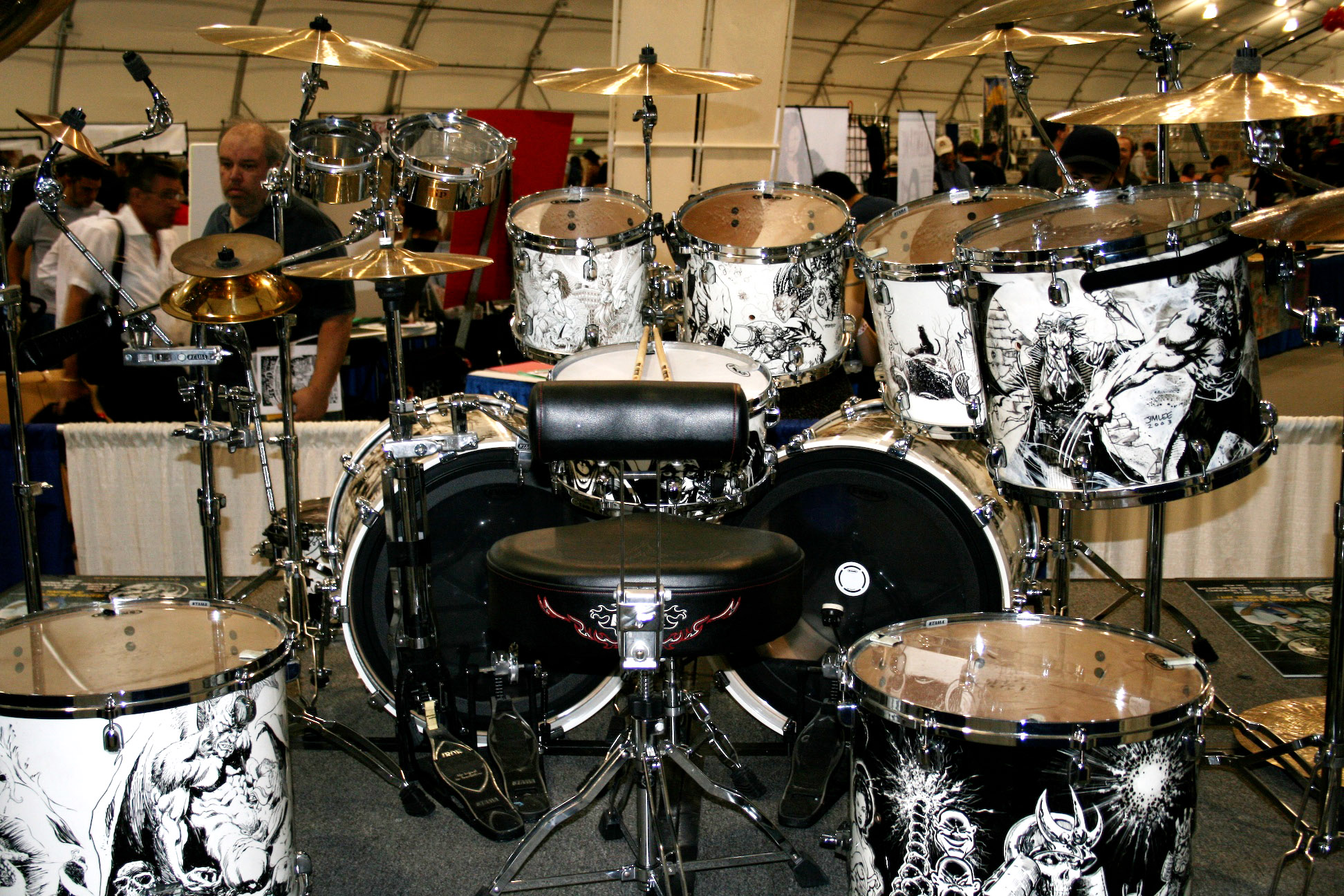
Dolmayan's drumset

Dolmayan uses Tama Drums and hardware, Paiste cymbals, Evans Drumheads, LP percussion and his signature Vic Firth drumsticks.

- Drums – Tama Starclassic Bubinga
  - 10"×8" Rack Tom
  - 12"×9" Rack Tom
  - 13"x10" Rack Tom
  - 16"×14" Floor Tom
  - 18"×16" Floor Tom
  - 22"×18" Bass Drum
  - 14"×6" John Dolmayan Signature Snare
- Cymbals – Paiste
  - Traditionals 22" Medium Light Swish
  - RUDE 14" Hi-Hat
  - 2002 6" Bell Chime
  - Signature 18" Fast Crash
  - Signature 10" Splash
  - Signature 8" Splash
  - RUDE 14" Hi-Hat
  - Signature 19" Full Crash
  - RUDE 24" Mega Power Ride
  - 2002 24" Big Ride
  - 2002 19" Wild China
- Sticks – Vic Firth
  - John Dolmayan Signature 16" length, .580" diameter

In the early 2000s, Dolmayan, an avid comic book collector and vendor since childhood, commissioned a group of notable comics artists to create artwork for the drum kit he used. He had Arthur Adams illustrate a scene of giant women fighting robots and Godzilla; Simon Bisley illustrated the Hulk and Thing; Kevin Eastman provided illustration of the Teenage Mutant Ninja Turtles; and Tim Vigil depicted a sexually explicit scene of demons engaged in a sex act.

== Awards ==
- In 2006, Dolmayan won Drum! Magazine's drummer of the year award. He also won the alternative rock drummer of the year award.
