= August Burns Red discography =

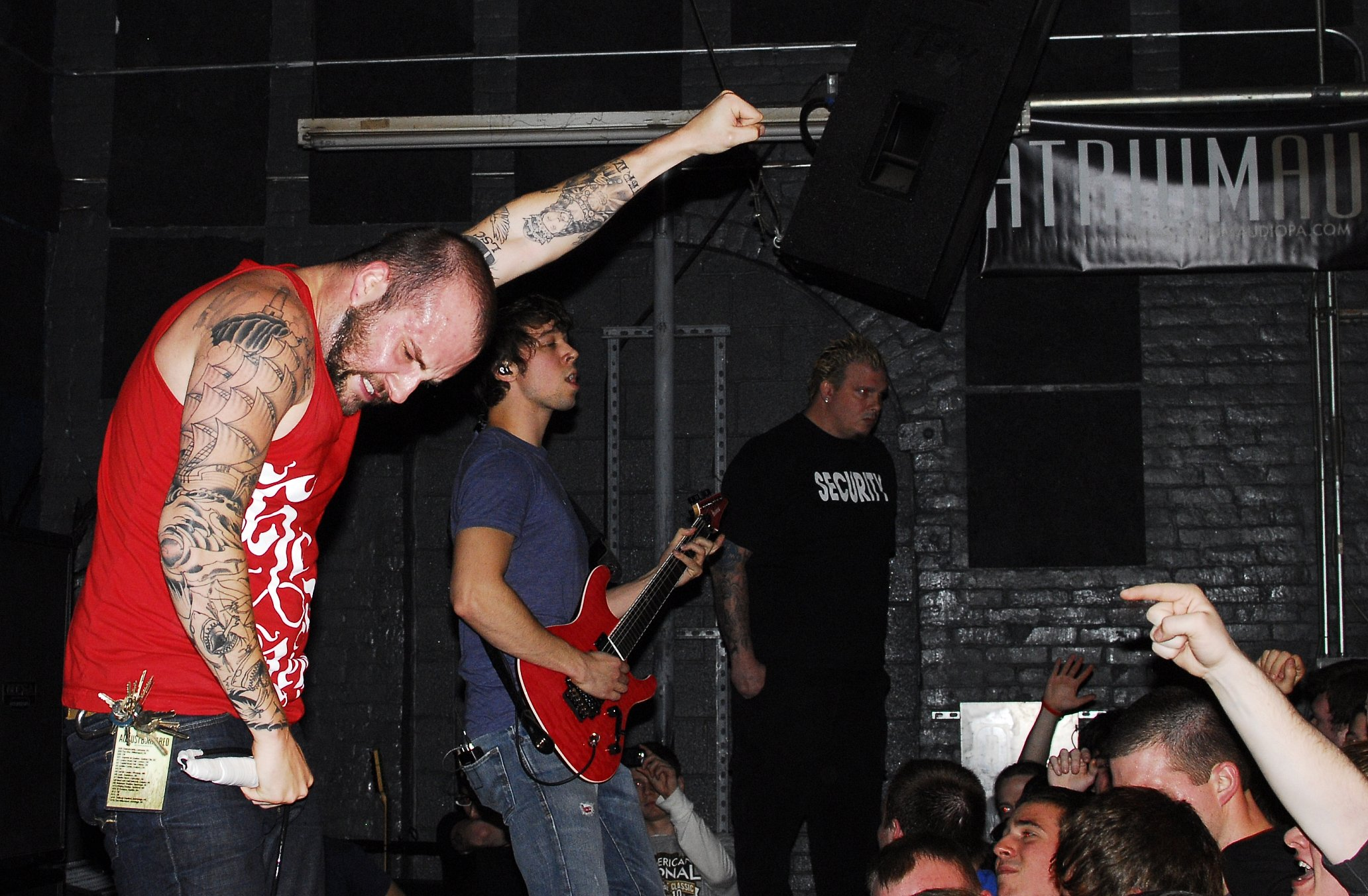
- August Burns Red performing in 2011
- Studio albums: 11
- Extended plays: 7
- Live albums: 3
- Singles: 38
- Video albums: 2
- Music videos: 26
- Remix albums: 4
- Demos: 2
- Other appearances: 10

The following is the complete discography of August Burns Red, a Pennsylvanian metalcore band. Their releases have so far consisted of eleven full-length studio albums, seven EPs, three live albums, two video albums, four remix albums, thirty-eight singles, twenty-six music videos, two demos and ten other appearances.

== Albums ==
=== Studio albums ===
List of studio albums, with selected chart positions
Title	Album details	Peak chart positions										Sales
Title	Album details	US	US Christian	US Hard Rock	US Rock	US Indie	AUS	CAN	UK Down.	UK C&G	UK Rock	Sales
Thrill Seeker	Released: November 8, 2005; Label: Solid State; Formats: CD, LP, DL	—	—	—	—	—	—	—	—	—	—	
Messengers	Released: June 19, 2007; Label: Solid State, CI; Formats: CD, LP, DL	81	1	—	—	—	—	—	—	—	—	
Constellations	Released: July 14, 2009; Label: Solid State; Formats: CD, LP, DL	24	1	2	8	—	—	—	—	—	—	
Leveler	Released: June 21, 2011; Label: Solid State; Formats: CD, LP, DL	11	1	1	2	—	93	15	—	—	23	
Sleddin' Hill	Released: October 9, 2012; Label: Solid State; Formats: CD, LP, DL	147	8	14	—	—	—	—	—	—	—	
Rescue & Restore	Released: June 25, 2013; Label: Solid State; Formats: CD, LP, DL	9	2	2	3	1	93	23	—	—	20	
Found in Far Away Places	Released: June 29, 2015; Label: Fearless; Formats: CD, LP, DL	9	1	1	1	1	43	7	—	—	15	
Phantom Anthem	Released: October 6, 2017; Label: Fearless; Formats: CD, LP, DL	19	1	2	4	—	46	57	75	—	18	US: 20,000
Guardians	Released: April 3, 2020; Label: Fearless; Formats: CD, LP, DL	53	1	2	4	—	54	—	85	4	13	
Death Below	Released: March 24, 2023; Label: SharpTone; Formats: CD, LP, DL	157	—	8	—	24	—	—	69	3	18	
Season of Surrender	Released: June 5, 2026; Label: Fearless; Formats: CD, LP, DL	— (Note: Season of Surrender did not enter the Billboard 200, but peaked at number 32 on the Billboard Top Album Sales.)	5	—	—	—	85	—	87	9	—	

=== Live albums ===
List of live albums, with selected chart positions
Title	Album details	Peak chart positions			
Title	Album details	US	US Christian	US Hard Rock	US Rock
Home	Released: September 28, 2010; Label: Solid State; Formats: CD, DL, DVD	121	10	12	45
Thrill Seeker (Live)	Released: November 14, 2020; Label: ABR Records; Formats: LP, DL	—	—	—	—
Leveler (Live)	Released: May 6, 2022; Label: ABR Records; Formats: DL	—	—	—	—

=== Remix albums ===
List of remix albums
Title	Album details
Messengers Remixed	Released: January 26, 2018; Label: Solid State; Formats: DL
Constellations Remixed	Released: June 14, 2019; Label: Solid State; Format: DL
Leveler: 10th Anniversary Edition	Released: May 21, 2021; Label: ABR Records; Formats: CD, LP, DL
Thrill Seeker: 20th Anniversary Edition	Released: January 24, 2025; Label: ABR Records; Formats: CD, LP, DL

=== Video albums ===
List of video albums
Title	Album details
Messengers DVD	Released: June 19, 2007; Label: Solid State; Format: DVD
Foreign & Familiar	Released: November 26, 2013; Label: Solid State; Formats: DVD

== Extended plays ==
List of extended plays, with selected chart positions
Title	EP details	Peak chart positions
Title	EP details	US Christian
Looks Fragile After All	Released: August 24, 2004; Label: CI; Formats: CD, LP, DL	—
Lost Messengers: The Outtakes	Released: February 24, 2009; Label: Solid State; Formats: CD, LP, DL	17
Four Minutes Being Cool (Split with Silverstein)	Released: April 20, 2013; Label: Hopeless; Formats: LP, DL	—
Winter Wilderness	Released: November 9, 2018; Label: Fearless; Formats: LP, DL	—
Phantom Sessions	Released: February 8, 2019; Label: Fearless; Formats: LP, DL	—
Guardians Sessions	Released: April 16, 2021; Label: Fearless; Formats: LP, DL	—
White Washed & Composure 2022	Released: July 1, 2022; Label: ABR Records; Formats: LP, DL	—

== Singles ==
Year	Song	Album
2009	"Thirty and Seven"	Constellations
2009	"O Come, O Come, Emmanuel"	Non-album single
2010	"Indonesia"	Constellations
2010	"The Little Drummer Boy"	Non-album single
2011	"Empire"	Leveler
2011	"God Rest Ye Merry, Gentlemen"	Non-album single
2012	"Sleigh Ride"	Sleddin' Hill
2013	"You Vandal" (Saves the Day cover)	Four Minutes Being Cool
2013	"Spirit Breaker"	Rescue & Restore
2015	"The Wake"	Found in Far Away Places
2015	"Identity"	Found in Far Away Places
2016	"What Child Is This? (Greensleeves)"	Non-album single
2017	"Invisible Enemy"	Phantom Anthem
2017	"The Frost"	Phantom Anthem
2017	"Last Christmas" (Wham! cover)	Non-album single
2018	"Dangerous"	Phantom Anthem
2019	"The Legend of Zelda"	Phantom Sessions
2020	"Defender"	Guardians
2020	"Bones"	Guardians
2020	"Paramount"	Guardians
2020	"All I Want for Christmas Is You" (Mariah Carey cover)	Non-album single
2020	"Chop Suey!" (System of a Down cover)	Guardians Sessions
2021	"Standing in the Storm"	Guardians Sessions
2021	"Extinct by Instinct (Reprise)"	Guardians Sessions
2021	"Westworld" (Ramin Djawadi cover)	Guardians Sessions
2021	"Icarus"	Guardians Sessions
2021	"Vengeance"	Non-album single
2021	"Poor Millionaire" (featuring Ryan Kirby)	Leveler: 10th Anniversary Edition
2021	"Pangaea" (featuring Misha Mansoor)	Leveler: 10th Anniversary Edition
2021	"Santa Claus Is Coming to Town"	Non-album single
2022	"Ancestry" (featuring Jesse Leach)	Death Below
2023	"Backfire"	Death Below
2023	"Reckoning" (featuring Spencer Chamberlain)	Death Below
2023	"Up on the Housetop"	Non-album singles
2024	"The Cleansing" (new version; featuring Will Ramos)	Non-album singles
2024	"Exhumed"	Non-album singles
2024	"Waltz of the Flowers"	Non-album singles
2025	"Your Little Suburbia Is in Ruins" (re-recorded)	Thrill Seeker: 20th Anniversary Edition
2026	"Behemoth"	Season of Surrender
2026	"The Nameless"	Season of Surrender

=== Other charted songs ===
Year	Song	Album	Chart peaks			
Year	Song	Album	Christian Digital	Rock Digital	Christian Songs	Christian Streaming
2009	"Carol of the Bells"	Lost Messengers: The Outtakes	—	—	—	19
2012	"God Rest Ye Merry Gentlemen" (re-recorded)	Sleddin' Hill	1	35	—	—
2012	"Carol of the Bells" (2012)	Sleddin' Hill	29	—	—	—
2013	"The Nutcracker"	Sleddin' Hill (2013 re-release)	—	—	34	—

== Demos ==
List of demo albums
Title	Demo details
August Burns Red	Released: 2003; Label: Self-released; Formats: CD
Pre-Production	Released: 2005; Label: Self-released; Formats: DL

== Music videos ==
Year	Song	Album	Director(s)
2004	"Background Music to Her Awakening"	Looks Fragile After All EP	August Burns Red
2006	"Your Little Suburbia Is in Ruins"	Thrill Seeker	Dale Restegheni
2007	"Composure"	Messengers	Endeavor Media
2007	"Back Burner"	Messengers	Endeavor Media
2009	"Meddler"	Constellations	Endeavor Media
2010	"White Washed"	Constellations	Brian Shaub
2010	"Marianas Trench"	Constellations	Robby Starbuck
2011	"Internal Cannon"	Leveler	Jimmie Myers
2012	"Empire"	Leveler	Jimmie Myers
2013	"Fault Line"	Rescue & Restore	Daniel Davison
2013	"Beauty in Tragedy"	Rescue & Restore	Giles Smith
2013	"Provision"	Rescue & Restore	Daniel Davison
2015	"Identity"	Found in Far Away Places	Drew Russ
2015	"Ghosts"	Found in Far Away Places	Drew Russ
2017	"Invisible Enemy"	Phantom Anthem	Samuel Halleen
2017	"The Frost"	Phantom Anthem	Dan Fusselman and Samuel Halleen
2018	"King of Sorrow"	Phantom Anthem	Dan Fusselman
2018	"Dangerous"	Phantom Anthem	Samuel Halleen
2019	"The Legend of Zelda"	Phantom Sessions EP	Clint Tustin
2020	"Defender"	Guardians	Dan Fusselman
2020	"Bones"	Guardians	Dan Fusselman
2021	"Standing in the Storm"	Guardians Sessions EP	Stefano Bertelli
2021	"Bloodletter"	Guardians	Samuel Halleen
2022	"Ancestry"	Death Below	David Brodsky
2023	"Backfire"	Death Below	Chris Klumpp
2023	"Reckoning"	Death Below	Wombat Fire
2026	"Behemoth"	Season of Surrender	Mills Miller

== Other appearances ==
- Youngbloods II: A Solid State Sampler (2006)
- This Is Solid State, Volume 6 (2007)
- X Christmas (2008)
- Punk Goes Pop Volume Two (2009)
- Songs from the Penalty Box, Solid State Vol. 7 (2009)
- Atticus... Dragging the Lake IV (2009)
- Happy Christmas, Vol. 5 (2010)
- I Am Solid State Sampler (2010)
- Punk Goes Pop Vol. 6 (2014)
- Punk Goes Christmas: Deluxe Edition (2015)
