= Babylon Babies =

1999 novel by Maurice G. Dantec

- First edition
- Author: Maurice G. Dantec
- Translator: Noura Wedell
- Language: French
- Genre: Science fiction novel
- Publisher: Gallimard
- Publication date: December 1999
- Media type: Print (Paperback)
- Pages: 526 pp
- ISBN: 978-1-58435-023-1
- OCLC: 61129655
- Dewey Decimal: 843/.914 22
- LC Class: PQ2664.A4888 B3314 2005

Babylon Babies is the third novel by French-born Canadian writer Maurice G. Dantec, published in 1999. It follows La Sirène rouge (1993) and Les Racines du mal (1995).

== Plot ==
Set in 2014, the main character, Hugo Cornelius Toorop (hero of The Red Siren), is a mercenary whose mission is to escort a young woman with schizophrenia, Marie Zorn, from Siberia to Quebec on behalf of a sect. It appears that the young woman is the surrogate mother of twins, representing the next stage of human evolution.

== Publication ==
The novel was published by Gallimard on 12 March 1999 in the collection La Noire. A paperback edition was then published on 4 April 2001 in the collection Folio SF.

== Film adaptation ==
Mathieu Kassovitz and Éric Besnard developed an English-language adaptation of Dantec's novel with financing from StudioCanal and Twentieth Century Fox. Vin Diesel was cast to play the lead, alongside Mark Strong, Michelle Yeoh, and Charlotte Rampling.

== See also ==
- The Red Siren
