= Innervision =

Promotional single by System of a Down

from the album Steal This Album!
- Released: October 2002
- Studio: Cello (Hollywood)
- Length: 2:35
- Label: American; Columbia
- Songwriters: Serj Tankian; Daron Malakian
- Producers: Rick Rubin; Daron Malakian

System of a Down singles chronology
"Aerials" (2002)	"Innervision" (2002)	"Boom!" (2003)

"Innervision" is a song by American heavy metal band System of a Down, released as a promotional single from their third studio album, Steal This Album! (2002).

== Overview ==
"Innervision" was the first promotional single released from Steal This Album!.

The song was leaked prior to the album's release, although it was not included in the Toxicity II bootleg, rather being leaked in a separate way. The origin of the leak is unknown. The leaked version features a slightly different arrangement and lyrics, most predominantly in the bridge and second verse where layered vocals are used on the album version.

== Track listing ==
No.	Title	Lyrics	Music	Length
1.	"Innervision"	Serj Tankian	Daron Malakian, Tankian	2:35

== Personnel ==
All credits adapted from the CD single.

System of a Down

- Serj Tankian – vocals
- Daron Malakian – guitars, vocals
- Shavo Odadjian – bass
- John Dolmayan – drums

Production

- Produced by Rick Rubin and Daron Malakian
- Co-Produced by Serj Tankian
- Recorded by David Schiffman
- Mixed by Andy Wallace
- Mastered by Vlado Meller
- CD sleeve by Brandy Flower

== Charts ==
Chart (2002)	Peak position
US Bubbling Under Hot 100 (Billboard)	7
US Alternative Airplay (Billboard)	12
US Mainstream Rock (Billboard)	14
