= Steal This Album! =

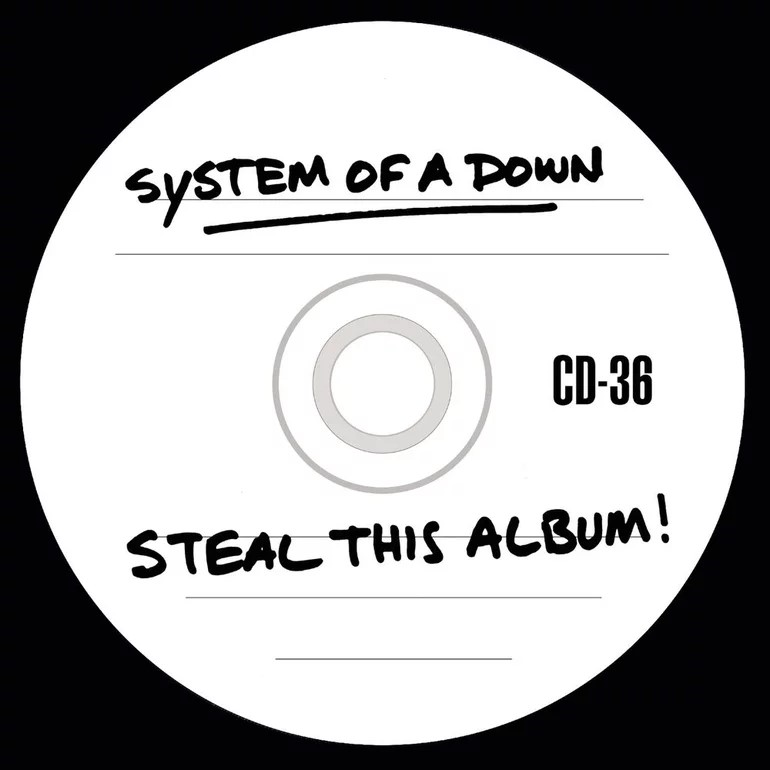
- Digital and vinyl cover versions. CD releases in the US didn't come with inserts and just had the disc.

Studio album by System of a Down
- Released: November 26, 2002
- Recorded: March–July 2001; September–November 2002
- Studio: Cello (Hollywood)
- Genres: Alternative metal; nu metal
- Length: 43:22
- Labels: American; Columbia
- Producers: Rick Rubin; Daron Malakian

System of a Down chronology
Toxicity (2001)	Steal This Album! (2002)	Mezmerize (2005)

Alternative cover
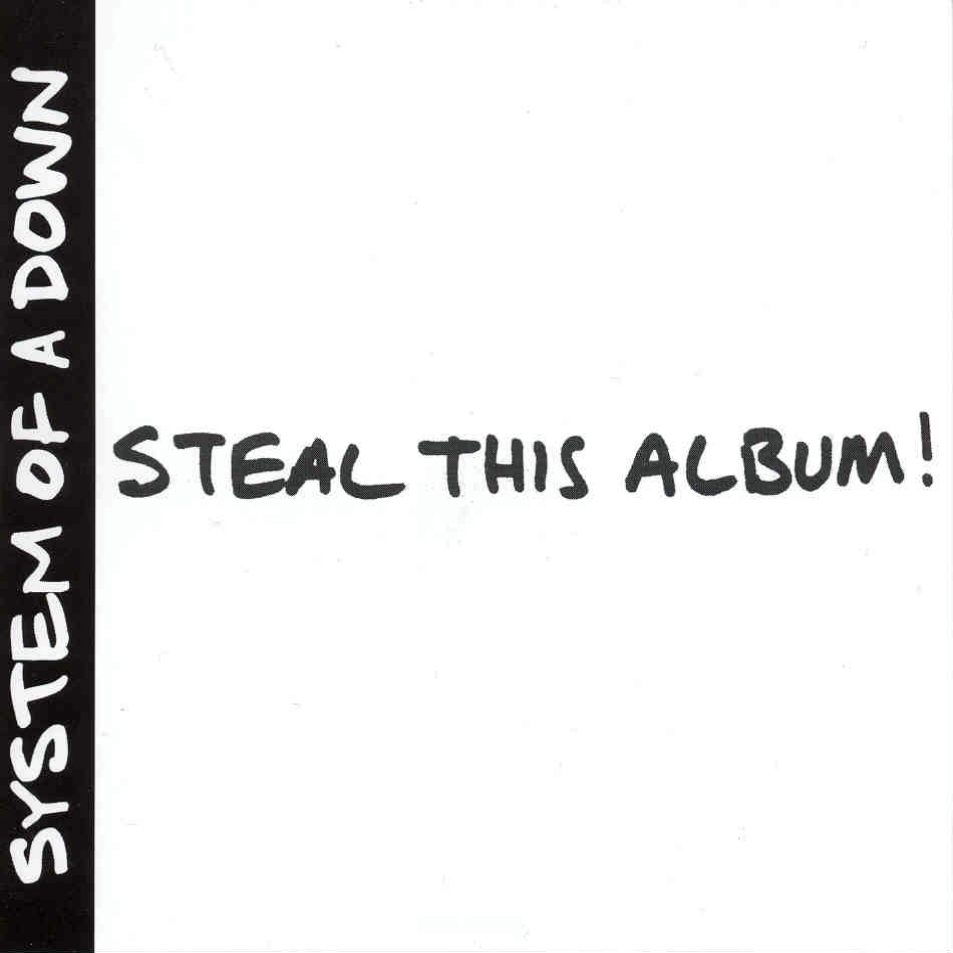
- Alternate European cover

Steal This Album! is the third studio album by the American heavy metal band System of a Down, released on November 26, 2002, by American Recordings and Columbia Records. Produced by Rick Rubin and Daron Malakian, it peaked at number 15 on the US Billboard 200.

== Background ==
In the early half of 2002, a collection of medium-quality MP3s was leaked onto the internet under the name Toxicity II. The band issued a statement expressing disappointment that fans were hearing material that was unfinished, and they worked to release completed, higher-quality versions of the tracks, which became Steal This Album!. The album's title referred to the unauthorized distribution of the recordings, while also alluding to Abbie Hoffman's 1971 book Steal This Book!.

Though often reported in the media as a collection of B-sides and outtakes, the band insisted that the Steal This Album! material is of the same quality as the tracks that made it onto Toxicity; vocalist Serj Tankian has said that the songs were left out of Toxicity "because they didn't fit the overall continuity of the album". In May 2009, drummer John Dolmayan revealed that the album is his favorite System of a Down release. Similarly, Tankian also called the album his favorite System of a Down album in a 2012 AMA on reddit.

A first version of "Streamline" was used in The Scorpion King soundtrack, which was released in early 2002, and as a B-side on the CD2 edition of "Aerials".

Multi-instrumentalist Arto Tunçboyacıyan sings on the song "Bubbles". He had previously collaborated with the band on the album Toxicity.

Commenting on the track "I-E-A-I-A-I-O", drummer John Dolmayan said it was inspired by an encounter he had with actor David Hasselhoff in a liquor store in Los Angeles when he was around 12:

He was getting a drink, not an alcoholic beverage, a soda or something. He was walking out and I couldn't believe it! Here was Knight Rider in front of me! And I said, 'Knight Rider!' I must have been 12. He looked at me and he goes, 'Hey kid,' and he kind of pointed the finger [at me] cowboy style. I told Serj the story, so the lyrics, 'Meeting John at Dale's Jr. / Winked an eye and point a finger.' 'Dale's Jr.' was the liquor store. There's a little insight.

== Critical reception ==
Professional ratings
Aggregate scores
Source	Rating
Metacritic	77/100
Review scores
Source	Rating
AllMusic	4/5 stars
Alternative Press	4.5/5 stars
E! Online	B+
Entertainment Weekly	B+
Kludge	7/10
NME	3.5/5 stars
Playlouder	4.5/5 stars
Slant Magazine	4/5 stars
Spin	4/5 stars
The Rolling Stone Album Guide	3/5 stars

The album received generally favorable reviews from music critics, scoring 77 out of 100 on the aggregate website Metacritic. Giving the album 4 stars out of 5 in his review for AllMusic, Chris True noted, "If System proved anything with 2001's Toxicity, it's that they're one of the few breaths of fresh air out there in mainstream metal land. This collection is no different, and with its amazing pacing, it's hard to not be moved by what this band can do." "Steal This Album! stands head-and-tattooed shoulders above its competition in the hard-rock genre," said Entertainment Weekly in a similarly glowing review, awarding the album a B+ rating.

Rolling Stone called Steal This Album! "an absurdist blast of political rage, silly theater and shattered math metal." Jeremy Gladstone of Kludge gave the album a score of 7 out of 10 in his review and both praised and criticized the album, writing, "Love them or hate them, System is here to stay. The writing is consistent and the music is as tight as we have been accustomed to, perhaps a degree more so at times on the album. Steal This Album! is guaranteed to satisfy every System of a Down fan listening. However, from song eight to twelve on the album, the material is a little too similar to really stand out compared to the more intense tracks. Unreleased material can sometimes be good, and sometimes it still doesn't work out."

Victoria Segal, writing for NME, gave Steal This Album! 3.5 stars out of 5 in a less flattering review, stating, "System of a Down's concerns may be no laughing matter, but unfortunately, their music often is. Guitarist Daron Malakian describes this record as 'a bridge between Toxicity and our next record,' which only indicates troubled waters ahead." She did, however, end her review with, "Yes, System of a Down are insane, ridiculous, a brain-pan pizza with extra mushrooms. But how can something this righteous ever be wrong?"

== Track listing ==
All lyrics written by Serj Tankian, except where noted. All music written by Daron Malakian, except where noted.

No.	Title	Lyrics	Music	Length
1.	"Chic 'n' Stu"	Tankian, Malakian		2:23
2.	"Innervision"			2:33
3.	"Bubbles"	Tankian, Camille Pfister		1:56
4.	"Boom!"	Tankian, Malakian		2:14
5.	"Nüguns"		Malakian, Tankian	2:30
6.	"A.D.D. (American Dream Denial)"	Malakian, Tankian		3:17
7.	"Mr. Jack"	Tankian, Malakian	Malakian, Tankian	4:09
8.	"I-E-A-I-A-I-O"	Tankian, John Dolmayan	Shavo Odadjian, Malakian	3:08
9.	"36"			0:46
10.	"Pictures"			2:06
11.	"Highway Song"			3:13
12.	"Fuck the System"	Tankian, Malakian		2:12
13.	"Ego Brain"		Tankian, Malakian	3:21
14.	"Thetawaves"		Tankian, Malakian	2:36
15.	"Roulette"	Malakian, Tankian		3:21
16.	"Streamline"		Tankian, Malakian	3:37
Total length:				43:22

== Personnel ==
All credits for Steal This Album are adapted from the album's liner notes.

System of a Down

- Daron Malakian – guitars, vocals; production
- Serj Tankian – vocals, keyboards; guitar on "Mr. Jack"
- Shavo Odadjian – bass
- John Dolmayan – drums (except "Roulette")

Additional musicians

- Arto Tunçboyaciyan – vocals and percussions on "Bubbles"
- Greg Collins – theremin on "Ego Brain"
- Camille Pfister – lyrical input on "Bubbles"

Technical personnel

- Rick Rubin – production; mixing ("Roulette")
- David Schiffman – recording; mixing ("Roulette")
- Thom Russo – recording; mixing ("Roulette")
- Andy Wallace – mixing (except "Roulette")
- Vlado Meller – mastering
- Dino Paredes – art direction
- Lindsay Chase – album production coordination

== Charts ==
=== Weekly charts ===
Weekly chart performance for Steal This Album!
Chart (2002–2003)	Peak position
Australian Albums (ARIA)	11
Austrian Albums (Ö3 Austria)	24
Belgian Albums (Ultratop Wallonia)	38
Canadian Albums (Billboard)	13
Dutch Albums (Album Top 100)	41
Finnish Albums (Suomen virallinen lista)	25
French Albums (SNEP)	34
German Albums (Offizielle Top 100)	14
Irish Albums (IRMA)	47
Italian Albums (FIMI)	45
Italian Albums (Musica e Dischi)	50
New Zealand Albums (RMNZ)	26
Norwegian Albums (VG-lista)	36
Scottish Albums (Official Charts)	49
Swedish Albums (Sverigetopplistan)	41
Swiss Albums (Schweizer Hitparade)	25
UK Albums (Official Charts)	56
US Billboard 200	15

=== Year-end charts ===
2002 year-end chart performance for Steal This Album!
Chart (2002)	Position
Canadian Albums (Nielsen SoundScan)	143
Canadian Alternative Albums (Nielsen SoundScan)	46
Canadian Metal Albums (Nielsen SoundScan)	23

2003 year-end chart performance for Steal This Album!
Chart (2003)	Position
US Billboard 200	74

=== Singles ===
Year	Single	Chart	Position
2002	"Innervision"	Mainstream Rock Tracks	14
2002	"Innervision"	Modern Rock Tracks	12

== Certifications ==
Certifications for Steal This Album!
Region	Certification	Certified units/sales
Australia (ARIA)	Gold	35,000^{^}
Finland (Musiikkituottajat)	Gold	15,886
Germany (BVMI)	Gold	150,000^{‡}
Italy (FIMI) sales since 2009	Gold	25,000^{‡}
New Zealand (RMNZ)	Gold	7,500^{^}
United Kingdom (BPI)	Gold	100,000^{^}
United States (RIAA)	Platinum	1,000,000^{^}
^{^} Shipments figures based on certification alone.^{‡} Sales+streaming figures based on certification alone.
