= Babylon A.D. =

2008 film by Mathieu Kassovitz

- Theatrical release poster
- Directed by: Mathieu Kassovitz
- Screenplay by: Mathieu Kassovitz; Éric Besnard; Joseph Simas
- Based on: Babylon Babies by Maurice G. Dantec
- Produced by: Ilan Goldman
- Starring: Vin Diesel; Michelle Yeoh; Mélanie Thierry; Lambert Wilson; Mark Strong
- Cinematography: Thierry Arbogast
- Edited by: Benjamin Weill
- Music by: Atli Örvarsson
- Production companies: StudioCanal; MNP Entreprise; M6 Films; One Race Films; Dune Entertainment
- Distributed by: StudioCanal; (France); 20th Century Fox; (International)
- Release date: 29 August 2008
- Running time: 101 minutes; (France); 90 minutes; (UK & US)
- Countries: France; United Kingdom; United States
- Language: English
- Budget: $60–70 million
- Box office: $72.1 million

Babylon A.D. is a 2008 science-fiction action film directed by Mathieu Kassovitz and written by Kassovitz and Éric Besnard, based on Maurice G. Dantec's 1999 novel Babylon Babies. It stars Vin Diesel as a mercenary tasked with smuggling a superintelligent young woman named Aurora to America. The cast also includes Michelle Yeoh, Mélanie Thierry, Lambert Wilson and Mark Strong. It was an international co-production between French, British, and American companies.

The film was released in France on August 29, 2008, by StudioCanal. It received negative reviews from critics, and failed to meet commercial expectations, grossing $72 million against a $60–70 million budget. Kassovitz disowned the finished film, claiming that 20th Century Fox had interfered throughout production and that the film did not represent his intended vision.

== Plot ==
In a dystopian near future, a Russian mobster, Gorsky, hires the mercenary Toorop to bring a young woman known only as Aurora from Asia to New York City. Gorsky gives Toorop a variety of weapons and a subdermally implanted UN passport. Toorop, the girl, and, her guardian, Sister Rebeka, travel from the Noelite Convent in Kyrgyzstan to reach New York via Russia.

Unlike in the technologically advanced United States, war and terrorist activity have transformed Russia's cities into dangerous, overpopulated slums. The stress of humanity's situation causes Aurora to act out in strange ways and display clairvoyant abilities. On one such occasion, Aurora, seemingly for no reason, panics and runs from a crowded train station just before it explodes in a terrorist attack.

The protagonists must also evade an unknown group of mercenaries claiming to have been sent by Aurora's supposedly dead father. Later, they board a submarine that carries refugees to Canada. To avoid satellite detection, the Captain of the submarine orders his crew to dive and he shoots some of the refugees still trying to get on board. Aurora, infuriated by the loss of life, operates the 30-year-old submarine without training. Sister Rebeka tells Toorop that Aurora could speak nineteen different languages by the age of two, and always seems to know things she has never learned. Three months before leaving with Toorop, she began acting differently. This occurred after a Noelite doctor administered a pill. The doctor told her to go to New York City and arranged for Toorop to escort them.

After arriving in Alaska with help from Toorop's associate, Finn, the protagonists are attacked by weaponized drones. Toorop manages to destroy all the drones, but also gets wounded. The perils cause Finn to betray the group and so Toorop shoots him dead.

Once in Harlem, a news broadcast about the bombing of the Kyrgyzstan convent causes the group to realize there is more going on than they know. Gorsky, working for the Noelites, had planted a tracking device in Toorop's passport and bombed the convent when he knew they were in the United States. The doctor who earlier saw Aurora examines her again in a hotel room. When he leaves, Aurora reveals (without being told) that she is pregnant with twins despite being a virgin.

Looking outside the hotel, Toorop sees Gorsky's men and the Noelite group heavily armed and waiting for them on the street. The High Priestess calls Toorop and asks him to bring Aurora outside. Just before they take her away, Toorop changes his mind and starts a firefight with the two groups to get the two women to safety. Gorsky's men fire guided missiles at Toorop that track his subdermal passport. Rebeka gets killed defending Aurora, who in turn shoots Toorop and says, "I need you to live". Toorop's clinical death causes the guided missile to go off target (missing Toorop) and explode near Aurora instead; she inexplicably survives.

Dr. Arthur Darquandier revives Toorop using advanced medical techniques, but several of Toorop's body parts are replaced with cybernetics to undo the damage of being dead for over two hours. Darquandier explains that when Aurora was a fetus, he implanted a supercomputer into her brain. It is also implied that the Noelite group had him create Aurora to become pregnant at a certain time to use her as a "virgin birth". After she was born, the Noelites hired Gorsky to kill Darquandier, but Gorsky failed. Darquandier remained "dead" until he found his daughter in Russia with Toorop.

Meanwhile, the Noelites have become a major new salvationist religion, which vast numbers of people cling to as the world spirals out of control. However, the High Priestess desires only power, money and uses invented miracles to court converts. In a private meeting in 2 World Trade Center, the Priestess is shown lambasting her corporate executives for their failure to capture Aurora, alleging 20 years of careful planning had "gone down the tubes."

Darquandier uses a machine to scan Toorop's memory to find out what Aurora said to him before and shortly after shooting him. In Toorop's memory, Aurora tells Toorop to "go home". Toorop and several of Darquandier's men leave the facility. En route to Darquandier's lab, Gorsky calls the High Priestess and demands payment; during the subsequent videocall the High Priestess kills Gorsky by nuclear missile. The High Priestess confronts and kills Darquandier, but Toorop has already escaped.

Toorop goes to his old house in the forest, finds Aurora, and takes her to a hospital. There, six months later, she dies after giving birth. Aurora was "designed to breed", not to live, and so her death after childbirth was preprogrammed. Toorop takes care of her two children, who are shown to be one that looks like Aurora and the other like Toorop.

=== Alternate ending ===
The "StudioCanal" cut of the film does not include the climactic chase scene between the Noelite soldiers and Toorop or the final scene of Toorop with Aurora's children.

== Cast ==
- Vin Diesel as Hugo Toorop, a mercenary and a former Marine. He is a professional smuggler originally from Upstate New York, who has been deported to Eastern Europe, where he does mercenary jobs as a smuggler. He is an expert in advanced weaponry, hand-to-hand combat, tactics, and culinary.
- Michelle Yeoh as Sister Rebeka, a nun from an ascetic branch of the Noelites. She is originally from San Francisco. When she was 17 years old, she joined the Noelites to escape an abusive relationship. She ended up in their Mongolian convent, where she became Aurora's guardian.
- Mélanie Thierry as Aurora, a young woman who has been given shelter by the Noelite nuns. Since when she was a child, she showed supernatural knowledge in all kind of fields and by the age of two could speak 19 languages. She can also sense danger.
- Gérard Depardieu as Gorsky, a wealthy Russian mobster who hires Toorop to transport Aurora to the United States on behalf of the Noelite Church. He owns a private army and lives inside an APC fitted like a limo that is constantly surrounded by a convoy of his soldiers.
- Charlotte Rampling as the High Priestess of the Noelite Church. She does not really care about the religion and seeks only power and wealth. She plans to use science to produce miracles to extend the popularity and the reach of her church.
- Mark Strong as Finn, a Russian smuggler who is an old associate of Toorop. He is ready to help transport Aurora across borders, yet Toorop does not entirely trust him.
- Lambert Wilson as Dr. Arthur Darquandier, Aurora's disabled father, who was presumed to be dead.
- David Belle as Hacker Kid, the leader of Darquandier's henchmen who follow Toorop and Aurora to America.
- Jérôme Le Banner as Killa, an underground fighter.

== Production ==
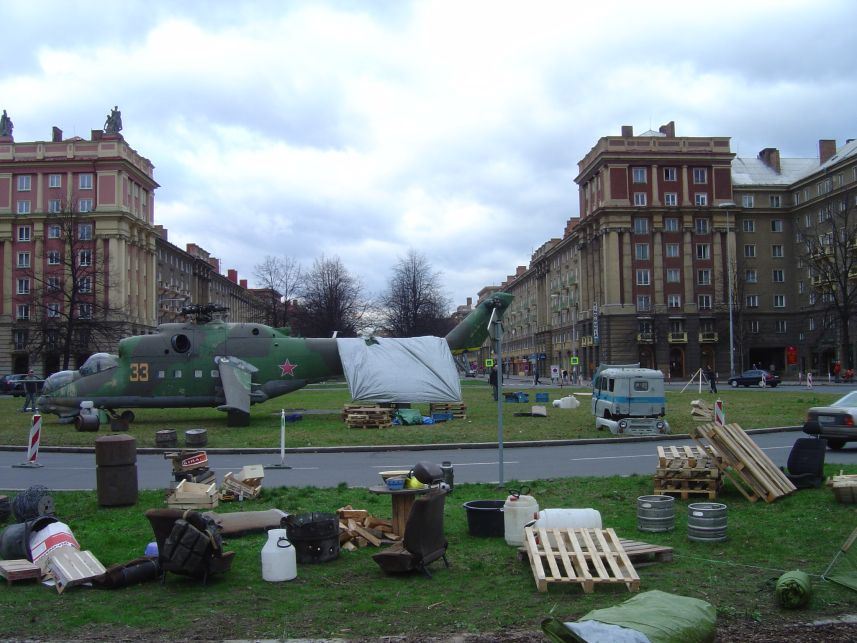
Preparing for the filming in Ostrava-Poruba, Czech Republic

=== Development ===
Mathieu Kassovitz worked on an English-language film adaptation of Maurice Georges Dantec's French novel Babylon Babies for five years; in June 2005, this project got financing from StudioCanal and Twentieth Century Fox. The adapted screenplay was written by Kassovitz and screenwriter Éric Besnard. Production was initially slated to begin in February 2006 in Canada and Eastern Europe.

=== Casting ===
French actor Vincent Cassel was initially sought to be cast in the lead role. In February 2006, actor Vin Diesel entered negotiations to star in the film, titled Babylon A.D., dropping out of the lead role of Hitman in the process.

=== Filming ===
The shooting schedule was slated to begin in June 2006. By February 2007, filming was slated to wrap in April to release Babylon A.D. in time for the coming Thanksgiving. In February, filming took place at Barrandov Studios. In March 2007, the filming crew, having shot in the Czech Republic, took a two-week hiatus to deal with uncooperative weather, such as the lack of snow, and problems with set construction. Crew members scouted Iceland for locations with snow to shoot six to eight days of footage, which was supposed to be done in February. Filming was also done with the leads Diesel, Michelle Yeoh, and Mélanie Thierry in Ostrava in March. The French visual effects company BUF Compagnie was contracted to develop the film's effects under the supervision of Stephane Ceretti.

In April 2007, actor Lambert Wilson was cast into the film. Filming was completed in May 2007.

American artist Khem Caigan designed the sigil that appears as a tattoo on the right side of Toorop's neck – an emblem which originally appeared in the Schlangekraft Necronomicon in 1977.

=== Music ===
The music of Babylon A.D. was written by Icelandic composer Atli Örvarsson. The music supervisor of the movie was Jérôme Hadey. The musical alliance Achozen, represented by Shavo Odadjian and RZA performed the score for the film. Music producer Hans Zimmer described the intended style: "Musically, our objective was to merge the sounds and energies of hip hop with classical music, seamlessly melting them into an unusual soundscape."

=== Re-editing ===
Two different cuts of the film were prepared for release. The version by StudioCanal, released in France and Germany, runs 101 minutes. The version by 20th Century Fox, released in the United States and the United Kingdom, runs 90 minutes. The longer version was later released on English-language home video as a "Raw and Uncut" version.

== Release ==
Babylon A.D. was originally stated to be released in the United States on 29 February 2008, but its release was postponed to 29 August 2008. As of 31 January 2009, the film had grossed $72,105,690 worldwide. In the US the film was placed #2 behind Tropic Thunder with $9,484,627 in 3,390 cinemas with a $2,798 average.

== Reception ==
On Rotten Tomatoes, the film has a 7% approval rating based on 102 reviews and an average rating of 3.20/10, with the consensus calling it "a poorly constructed, derivative sci-fi stinker with a weak script and poor action sequences." On Metacritic it has a score of 26% based on 15 reviews, indicating "generally unfavorable" reviews. Audiences surveyed by CinemaScore gave the film a grade D+ on scale of A to F.

Jordan Mintzer of Variety called it "A noisier, costlier version of Children of Men, yet lacking that film's social-political significance and jaw-dropping direction."

=== Kassovitz's response ===
Mathieu Kassovitz disowned the final film, likening it to a "bad episode of 24". He stated that 20th Century Fox interfered throughout production and that he never had a chance to shoot a scene the way that it was scripted or the way that he wanted it to be.

A French-language documentary of the troubled creation of the film, Fucking Kassovitz, was released in 2011.

== Home media ==
Babylon A.D. was released on Blu-ray and DVD in Europe (Region 2) on 29 December 2008, and in the United States (Region 1) on 6 January 2009. At the same time, the French 101-minute version was released on Blu-ray in the US as Babylon A.D. – Raw and Uncut.
