= Exit (2000 film) =

- Directed by: Olivier Megaton
- Written by: Olivier Megaton
- Produced by: Emmanuel Prévost
- Starring: Patrick Fontana; Féodor Atkine; Serge Blumental; Clotilde Courau; Manuel Blanc; Jean-Michel Fête
- Cinematography: Michel Taburiaux
- Edited by: Olivier Mauffroy
- Music by: Nicolas Bikialo
- Production companies: Avalanche Productions; TPS Cinéma; EuropaCorp
- Distributed by: ARP Sélection
- Release date: 12 July 2000
- Running time: 110 minutes
- Country: France
- Language: French

Exit is a 2000 French thriller film written and directed by Olivier Megaton. The film stars Patrick Fontana, Féodor Atkine, Serge Blumental, Clotilde Courau, Manuel Blanc and Jean-Michel Fête. The film was released on 12 July 2000 by ARP Sélection.

== Plot ==
Stanislas Dobschnik's father dies when Stanislas is seven years old. His distraught mother is later put into psychiatric care and Stanislas is left with a foster family but maintains an obsession with his ailing mother, sitting outside her window for extended periods of time. Stanislas has regular visits with a psychologist, Professor Olbek, who believes that Stanislas has been wrongfully convicted out of prejudice due to his profile. He has the investigation opened again and the conviction overturned. When Stanislas is released, Olbek recommends a job on the night shift at a morgue. Stanislas is pleased with the position because he does not like to be around people. It also allows him time to focus on his work as a serial killer. He photographs his victims and meticulously collects evidence such as hair and murder weapons in plastic bags.

== Cast ==
- Patrick Fontana as Le narrateur / Stan
- Féodor Atkine as Olbek, le psychiatre
- Serge Blumental as Léon / Le commissaire
- Clotilde Courau as Pearl / La journaliste
- Manuel Blanc as Junk
- Jean-Michel Fête as Eric
- Élodie Mennegand as Elodie
