= Guardians Sessions =

EP by August Burns Red
- Released: April 16, 2021
- Studio: Think Loud Studios, York, Pennsylvania; Seventh Wave Studio, Palmyra, Pennsylvania
- Genre: Metalcore
- Length: 27:36
- Label: Fearless
- Producer: Carson Slovak; Grant McFarland

August Burns Red chronology
Guardians (2020)	Guardians Sessions (2021)	Death Below (2023)

Singles from Guardians Sessions
- 1. "Chop Suey!" Released: December 15, 2020; 2. "Standing in the Storm" Released: January 19, 2021; 3. "Extinct by Instinct (Reprise)" Released: February 9, 2021; 4. "Westworld" Released: March 9, 2021; 5. "Icarus" Released: March 23, 2021

Guardians Sessions is the sixth EP by American metalcore band August Burns Red. It was released on April 16, 2021 through Fearless Records. The EP consists of b-sides from the recording sessions of the band's previous album, Guardians, along with two re-imagined versions of songs from the album and two covers.

== Background and promotion ==
Starting in late 2020, August Burns Red began to release a series of singles that were recorded during sessions for their previous studio album, Guardians.

The first single released was a cover of the System of a Down song "Chop Suey!" on December 15, 2020. On January 19, 2021, the band released the single "Standing in the Storm" along with the song's animated music video. The following month, August Burns Red released an instrumental re-recording of the Guardians song "Extinct by Instinct", titled "Extinct by Instinct (Reprise)", on February 9. On March 9, the band released a cover of the theme song for the TV series Westworld, which the band started writing in 2018. A couple of weeks later, the single "Icarus" was released along with the announcement of a new EP, Guardians Sessions; "Icarus" features clean vocals provided by bassist Dustin Davidson.

Professional ratings
Review scores
Source	Rating
Distorted Sound	7/10
Kerrang!	4/5

== Track listing ==
All tracks are written by August Burns Red, except where noted.

No.	Title	Writer(s)	Length
1.	"Standing in the Storm"		4:32
2.	"Icarus"		3:44
3.	"Chop Suey!" (System of a Down cover)	Serj Tankian, Daron Malakian	3:38
4.	"Westworld" (Ramin Djawadi cover)	Djawadi	5:28
5.	"Paramount (Reprise)"		5:10
6.	"Extinct by Instinct (Reprise)"		5:02
Total length:			27:36

== Personnel ==
August Burns Red

- Jake Luhrs – lead vocals
- JB Brubaker – lead guitar
- Brent Rambler – rhythm guitar
- Dustin Davidson – bass, backing vocals, additional guitars, clean vocals on track 2
- Matt Greiner – drums, piano

Additional personnel

- Carson Slovak – production, recording, mixing
- Grant McFarland – production, recording, mixing
- Troy Glessner – mastering
- Florian Mihr – design
- Levi Seitz – lacquer cut
