= Maurice G. Dantec =

French-Canadian science fiction writer

Maurice Georges Dantec
- Born: 14 June 1959; Grenoble, France
- Died: 25 June 2016 (aged 57)
- Occupation: Writer
- Literary movement: Christian-futurism

Maurice Georges Dantec (French: [dɑ̃tɛk]; 14 June 1959 – 25 June 2016) was a French-born Canadian science fiction writer and musician.

== Biography ==
Dantec was born in Grenoble, France, the son of a journalist and a seamstress. He grew up primarily in Ivry-sur-Seine near Paris. While still in high school he met Jean-Bernard Pouy, future author of noir novels such as Le Poulpe, who inspired Dantec to take an interest in noir fiction. In the late 1970s, after graduating from college, Dantec put together a band called "État d'urgence" ("State of Emergency") one of the first French punk acts. In 1977 the band changed its name to "Artefact", but kept the punk ideology. Artefact is a concept-band, influenced by Suicide, Devo, Kraftwerk, Talking Heads and Public Image Limited. Dantec invented the concept of "Hard-Muzak" to define the sound of his band, as a mix of Industrial music and disco making the band the French equivalent of No-Wave bands from New York, and English ones from the post-punk. He pursued a career in Artefact (until the band's breakup in 1981) while working as a copywriter in the advertising industry.

=== Cyberpunk ===
Dantec began writing seriously in the 1990s. His first novel, La Sirène rouge ("The Red Siren"), was published in 1993 as a part of the Série noire collection. The novel won the 813 award for best crime novel. His second novel, Les Racines du mal ("The Roots of Evil"), appeared in 1995 and borders on cyberpunk fiction. The novel was successful commercially and was awarded the Prix de l'Imaginaire. His classically cyberpunk novella Là où tombent les anges ("Where the Angels fall"), appeared the same year, in an extra edition of Le Monde. He worked with Richard Pinhas and Norman Spinrad for the group Heldon, under the project "Schizotrope" for 3 albums, including a North American Tour in 1999.

Dantec and his family relocated to Québec in 1998, where he wrote his third novel Babylon Babies, which further explores the themes of decadence and apocalypse initially developed in Là où tombent les anges. Babylon Babies is influenced partly by Dantec's interests in twentieth century French philosopher Gilles Deleuze, and shamanism.

=== Controversial writings ===
Le Théâtre des opérations, journal métaphysique et polémique ("The Theatre of Operations, a Metaphysical and Polemical Journal") appeared in 2000, and is a polemical diary. Dantec followed this up in 2001 with Laboratoire de catastrophe générale ("Laboratory of General Catastrophes"). In both of these Dantec was influenced by French novelist and poet Léon Bloy's diary, and especially by Bloy's 1905 Belluaires et porchers ("Gladiators and swineherds"). In his works, Dantec attempts to inventory the nihilisms of the 20th century. Inspired by Léon Bloy, he draws a cruel portrait of the vanities in the French literary milieu. The diary also mixes Dantec's poetry, criticisms on rock music, essays on literature, technology, genetics, philosophy and politics. These diaries also explore the author's rising interest in Christianity.

=== Christian-Futurism ===
Villa Vortex - Liber Mundi, I in 2003 opens a trilogy of novels - though its third volume would never be written before Dantec's death - interconnecting metaphysical research (Esotericism), technology and the post-human, in a new formal approach. With this book Dantec is possibly the first French writer to acknowledge the new era opened by the events surrounding 9/11 in a narrative.

The third volume of his journal, following Laboratoire de catastrophe générale, was published by Éditions Albin Michel in 2007.

Dantec wrote for the conservative French-language Canadian magazine Égards.

The novel Cosmos Inc, was published in August 2005 by his new publishing house Albin Michel, the first volume of another trilogy Dantec would never finish before he died.

=== Film adaptations ===
The first film adaptation based on the works of Dantec, The Red Siren directed by Olivier Megaton, was released in August 2002.

A film adaptation of Babylon Babies, the most cyberpunk of Dantec's novels, has been produced under the direction of Mathieu Kassovitz as Babylon A.D., featuring Vin Diesel in the role of Toorop.

=== Dantec in English ===
His novel Babylon Babies was to be translated into English by Semio-text(e) in September 2005.

In May 2006 at the Franco/Irish Literary Festival he made a bilingual conference "ICH BIN EIN DUBLINER", under the theme "Modern technology, its impact on the way we Live Together" discussing metaphysical and political positions

In August 2006 Grande Jonction, the second part of his "Christian-Futurism (Christian eschatology)" trilogy was published by Albin Michel.

Del Rey Books released an English version of Cosmos Incorporated translated by Tina Kover in 2008 and an English version of Grande Jonction (Grand Junction) by the same translator in 2009.

== Work ==
=== Novels ===
- La Sirène rouge.
- Les Racines du mal.
- Babylon Babies.
- Villa Vortex.
- Cosmos Incorporated
- Grande jonction
- Artefact: Machines à écrire 1.0.
- Comme le fantôme d'un jazzman dans la station Mir en déroute
- Métacortex
- Satellite Sisters
- Les Résidents

=== Collections ===
- Le théâtre des opérations.
- Dieu porte-t-il des lunettes noires ?.

=== Essays ===
- Le théâtre des opérations: journal métaphysique et polémique - 1999.
- Laboratoire de catastrophe générale : Journal métaphysique et polémique 2000–2001.
- American Black Box: Le théâtre des opérations 2002-2006.

=== Short stories ===
- Là où tombent les anges (Where Angels fall) published in a supplement of Le Monde the 21 September 1995 for the 50th anniversary of the collection Série noire.

=== Translated in English ===
- Babylon Babies translation by Noura Wedell.

== Music ==
- Former keyboardist for Artefact
- Lyricist and singer on the album Utopia from the group No One Is Innocent
- Co-creator with Richard Pinhas of the musical project Schizotrope
- Collaboration with the punk rock group Dead Sexy Inc
