= Boom! (System of a Down song) =

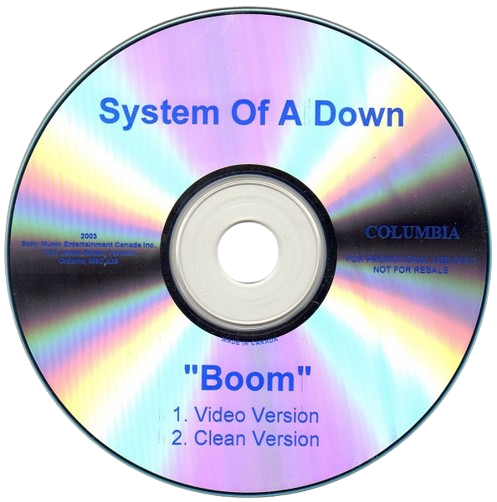
- Canadian promo

Promotional single by System of a Down

from the album Steal This Album!
- Released: March 18, 2003
- Studio: Cello (Hollywood)
- Length: 2:14
- Label: American; Columbia
- Songwriters: Serj Tankian; Daron Malakian
- Producers: Rick Rubin; Daron Malakian

System of a Down singles chronology
"Innervision" (2002)	"Boom!" (2003)	"B.Y.O.B." (2005)

Alternative cover
- Dutch promo

Music video
- "Boom!" on YouTube

"Boom!" is a song by American heavy metal band System of a Down. It was released as a promotional single from their third studio album, Steal This Album! (2002).

== Background ==
"Boom!" was released as the second and final promotional single from Steal This Album!. As in the case with most songs from Steal This Album!, it has only been played live on very few occasions, with only one confirmed performance.

Like their later song B.Y.O.B., it was written in protest against the Iraq War, more specifically, former President Bush's announcement for a "war on terror". After the September 11 attacks, George W. Bush launched an american-lead, international, "Global War on Terror" which planned on eradicating Al-Qaeda, the Taliban, and other middle eastern focused jihadist groups. Serj Tankian, the lead singer of System of a Down, wrote an essay where he said, "If we carry out bombings on Afghanistan or elsewhere to appease public demand, and very likely kill innocent civilians along the way, we'd be creating many more martyrs going to their deaths in retaliation against the retaliation. As shown from yesterday's events, you cannot stop a person who's ready to die."

The song was leaked on the Toxicity II bootleg under the name "Everytime", with Serj Tankian being the only vocalist in the song, rather than the whole band.

== Composition and lyrics ==
The song uses a simple AABA structure. In her essay "Boom! Goes the Global Protest Movement: Heavy Metal, Protest, and the Televisual in System of a Down’s 'Boom!' Music Video", Clare Neil King suggests that this structure enables protestors to quickly join in. It uses a Phrygian dominant scale common in heavy metal, but also often used to create a non-Western or exotic feel. King argues that in "Boom!", use of this scale hints at "the location of the Iraq war and the rich Arabic culture threatened by violence".

MTV described the song as being about "the horror of war and how governments throw exorbitant sums of money into the military and overlook other key domestic and international issues".

== Music video ==
For the music video, the band worked with filmmaker Michael Moore. The video uses footage from the anti-war protests on February 15, 2003. The video also shows a cartoon of George W. Bush, Saddam Hussein, Tony Blair, and Osama bin Laden riding rockets over a city, referencing the Four Horsemen of the Apocalypse.

Shortly after its release, the video was banned from MTV Europe. The Globe and Mail reported a viewer's offence at the video's imagery of the US president alongside terrorists, with another telling MTV the station would never be on in their house again.

Billboard reported guitarist Daron Malakian as saying "The possibility of the U.S. going to war with Iraq is an extremely personal issue for me because I have family who live there [...] we’d like to have the 'Boom!' video help change the way people think about the solution to our global problems. We want to make the idea of dropping bombs, of waging war seem as antiquated and ridiculous as it is today for an Afro-American to have to sit at the back of the bus."

== Track listing ==
All lyrics are written by Serj Tankian & Daron Malakian.

Australian promo single
No.	Title	Music	Length
1.	"Boom! (Clean Version)"	Daron Malakian, Shavo Odajian	2:17
2.	"Boom! (Album Version)"	Daron Malakian, Shavo Odajian	2:14

Canadian promo single
No.	Title	Music	Length
1.	"Boom! (Video Version)"	Daron Malakian, Shavo Odajian	2:51
2.	"Boom! (Clean Version)"	Daron Malakian, Shavo Odajian	2:15
