= Achozen =

American band

- Origin: Los Angeles, California, U.S.
- Genres: Experimental hip hop
- Years active: 2005–2008 (hiatus)
- Labels: urSESSION
- Members: Shavo Odadjian; RZA; Kinetic 9 Reverend William Burke

Achozen ([pronounced: UH-choh-zen]) (occasionally typeset as AcHoZeN) is a supergroup by System of a Down bassist Shavo Odadjian, Wu-Tang Clan member RZA, Killarmy member Kinetic 9, and Wu-Tang Clan affiliate Reverend William Burke. Their debut album has been completed and set for release for several years now, and it is unknown when or if the album will be released, considering Odadjian's commitments to System of a Down, who reunited in 2011. In July 2015, the group released a boombox digital collection of 8 songs recorded over the last few years. A standard album is still in the making, though songs are already available. After both Wu-Tang and System of a Down organized their respective reunions, material was released.

== Music style ==
The music of Achozen is described by one writer as: "space hip hop, rap without a coast or even a planet. Instead, each song revolves around a solar system of feeling. The album explores and exorcises a spectrum of emotions, as each track delves into either pain, ecstasy, hate or hope. Utilizing sitar and violin, Shavo breaks the mold, playing live instruments across the album, as he constructs beats with a cosmic fluidity".

The album features funk musician George Clinton (P-Funk), Red Hot Chili Peppers guitarist John Frusciante, Wu-Tang affiliate Killah Priest, Wu-Tang Clan member GZA, Sick Jacken of Psycho Realm, and Leggezin Fin. The song "Deuces" is heard at the introduction of the film Babylon A.D. (2008). Achozen's first live show was at the Key Club in L.A on December 1, 2006.

On November 13, 2009, the second Achozen track "Salute/Sacrifice" was released as a free download on Odadjian's online art district and networking site, urSESSION.com. The AcHoZeN album was anticipated to be released in mid-2010. That year, it was announced that the album was still on hold.

The Achozen album was set to be released with a special DVD with the album's main disc. Shavo considered giving the album out for free, having a completed work, seeing as how much time had passed. The album was ultimately released in a fixed boombox collection kit in 2015, and both Shavo and RZA have stated more songs could potentially be released in other formats.

== Singles ==
Achozen has released two singles:

- "Deuces", hip hop/rapcore song, was used in the opening of the action sci-fi, blockbuster film Babylon A.D.. The song was used as the background to the sequence which introduces the mercenary character played by actor Vin Diesel.
- "Salute/Sacrifice"

== Members ==
- Shavo Odadjian – vocals, guitar
- RZA – vocals, keyboards, samples, beats, guitar
- Kinetic 9 – vocals
- Reverend William Burke – vocals

=== Additional performers ===
- John the Baptist – vocals
- ShoGun Assasson – vocals
- Killah Priest – vocals
- 4th Disciple – turntables
- John Frusciante - guitar
