= Toxicity (album) =

Studio album by System of a Down
- Released: September 4, 2001
- Recorded: March–July 2001
- Studio: Cello (Hollywood)
- Genres: Alternative metal; nu metal
- Length: 44:07
- Labels: American; Columbia
- Producers: Rick Rubin; Daron Malakian

System of a Down chronology
System of a Down (1998)	Toxicity (2001)	Steal This Album! (2002)

Singles from Toxicity
- 1. "Chop Suey!" Released: August 13, 2001; 2. "Toxicity" Released: January 22, 2002; 3. "Aerials" Released: June 11, 2002

Toxicity is the second studio album by the American heavy metal band System of a Down, released on September 4, 2001, by American Recordings and Columbia Records. Expanding on their 1998 eponymous debut album, Toxicity incorporates more melody, harmonies, and singing than the band's first album. Categorized primarily as alternative metal and nu metal, the album features elements of multiple genres, including folk, progressive rock, jazz, and Armenian and Greek music, including prominent use of instruments like the sitar, banjo, keyboards, and piano. It contains a wide array of political and non-political themes, such as mass incarceration, the CIA, the environment, police brutality, drug addiction, scientific reductionism, and groupies.

Toxicity was recorded at Cello Studios in Hollywood, California. Over 30 songs were recorded, but the band narrowed the number of songs on the album to 14. The album peaked at number one on both the Billboard 200 and the Canadian Albums Chart, selling 220,000 copies in its first week of release. It was certified 7× Platinum by the Recording Industry Association of America (RIAA) in August 2026, signifying at least seven million copies sold in the United States. All of Toxicity's singles reached the Billboard Hot 100. The final single, "Aerials", went to number one on both the Mainstream Rock Tracks and the Modern Rock Tracks charts. Toxicity received highly positive ratings and reviews from critics, among them perfect ratings from AllMusic, Kerrang!, and Blabbermouth.net. Many critics praised the album's sound and innovation, and it ranked on multiple "best albums" lists.

The promotional shows for Toxicity resulted in a number of controversial incidents. A six-hour riot ensued at a free concert in Hollywood the day before the album's release as a result of the show's cancellation due to the venue being overcrowded; the crowd in attendance was estimated to be at least twice the size that was expected. Another scheduled System of a Down performance was canceled to prevent a similar riot. The band then toured with Slipknot on the Pledge of Allegiance Tour, and bassist Shavo Odadjian was harassed, racially profiled, and physically beaten by guards when he tried to enter backstage at a concert in October 2001.

In 2021, the staff of Revolver included the album in their list of the "20 Essential Nu-Metal Albums". In 2025, Rae Lemeshow-Barooshian of Loudwire included the album in her list of "the top 50 nu-metal albums of all time", ranking it at second.

== Music, writing, and recording ==
"Going into it, I knew Serj wanted to sing more, so I guess that was a kind of a progression and an evolution for the band. I wanted to do all that, yet not lose the heaviness of the band and I guess the hard, punk, metal aspect. You could lose that sometimes when you get a little too eclectic. So we were just trying to balance that fine line and not lose the fans."

— Daron Malakian, speaking about Toxicity's sound.

Primarily considered an alternative metal and nu metal album, Toxicity has also been described as thrash metal, art metal, hard rock, progressive metal, and heavy metal. Toxicity features elements of multiple genres of music: folk, progressive rock, jazz, hip-hop, Middle Eastern music, and Greek music. Guitarist Daron Malakian said that he "wanted to add a bit more harmony for" himself "in the songs and that required tastefully mixing in some softer guitars between the really heavy parts". Malakian also cited the Beatles as an influence on Toxicity. Sounds of instruments other than drums, vocals, electric guitar and bass guitar, such as sitar, banjo, keyboards and piano, are also featured on Toxicity. The majority of the album's music was written in the tuning of drop C.

System of a Down recorded over thirty songs during the recording of Toxicity but narrowed the number of songs on the album to fourteen. Several of these recorded songs that didn't make it onto Toxicity were re-recorded for System of a Down's next studio album Steal This Album!, an album released in 2002. Toxicity was recorded at Cello Studios in Hollywood, California, mixed at Enterprise Studios in Burbank, California, and mastered at Oasis Mastering in Studio City, California. According to bassist Shavo Odadjian, the song "Chop Suey!" is "about drug addiction, but [System of a Down took] something really serious and made it a little quacky". Vocalist Serj Tankian compared the song to Guns N' Roses' "Mr. Brownstone". "Prison Song" is about mass incarceration. Serj Tankian said: "It's about the unfairness of mandatory minimum sentences and how there are about 2,000,000 Americans in jail, and a lot of them are in there for marijuana possession and things of that sort. [...] Instead of rehabilitating men who have drug problems, they're throwing them in prison. That's not really solving anything." Tankian said that "Prison Song" also addresses "how drug money is used to rig elections in other countries by the CIA". "Needles" is about drug addiction, comparing drugs to a tapeworm in the chorus "Bounce" is about group sex. "Psycho" is about groupies. "ATWA" (an acronym for "Air, Trees, Water, Animals") is about Charles Manson's beliefs on the environment. Malakian has said that "[Manson is] in jail for the wrong reasons. I think he had an unfair trial". "Deer Dance" is about the protests surrounding the 2000 Democratic National Convention.

== Promotion and touring ==
On September 3, 2001, System of a Down had planned on launching Toxicity at a free concert in Hollywood, California as a "thank you" to fans. The concert, which was to be held in a parking lot, was set up to accommodate 3,500 people; however, an estimated 7,000 to 10,000 fans showed up. Because of the large excess number of fans, the performance was cancelled by police officers just before System of a Down took the stage. No announcement was made that the concert had been cancelled. Fans waited for more than an hour for the band to appear, but when a banner hanging at the back of the stage that read "System of a Down" was removed by security, the audience rushed the stage, destroying all the band's touring gear (approximately $30,000 worth of equipment) and began to riot, throwing rocks at police, breaking windows, and knocking over portable toilets. The riot lasted six hours, during which six arrests were made. The band's manager, David "Beno" Benveniste, later said that the riot could have been avoided if System of a Down had been permitted to perform or had they been allowed to make a statement at the concert regarding the cancellation. System of a Down's scheduled in-store performance the next day was cancelled to prevent a similar riot.

Later that month, System of a Down embarked on tour in the United States and Mexico with Slipknot. During their concert at Grand Rapids, Michigan's Van Andel Arena in October 2001, Odadjian alleges he was harassed, racially profiled and physically beaten by some guards when he attempted to enter backstage. Slipknot had instructed that no one could enter backstage due to their use of fireworks. After the attack, he received medical help from the arena personnel and the police in place. Odadjian then filed a lawsuit against DuHadway Kendall Security, the company the guards were working for. Despite this incident, the tour, as a whole, was a success and System of a Down later co-headlined the Pledge of Allegiance leg of Slipknot's Iowa World Tour.

== Reception ==
=== Critical ===
Professional ratings
Aggregate scores
Source	Rating
Metacritic	73/100
Review scores
Source	Rating
AllMusic	5/5 stars
Alternative Press	9/10
Blabbermouth.net	10/10
Entertainment Weekly	B−
Kerrang!	5/5
Los Angeles Times	3/4 stars
Pitchfork	8.2/10
Q	4/5 stars
Rolling Stone	3.5/5 stars
The Rolling Stone Album Guide	4/5 stars

On review aggregator website Metacritic, Toxicity holds a score of 73 out of 100, based on reviews from nine critics, which indicates "generally favorable reviews". AllMusic writer Eduardo Rivadavia called Toxicity "hands down one of 2001's top metal releases" and wrote that the album "may well prove to be a lasting heavy metal classic to boot". Toxicity is one of only 21 albums to achieve a perfect rating from Blabbermouth.net, with writer Don Kaye praising System of a Down in a contemporary review of the album as "one of the few bands that people may still be talking about ten years from now". Drowned in Sound writer Don Kaye praised the band as "probably the most vital band around in the big, wide world of metal right now". Ben Myers of Kerrang! stated that the band had "gone and bettered" their debut album and hailed Toxicity as "metal album of the year, hands down". Q wrote that Toxicity "matches Slipknot for manic intensity while employing a freeform approach to songcraft which invites comparison to the lunatic-fringe rock of the '60s".

Referring to Toxicity as "both manic and schizoid", Keith Harris of Rolling Stone noted Tankian's ability to veer "easily from sing-rap rhythm to Korn-ish hysterics to demonic baritone growl to doomily ruminative" and that "the music insists on forward motion without trapping itself in a thrashy lock-step rut". Tom Sinclair of Entertainment Weekly called the album "strange and engaging", with a wide variety of sounds which "all adds up to bizarro type of metal that has a warped majesty and strength". Robert Christgau of The Village Voice cited "Prison Song" and "Bounce" as highlights and later assigned the album a one-star honorable rating. Spin's Joe Gross wrote that the band "have an undeniable nerd-prog charm". Uncut, on the other hand, panned Toxicity as "virtually unlistenable".

=== Commercial ===
Toxicity peaked at number one on the Billboard 200, selling 220,000 copies in its first week of release. The album also topped the Canadian Albums Chart. Toxicity sold at least 2,700,000 copies in the United States, and at least 12,000,000 copies worldwide. On August 28, 2026, the album was certified 7× Platinum by the Recording Industry Association of America.

All of the album's singles reached the Billboard Hot 100; "Chop Suey!" peaked at number 76, "Toxicity" at number 70, and "Aerials" at number 55. "Aerials" would remain the band's biggest domestic hit until "B.Y.O.B." surpassed it, reaching number 27 in 2005. "Aerials" peaked at number one on the Mainstream Rock Songs chart and number one on the Alternative Songs chart. "Chop Suey!" and "Toxicity" were both top ten hits. In 2005, Toxicity went to number one on the Catalog Albums chart. Added to the 2001 Clear Channel memorandum, "Chop Suey!" was temporarily pulled from playlists of most radio stations after the September 11 attacks in 2001, as it featured some lyrics that Clear Channel deemed inappropriate following the attacks. The song returned to the airwaves when things settled down.

=== Accolades ===
The album is listed on Blender's 500 CDs You Must Own. MusicRadar held a public poll and Toxicity was ranked as the 28th greatest heavy metal album on its list of The 50 Greatest Heavy Metal Albums of All Time. The album is ranked number 44 on Rolling Stone's 100 Best Albums of the Decade for 2000s and 27th on the magazine's "100 Greatest Metal Albums of All Time". Toxicity was voted the 27th best album of the year in The Village Voice's annual Pazz & Jop critics poll for 2001. Spin named the album one of The 300 Best Albums Of The Past 30 Years, with Toxicity being one of the highest-listed heavy metal albums on the list. Spin also named Toxicity the Album of the Year in 2001, and finally ranked it number 38 on its list of The 40 Greatest Metal Albums Of All Time. Kludge ranked it number five on their list of best albums of 2001. Alternative Press ranked it number nine on its 25 Best Albums of 2001. Mojo ranked it number 93 on its 100 Modern Classics. The album won a 2001 Metal Edge Readers' Choice Award for Album of the Year. Loudwire listed the album at number one on its list of Top 11 Metal Albums of the 2000s, number two on the Top 100 Hard Rock + Metal Albums Of The 21st Century, and number 11 on its list of Top 50 Metal Albums of All Time. NME listed the album at number six on its list of 20 Greatest Metal Albums Ever. Metal Hammer declared Toxicity the best album of 2001. The Observer ranked Toxicity as one of the Top 50 Albums Of The Decade, at number 34. In 2007, The Guardian placed the album on its list of the 1000 Albums To Hear Before You Die. Entertainment Weekly also put Toxicity on its list of the 100 Best Albums of the 1983–2008 Period, at number 90. Revolver named Toxicity the eighth greatest metal album of all time on its list of the 69 Greatest Metal Albums Of All Time. The album was included on The A.V. Club's list of the best metal records of the 2000s. PopMatters ranked Toxicity at 62 on its Best Albums of the 2000s list. "Chop Suey!" was nominated for Best Metal Performance at the 44th Grammy Awards in 2002 and "Aerials" was nominated for Best Hard Rock Performance at the 45th Grammy Awards the following year. In 2020, the album was included at the 100 Best Albums of the 21st Century list of Stacker, being ranked at 85.

== Track listing ==
All lyrics are written by Serj Tankian except where noted; all music is composed by Daron Malakian except where noted.

Original release
No.	Title	Lyrics	Music	Length
1.	"Prison Song"	Tankian, Malakian		3:21
2.	"Needles"	Tankian, Malakian	Tankian, Malakian	3:13
3.	"Deer Dance"	Tankian, Malakian		2:54
4.	"Jet Pilot"		Shavo Odadjian, Malakian	2:06
5.	"X"			1:58
6.	"Chop Suey!"	Tankian, Malakian		3:30
7.	"Bounce"		Odadjian, Malakian	1:54
8.	"Forest"			4:00
9.	"ATWA" (Air Trees Water Animals)	Tankian, Malakian		2:56
10.	"Science"			2:42
11.	"Shimmy"		Tankian	1:50
12.	"Toxicity"		Odadjian, Malakian	3:38
13.	"Psycho"	Tankian, Malakian		3:45
14.	"Aerials"	Tankian, Malakian		3:55
15.	"Der Voghormia" (featuring Arto Tunçboyacıyan) ( (Note: "Arto" is an adaptation of "Der Voghormia" (meaning "Lord Have Mercy"), a traditional Armenian church hymn. It is combined with "Aerials" (track 14) on physical releases as a hidden track.))	instrumental	Tunçboyacıyan	2:13
Total length:				44:07

Japanese edition bonus track
No.	Title	Music	Length
8.	"Johnny" ( (Note: "Johnny" is put as the eighth track on Toxicity on the album's Japanese edition, pushing all tracks 8–14 on the album's normal track listing one track number forward.))	Tankian	2:07
Total length:			46:14

=== French special edition ===
Bonus CD
No.	Title	Music	Length
1.	"Sugar" (Live)	Odadjian, Malakian	2:27
2.	"War?" (Live)		2:48
3.	"Suite-Pee" (Live)		2:58
4.	"Know" (Live)	Odadjian, Malakian, Tankian	3:03
5.	"Johnny"	Tankian	2:07
Total length:			13:23

=== Blue edition ===
Bonus DVD
No.	Title	Lyrics	Music	Length
1.	"Toxicity" (Music video)		Malakian, Odadjian	2:27
2.	"Chop Suey!" (Live)	Tankian, Malakian		2:48
3.	"Prison Song" (Live)	Tankian, Malakian		3:21
4.	"Bounce" (Live)		Malakian, Odadjian	1:54
Total length:				10:30

- The Red Edition of the album features a bonus video disc with a 9:54-long behind-the-scenes video about the production of the record.

== Personnel ==
All personnel credits for Toxicity are adapted from the album's liner notes.

System of a Down

- Daron Malakian – guitars, vocals; sitar on "Aerials"; production
- Serj Tankian – vocals, keyboards; co-production, strings writing
- Shavo Odadjian – bass; art direction, album art concepts, co-label art
- John Dolmayan – drums; photography, inside collage art

Additional musicians

- Arto Tunçboyacıyan – additional vocals and music
- Marc Mann – strings arrangement, conducting, additional strings writing

Production

- Rick Rubin – production; additional piano
- Andy Wallace – mixing
- David Schiffman – engineer
- Greg Collins – additional engineering
- Darren Mora – additional engineering, assistant engineer
- Al Sanderson – assistant engineer
- Ryan McCormick – assistant engineer
- Jim Champagne – assistant engineer
- Rich Balmer – mixdown engineer
- Lindsay Chase – production coordinator
- Eddy Schreyer – mastering

Artwork

- Martyn Atkins – photography (studio)
- Glen E. Friedman – photography (back cover, water)
- Hallie Sirota – photography
- Mark Wakefield – cover art
- Brandy Flower – art direction, inside collage art
- System of a Down – album art concepts

== Charts ==
=== Weekly charts ===
2001 weekly chart performance for Toxicity
Chart (2001)	Peak position
Australian Albums (ARIA)	6
Austrian Albums (Ö3 Austria)	16
Belgian Albums (Ultratop Flanders)	8
Belgian Albums (Ultratop Wallonia)	25
Canadian Albums (Billboard)	1
Danish Albums (Hitlisten)	31
Dutch Albums (Album Top 100)	17
Finnish Albums (Suomen virallinen lista)	8
French Albums (SNEP)	23
German Albums (Offizielle Top 100)	23
Greek Albums (IFPI)	8
Irish Albums (IRMA)	17
Italian Albums (FIMI)	23
Japanese Albums (Oricon)	49
New Zealand Albums (RMNZ)	7
Polish Albums (ZPAV)	17
Scottish Albums (Official Charts)	15
Swedish Albums (Sverigetopplistan)	47
Swiss Albums (Schweizer Hitparade)	31
UK Albums (Official Charts)	13
UK Rock & Metal Albums (Official Charts)	3
US Billboard 200	1

2005 weekly chart performance for Toxicity
Chart (2005)	Peak position
US Top Catalog Albums (Billboard)	1

2018 weekly chart performance for Toxicity
Chart (2018)	Peak position
US Top Alternative Albums (Billboard)	16
US Top Hard Rock Albums (Billboard)	8
US Top Rock Albums (Billboard)	38
US Indie Store Album Sales (Billboard)	8
US Vinyl Albums (Billboard)	4

2020–2026 weekly chart performance for Toxicity
Chart (2020–2026)	Peak position
Croatian International Albums (HDU)	31
German Rock & Metal Albums (Offizielle Top 100)	12
Hungarian Physical Albums (MAHASZ)	7
Lithuanian Albums (AGATA)	53
Portuguese Albums (AFP)	22

=== Year-end charts ===
2001 year-end chart performance for Toxicity
Chart (2001)	Position
Australian Albums (ARIA)	81
Canadian Albums (Nielsen SoundScan)	76
Dutch Albums (Album Top 100)	93
UK Albums (OCC)	140
US Billboard 200	101
Worldwide Albums (IFPI)	40

2002 year-end chart performance for Toxicity
Chart (2002)	Position
Australian Albums (ARIA)	23
Austrian Albums (Ö3 Austria)	58
Belgian Albums (Ultratop Flanders)	33
Belgian Alternative Albums (Ultratop Flanders)	17
Belgian Albums (Ultratop Wallonia)	66
Canadian Albums (Nielsen SoundScan)	51
Canadian Alternative Albums (Nielsen SoundScan)	13
Canadian Metal Albums (Nielsen SoundScan)	7
Dutch Albums (Album Top 100)	76
European Top 100 Albums (Music & Media)	87
German Albums (Offizielle Top 100)	60
New Zealand Albums (RMNZ)	19
UK Albums (OCC)	121
US Billboard 200	28
Worldwide Albums (IFPI)	41

2003 year-end chart performance for Toxicity
Chart (2003)	Position
Australian Heavy Rock & Metal Albums (ARIA)	17

2016 year-end chart performance for Toxicity
Chart (2016)	Position
Belgian Midprice Albums (Ultratop Wallonia)	44

2020 year-end chart performance for Toxicity
Chart (2020)	Position
Portuguese Albums (AFP)	68

2024 year-end chart performance for Toxicity
Chart (2024)	Position
Belgian Albums (Ultratop Flanders)	194

2025 year-end chart performance for Toxicity
Chart (2025)	Position
Belgian Albums (Ultratop Flanders)	133
Belgian Albums (Ultratop Wallonia)	173
Hungarian Albums (MAHASZ)	81
Polish Albums (ZPAV)	96

=== Decade-end charts ===
Decade-end chart performance for Toxicity
Chart (2000–2009)	Position
US Billboard 200	123

== Certifications ==
Certifications for Toxicity
Region	Certification	Certified units/sales
Argentina (CAPIF)	Gold	20,000^{^}
Australia (ARIA)	3× Platinum	210,000^{^}
Austria (IFPI Austria)	Gold	20,000^{*}
Belgium (BRMA)	Gold	25,000^{*}
Brazil (Pro-Música Brasil)	Gold	50,000^{*}
Canada (Music Canada)	2× Platinum	200,000^{^}
Denmark (IFPI Danmark)	3× Platinum	60,000^{‡}
Germany (BVMI)	Gold	150,000^{^}
Italy (FIMI) sales since 2009	2× Platinum	100,000^{‡}
Mexico (AMPROFON)	Gold	75,000^{^}
Netherlands (NVPI)	Gold	40,000^{^}
New Zealand (RMNZ)	3× Platinum	45,000^{‡}
Poland (ZPAV)	Platinum	20,000^{‡}
Portugal (AFP)	Gold	3,500^{‡}
Switzerland (IFPI Switzerland)	Gold	20,000^{^}
United Kingdom (BPI)	2× Platinum	600,000^{‡}
United States (RIAA)	7× Platinum	7,000,000^{‡}
Summaries
Europe (IFPI)	Platinum	1,000,000^{*}
^{*} Sales figures based on certification alone.^{^} Shipments figures based on certification alone.^{‡} Sales+streaming figures based on certification alone.

== Bibliography ==
- System of a Down (2001). System of a Down - Toxicity. Hal Leonard. ISBN 978-0634037788.
- Lawson, Dom (August 18, 2001). "System Album Revealed!". Kerrang! (866). UK: EMAP: 10–11. ISSN 0262-6624.
