= Toxicity (song) =

- US CD single

Single by System of a Down

from the album Toxicity
- B-side: "Störaged"
- Released: January 22, 2002
- Recorded: 2001
- Studio: Cello (Hollywood)
- Genre: Nu metal; progressive metal
- Length: 3:39
- Label: American; Columbia
- Composers: Daron Malakian; Shavo Odadjian
- Lyricist: Serj Tankian
- Producers: Daron Malakian; Rick Rubin

System of a Down singles chronology
"Chop Suey!" (2001)	"Toxicity" (2002)	"Aerials" (2002)

Alternative cover
- UK/European release. Colors may vary between red, grey or white.

Music video
- "Toxicity" on YouTube

"Toxicity" is a song created by Armenian-American heavy metal band System of a Down. It was released in 2002 as the second single from their second studio album Toxicity. The song was written by band members Daron Malakian, Shavo Odadjian, and Serj Tankian. It is known for its dynamic chorus, aggressive vocals, and prominent drum beat. The song is predominantly in triple meter, alternating between 6/4, 12/8 and 4/4 time. The guitar during the verse plays in 6/4 using a 2+2+2 phrasing while the heavy part ("somewhere between the sacred silence and sleep") makes use of a hemiola with the guitar switching to a 3+3+3+3 pattern while the drums remain in compound duple meter until the bridge. The song was ranked number 14 on VH1's 40 Greatest Metal Songs, and was called a nu metal classic by Stylus Magazine.

== Background ==
"Toxicity," an important song for System of a Down, was initially brought to the band by bassist Shavo Odadjian, who introduced the composition under the title "Version 7.0." Odadjian conceived this title in reference to the then-popular AOL software, stating, "When this song comes out, it'll be on Version 7.0, and we'd be telling the future." Despite the band's reputation for guitarist Daron Malakian and vocalist Serj Tankian as the principal songwriters, Odadjian's original concept played a crucial role in the song's development.

During the recording process, the band, encouraged by producer Rick Rubin to "over-write," entered the studio with an extensive repertoire of approximately 44 songs. However, "Toxicity" nearly went overlooked, with Odadjian recalling that it had "fallen through the cracks." He reflected, "I felt so good about it, and it wasn't taken well." It was only when Malakian revisited the composition that the song was fully realized, marking it as a significant addition to their album.

== Recording ==
"There were times when we fuckin' threw down. [Once], John and I were totally going at it. My lip was all cut up, and I took a microphone stand and hit him across the head and his head was all bashed in. Shavo and Serj were looking at us saying, 'Awww, man, we're done.' But right after we fought, we took each other to the hospital and got stitched up right next to each other. Both of us were sitting there laughing, saying, 'This is one of the coolest moments in the history of our band.'"

— Daron Malakian, speaking about the conflicts during the recording of "Toxicity".

The recording of "Toxicity" involved intense collaboration and conflict among band members, leading to its distinctive sound. The song's beat was crafted by drummer John Dolmayan, who drew inspiration from a moment of irritation with Odadjian. Dolmayan humorously recounted how he mimicked Odadjian's gestures while trying to find the right rhythm, ultimately leading to one of his most recognizable beats. Dolmayan wrote, "I was trying to figure out beats. Shavo was right in front of me and wouldn't stop talking. I was like, 'Shavo, give me a second to try and come up with something.' He was like, 'Why don't you try it like this?' He was moving his arms up and down. To mock him, I did what I thought he was doing. That beat came out of complete irritation. It was very much just, 'Get the fuck out of my face. I'm going to do this so you leave.'"

Malakian's vision for "Toxicity" steered the band toward a more melodic and anthemic direction, expanding their sound beyond their metal roots. His focus on crafting songs with larger choruses was a departure from the band's earlier style, reflecting an evolution in their musical approach. This shift was not without its challenges; intense disagreements sometimes erupted into physical altercations, exemplified by a notable brawl between Malakian and Dolmayan. Despite the violence, the aftermath of their confrontation fostered a renewed sense of camaraderie, propelling the band to complete "Toxicity" alongside other key tracks like "Chop Suey!" in a burst of creativity. Dolmayan reflected, "Maybe [the fight] was positive for us because the week after hospitalization, we went in, and 'Chop Suey!' and 'Toxicity' were completed."

== Composition and lyrics ==
"Toxicity" is a defining track within the nu metal genre, characterized by its fusion of heavy metal, punk, and alternative rock elements. It has also been described as progressive metal, with Brendan Appleton of Kerrang! Radio arguing that "they certainly verge more towards progressive metal on this track." He challenged critics for their use of the label "nu metal" on the vast amount of artists, stating that "you'd certainly never say that Evanescence and SOAD were similar." As one of the standout songs from the album, it exemplifies the band's ability to transcend the conventions of the early-2000s Ozzfest circuit. According to Dominick Suzanne-Mayer of Consequence, System of a Down is "arguably one of the better bands to emerge during the period," with "Toxicity" standing as a testament to their artistic ambition.

The song's composition features a dynamic interplay of aggressive instrumentation and melodic hooks, driven by Daron Malakian's vision to evolve the band's sound beyond traditional heavy metal. He noted, "I liked songs like 'Aerials,' 'Toxicity,' and 'ATWA' that brought an evolution to our sound," indicating a shift towards anthemic choruses and complex arrangements that address deeper themes of societal dysfunction. The track is also notable for its intense drumming, with John Dolmayan's beat emerging from a moment of frustration during recording. This dynamic energy is particularly evident in the breakdown at the end of the song, which showcases Serj Tankian's inimitable vocals at their peak. As noted by music critic Dominick Suzanne-Mayer, "join us in going absolutely goddamn wild to that breakdown," highlighting how the song remains a powerful representation of the band's innovative spirit and impact on the nu metal genre.

Lyrically, "Toxicity" is filled with vivid imagery and cultural references. The line "eating seeds as a pastime activity" draws from Armenian culture, where snacking on roasted sunflower seeds is a common tradition. Malakian explained, "My family gets [sunflower seeds] raw... a lot of Armenians do this," using this imagery to juxtapose the mundanity of life with the song's broader commentary on societal issues. Another aspect of the song is the lyric "sacred silence and sleep," which reflects a deep connection to Native American spirituality. Serj Tankian has noted that "sacred silence" alludes to the spiritual understanding within Native American cultures, serving as a state of meditation where one can find both loss and discovery. He cites inspiration from the works of Tom Brown Jr., a survivalist and author who explores Native American wisdom, emphasizing the importance of living harmoniously with nature. Tankian elaborates that the lyric encapsulates a unique moment experienced during REM sleep, where meditation and consciousness intertwine.

== Music video ==
The video was directed by Marcos Siega and Shavo Odadjian. The beginning of the video shows the Hollywood Walk of Fame then cuts to the band. Daron Malakian can be seen wearing a Los Angeles Kings jersey with his last name on the back most of the time in the video. A closeup from behind John Dolmayan's drum kit reveals a double bass pedal attachment even though he doesn't use it during the song. During the verses, a projector shows homeless people lined against the streets. After the second chorus, Malakian is seen playing the fast riff in fast motion while the band freezes and a crowd slowly appears. The rest of the band resumes as they all come in. The crowd sings along with the band as well as forming a circle pit both in the light and in the dark with glow-sticks. Similar to a scene in the "Chop Suey" video where Serj Tankian is seen eating chop suey, the band is shown eating seeds, corresponding with the lyrics "Eating seeds as a pastime activity". The video ends with a shot of the Andromeda Galaxy.

As of January 2025, the song has surpassed 1 billion views on YouTube.

== Track listing ==
All lyrics are written by Serj Tankian.

CD single
No.	Title	Music	Length
1.	"Toxicity"	Shavo Odadjian; Daron Malakian	3:39
2.	"X" (Live)	Daron Malakian	3:02
3.	"Suggestions" (Live)	Daron Malakian	2:44
4.	"Marmalade"	Daron Malakian	2:59
5.	"Toxicity" (Video Version)	Shavo Odadjian; Daron Malakian	3:43

All lyrics are written by Serj Tankian.

Australian single
No.	Title	Music	Length
1.	"Toxicity"	Shavo Odadjian; Daron Malakian	3:39
2.	"X" (Live)	Daron Malakian	3:05
3.	"Suggestions" (Live)	Daron Malakian	2:44
4.	"Sugar" (Video Version)	Shavo Odadjian; Daron Malakian	3:28

All lyrics are written by Serj Tankian.

UK CD1
No.	Title	Music	Length
1.	"Toxicity"	Shavo Odadjian; Daron Malakian	3:42
2.	"X" (Live)	Daron Malakian	3:05
3.	"Suggestions" (Live)	Daron Malakian	2:44

UK CD2
No.	Title	Lyrics	Music	Length
1.	"Toxicity"	Serj Tankian	Shavo Odadjian; Daron Malakian	3:41
2.	"Marmalade"	Serj Tankian	Daron Malakian	3:02
3.	"Metro" (Explicit Version)	John Crawford	John Crawford	3:00

All lyrics are written by Serj Tankian.

7" single
No.	Title	Music	Length
1.	"Toxicity"	Shavo Odadjian; Daron Malakian	3:39
2.	"Störagéd"	Daron Malakian	1:19

== Charts ==
Weekly chart performance for "Toxicity"
Chart (2002)	Peak position
Australia (ARIA)	39
Belgium (Ultratip Bubbling Under Flanders)	10
Canada (Nielsen SoundScan)	46
Germany (GfK)	88
Netherlands (Single Top 100)	75
Ireland (IRMA)	47
Switzerland (Schweizer Hitparade)	90
Scottish Singles Sales (Official Charts)	25
UK Singles (Official Charts)	25
UK Rock & Metal (Official Charts)	4
US Billboard Hot 100	70
US Alternative Airplay (Billboard)	3
US Mainstream Rock Airplay (Billboard)	10

2025 weekly chart performance for "Toxicity"
Chart (2025)	Peak position
Brazil Hot 100 (Billboard)	72

== Certifications ==
Certifications for "Toxicity"
Region	Certification	Certified units/sales
Denmark (IFPI Danmark)	Platinum	90,000^{‡}
Germany (BVMI)	Gold	250,000^{‡}
Italy (FIMI)	2× Platinum	400,000^{‡}
New Zealand (RMNZ)	3× Platinum	90,000^{‡}
Portugal (AFP)	3× Platinum	30,000^{‡}
Spain (Promusicae)	Platinum	60,000^{‡}
United Kingdom (BPI)	Platinum	600,000^{‡}
United States (RIAA)	6× Platinum	6,000,000^{‡}
^{‡} Sales+streaming figures based on certification alone.
