= Home (August Burns Red album) =

Live album by August Burns Red
- Released: September 28, 2010
- Recorded: June 4, 2010
- Venue: Warehouse 54, Manheim, Pennsylvania
- Genre: Melodic metalcore
- Length: 69:19
- Label: Solid State
- Producer: Nick Esposito

August Burns Red chronology
Constellations (2009)	Home (2010)	Leveler (2011)

Home is the first live album by American metalcore band August Burns Red released through Solid State Records in a CD/DVD format. It was filmed live on June 4, 2010, at Warehouse 54 in Manheim, Pennsylvania and was released on September 28, 2010, through Solid State Records.

During the performance, August Burns Red played different songs from their previous albums. The performance featured many fan favorites from the band's three full-length albums, Constellations, 2007's Messengers and 2005's Thrill Seeker.

The show drew a sold-out crowd of 1250 people who wanted to participate in the performance, including some who traveled internationally, from as close as Montreal to as far as away as Amsterdam. Home also features a bonus video documentary called "Away Games" and featured August Burns Red being interviewed on how they were formed and what they had experienced. It also featured some footage of them touring and fans being interviewed on how August Burns Red had influenced their lives.

Professional ratings
Review scores
Source	Rating
Christian Music Zine	4/5 stars
Decoy Music	4/5 stars
Jesus Freak Hideout	4/5 stars
Kill Your Stereo	78%
Lexington Music Press	7/10 stars
Pure Grain Audio	8.5/10 stars

== Track listing ==
No.	Title	Original album	Length
1.	"Intro"		0:58
2.	"Back Burner"	Messengers	3:41
3.	"White Washed"	Constellations	4:18
4.	"Your Little Suburbia Is in Ruins"	Thrill Seeker	3:59
5.	"The Eleventh Hour"	Messengers	4:49
6.	"Meddler"	Constellations	3:56
7.	"The Truth of a Liar"	Messengers	4:56
8.	"Marianas Trench"	Constellations	5:27
9.	"Thirty and Seven"	Constellations	3:18
10.	"Existence"	Constellations	4:50
11.	"Meridian"	Constellations	5:55
12.	"A Shot Below the Belt"	Thrill Seeker	5:23
13.	"Up Against the Ropes"	Messengers	4:57
14.	"Composure"	Messengers	5:43
15.	"The Seventh Trumpet"	Thrill Seeker	7:07
Total length:			69:19

== Personnel ==
August Burns Red

- Jake Luhrs – lead vocals
- JB Brubaker – lead guitar
- Brent Rambler – rhythm guitar
- Dustin Davidson – bass, backing vocals
- Matt Greiner – drums, piano

Additional personnel

- Doug Spangenberg for Space Monkey Studios, Inc. – direction
- Nick Esposito – production
- Anderson Bradshaw for Space Monkey Studios, Inc. – editing
- Pete Robertson – live audio recording
- Jade Roser – live audio engineering
- Joshua Bowman – lighting direction
- Carson Slovak – mixing
- Troy Glessner – mastering
- Invisible Creature – art direction
- Ryan Clark – illustration, design
- John Awad – live photo
