= Les Racines du mal =

1995 novel by Maurice G. Dantec

- First edition
- Author: Maurice G. Dantec
- Language: French
- Publisher: Éditions Gallimard
- Publication date: 21 April 1995
- Publication place: France
- Pages: 635
- ISBN: 9782070494958

Les Racines du mal (The Roots Of Evil) is a 1995 crime novel by the French writer Maurice G. Dantec. Set in the near future, it tells the story of a knowledge engineer who is brought in by the police to find a group of serial killers. He is assisted by the "neuromatrice", an artificial intelligence he helped develop, which can access any computer system and create psychological profiles based on scattered hints and facts about a person.

The novel was published on 21 April 1995 by Éditions Gallimard, as part of the Série noire imprint. It received the Grand Prix de l'Imaginaire and the Prix Rosny-Aîné.
