= Shavo Odadjian =

American bassist (born 1974)

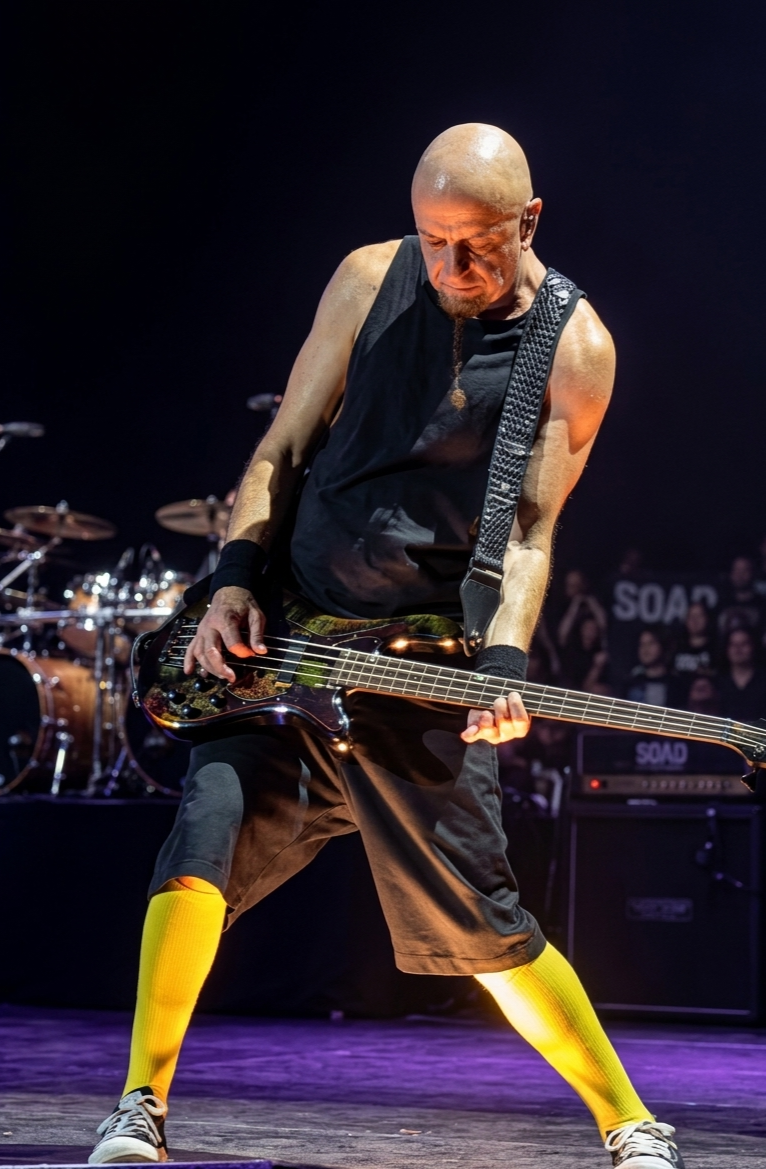
- Odadjian performing with System of a Down in 2026

Background information
- Also known as: DJ Tactic; DJ DecompozeR
- Born: Shavarsh Odadjian; April 22, 1974 (age 52); Yerevan, Armenian SSR
- Origin: Los Angeles, California, U.S.
- Genres: Alternative metal; nu metal; experimental hip-hop; hard rock; progressive metal; thrash metal
- Occupations: Musician; songwriter
- Instruments: Bass; guitar
- Years active: 1992–present
- Member of: System of a Down; North Kingsley; Seven Hours After Violet
- Spouse: Sonia Odadjian

Shavarsh "Shavo" Odadjian (Armenian: Շավարշ "Շավո" Օդաջյան; born April 22, 1974) is an Armenian-American musician, best known as the bassist of the alternative metal band System of a Down. He also plays bass in a trap group called North Kingsley and in the metal band Seven Hours After Violet.

During System of a Down's hiatus from 2006 to 2010, Odadjian collaborated with Wu-Tang Clan founder RZA on a project called AcHoZeN, which contributed a number of songs to the motion picture Babylon A.D. A compilation album was released in 2015. Odadjian is also credited with the musical scoring of the film, alongside RZA and Hans Zimmer.

== Early life ==
Odadjian was born in Yerevan, Armenian SSR, Soviet Union. He moved to Los Angeles at the age of five and attended the Alex Pilibos Elementary School, an Armenian parochial school, along with future bandmates Daron Malakian and Serj Tankian.

During his youth, Odadjian has stated that he spent most of his time skateboarding and listening to punk rock and heavy metal music. Among others, he credits Dead Kennedys, Slayer, Black Sabbath and Metallica as his favorite bands, and the most substantial influence on his musical development and career.

== Recording career ==
=== System of a Down ===
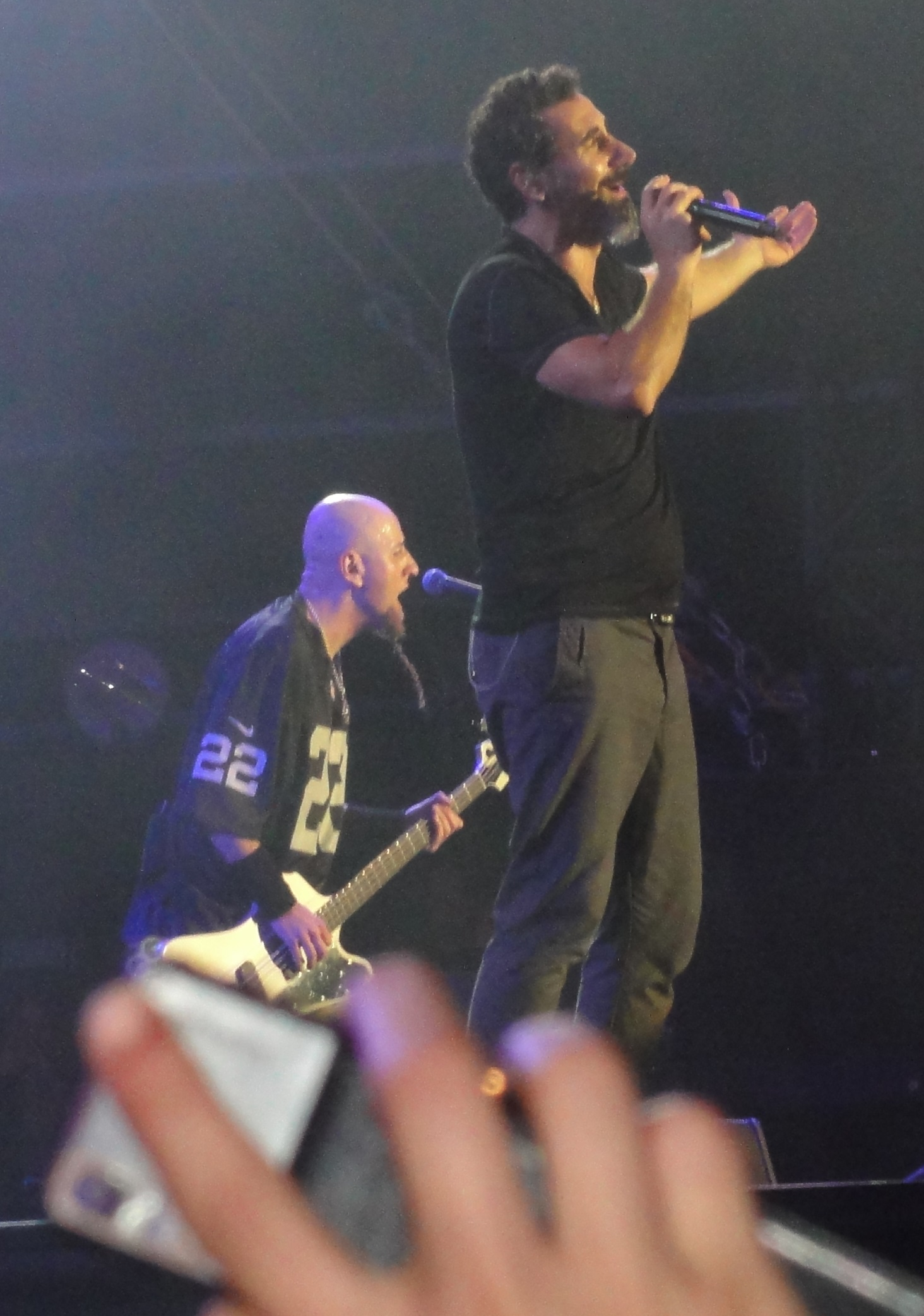
Odadjian (left) with Serj Tankian at a 2013 System of a Down show in Paris

While attending college (majoring in Psychology and minoring in Art) and working in a bank, Odadjian began managing Soil – the band Daron Malakian and Serj Tankian were a part of in 1993. Odadjian had met them in a recording studio, where he was rehearsing. The two members called upon him for assistance, and he became manager of the band. Odadjian says in an early interview that securing System's first local gig was a struggle:

"I was managing the band and we had no demo [tape], we had no money, but we wanted to play a show. I was working at the bank and between wire transfers, I would be calling the Roxy. 'Hey, can you give us a show, man? Eddie, give us a show.' He'd say, 'I need a demo tape, I can't just give you a show.' In five minutes, I'd call again. One day the Roxy just blew up and said, 'Fine! Go sell 75 tickets.' We sold 150."

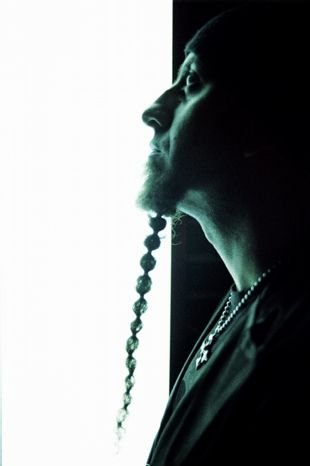
Odadjian's signature beard

In 1995, Odadjian became the band's permanent bassist. They named themselves System of a Down, after a poem written by bandmate Daron Malakian entitled "Victims of a Down." Odadjian was not keen on being labeled "Victims," and thought that the word "System" appealed to a much broader audience. The band has stated that they also wanted their CDs to be placed in stores alongside their favorite band, Slayer. It was at this time that Odadjian passed on his original managerial responsibilities to Velvet Hammer Music. Their first release was titled "Sugar." Soon after, drummer Andy Khachaturian joined the band but was replaced in 1997 by current drummer John Dolmayan due to a hand injury.

Odadjian plays bass in System of a Down, and also sings live backing vocals. His usual style of playing bass is with a pick, although he also has been seen fingerpicking during certain songs. Odadjian is credited with writing noted System of a Down songs, among them "Toxicity", "Sugar", "Jet Pilot", "Bounce," "Mind," "Dreaming," and "U-Fig." He has directed a majority of the band's music videos, and is responsible for stage design and lighting for each of their live performances.

On October 21, 2001, during a show in Grand Rapids, Michigan where System of a Down was headlining with Slipknot, Odadjian was assaulted, racially profiled and escorted out of the Van Andel Arena by security guards when he tried to enter the backstage. He filed a lawsuit in March 2003.

Physically Odadjian catches the eye through his braided beard, and spiked arm bracelet. Particularly Odadjian's beard quickly became a part of his signature look.

Commenting on System of a Down's reputation for biting, socially and politically charged lyrics, Odadjian has rejected the label of System of a Down as a "political band" in interviews. He has stated:

"We're not a political band. [...] We're a life band. In the world we live today, politics plays a major role in every one of our lives so of course, we're going to speak about politics but we also speak about sex, drugs, laughing, crying and sadness and death and life, including politics ... If you write a song about New Orleans because help didn't come to them from their own country for four days, you're going to speak about that. That's something strong. That's huge, that's big, that's happening now. But that doesn't make us a political band. That makes us a band that raises awareness about certain issues."

The band was on hiatus between 2006 and 2010, with group members focusing on outside projects. On November 23, 2010, System released an official statement declaring that they would play a number of European festivals in 2011, and they played a number of shows in western North America as well.

=== Reuniting for recent performances ===
On October 31, 2009, Odadjian hosted the event "Halloween" at The Roxy, in which he and fellow System bandmates Daron Malakian and John Dolmayan reunited to jam on stage and perform various songs together, including System of a Down's "Suite-Pee." The System of a Down trio also came together on November 20, 2009, and performed System songs together for a benefit honoring coma-stricken Chi Cheng of Deftones, with Chino Moreno of Deftones singing on lead vocals.

=== AcHoZeN ===
Odadjian started a side project in May 2006 named AcHoZeN. AcHoZeN is the musical alliance between Odadjian, Wu-Tang Clan founder RZA, Kinetic 9 (Beretta 9 from Killarmy), and Reverend William Burke from Chicago. Achozen's mantra is:

"Many shall come, only a few shall be Achozen."

The four principal members feel that their unique sound is not only spiritual in nature, but a new genre of "heavy hip hop," not "rap-metal." There are no heavy guitars on the album, but the sound is genre-blending. Most of the Achozen album was recorded at one of Odadjian's two studios and were also produced by him. The bulk of the beats were created by Odadjian (only one or two samples were used on the entire record) who also played live instruments throughout, including bass and sitar. RZA, who contributed his share of beats, Kinetic 9 and the Reverend William Burke sing a majority of the vocals and lyrics, which are, according to Odadjian, "some of the most innovative, poetic and righteous words and vocals that I've ever heard." Odadjian's vocals can also be heard on the AcHoZeN tracks "Deuces," "Salute/Sacrifice," and other songs on the album.

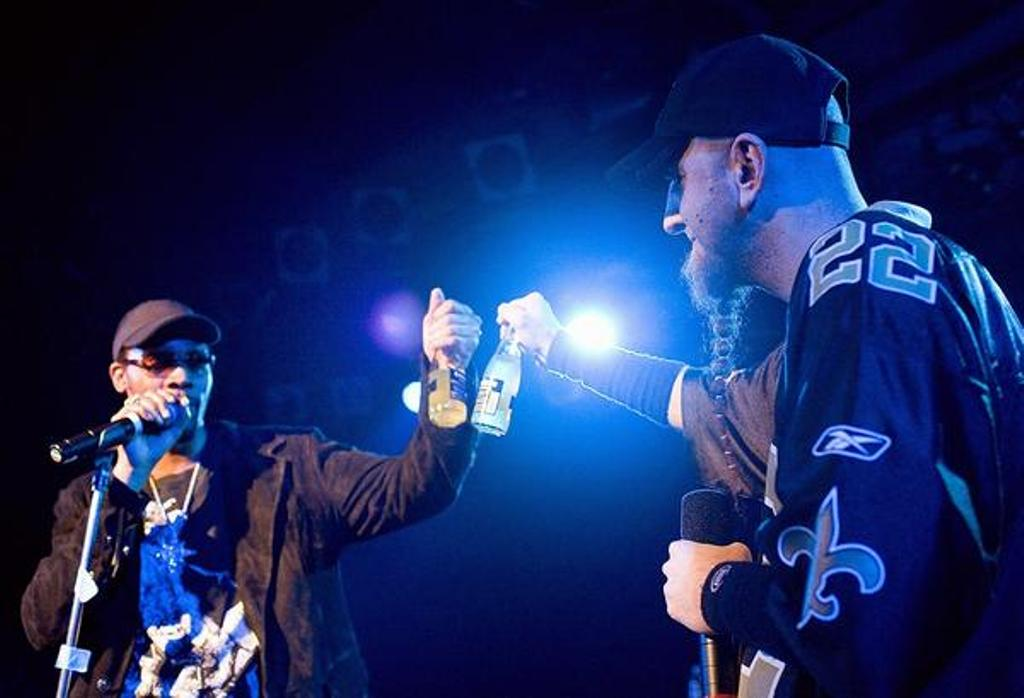
Shavo and The Rza performing live music from Achozen

Achozen's debut features an eclectic array of guest performers that includes Funk-master George Clinton, Red Hot Chili Peppers' guitarist John Frusciante, Wu-Tang affiliate Killah Priest, Wu-Tang founding member GZA, emcee Sick Jacken from Psycho Realm, and Angolan rapper Leggezin Fin.

The music of Achozen is described by one writer as a cosmic experience in hip-hop:

AcHoZeN is space hip hop, rap without a coast or even a planet. Instead, each song revolves around a solar system of feeling. The album explores and exorcises a spectrum of emotions, as each track delves into either pain, ecstasy, hate or hope. Utilizing sitar and violin, Shavo breaks the mold, playing live instruments across the album, as he constructs beats with a cosmic fluidity.

Odadjian has described AcHoZeN as "a musical revolution. It is not just a band, it's a way of thinking." RZA and Odadjian anticipate upcoming tours. Achozen also appears on the major motion picture, Babylon A.D., on which AcHoZeN song "Deuces" is heard blaring at the introduction of the film. AcHoZeN's first live show was at the Key Club in L.A on December 1, 2006.

On Friday, November 13, 2009, the second AcHoZeN track "Salute/Sacrifice" was released exclusively as a free download on Odadjian's online art district and networking site, urSESSION.com from the upcoming AcHoZeN debut album. The AcHoZeN album was anticipated to be released in mid-2010, but has yet to be released, due in part to Odadjian's commitments to System of a Down.

In 2015, the album was released as a compilation of 8 songs based on a boombox digital format. Potentially, more songs are to come as it has been stated that many more are mixed and recorded.

=== North Kingsley ===
Formed in 2019, Odadjian joined Ray Hawthorne and Saro Paparian's project as executive producer. After a few months, he joined as a member of the band and subsequently renamed the group North Kingsley.

Shavo spoke with Wall of Sound about the band's name origin revealing it came from the first street he lived on when he first moved to Los Angeles from Armenia back in 1979. Lineup: Odadjian, Ray Hawthorne, and Saro Paparian.

In 2020, Odadjian launched his new band, North Kingsley, featuring Saro Paparian and Ray Hawthorne. They released their debut single "Like That" on August 6. On December 4, 2020, the band released their second EP titled Vol.2.

=== Seven Hours After Violet ===
In 2024, Odadjian debuted the new band Seven Hours After Violet. Featuring Odadjian on bass, the band includes guitarist Michael Montoya, a.k.a. Morgoth Beatz and drummer Josh Johnson from the band Winds of Plague, guitarist-vocalist Alejandro Aranda, and lead vocalist Taylor Barber. The band made their live debut October 7, 2024, for SiriusXM, then performed their first festival appearance at the 2024 Mayhem Festival in San Bernardino, California. These appearances coincided with the release of the band's self-titled album on October 11, 2024.

=== DJing and other projects ===
In addition, Odadjian is a DJ in the LA area, taking part in such events as the "Rock/DJ Explosion" on March 2, 2001, at The Roxy in Hollywood, CA and collaborating with System of a Down bandmate Serj Tankian on Serart, the singer's collaboration album with multitalented Armenian musician Arto Tunçboyacıyan. Odadjian goes by the name DJ Tactics, and spins a wide spectrum of music spanning hip-hop, tech-house, classic rock, and metal.

Odadjian has played as part of the backing band of George Clinton (of Parliament/Funkadelic). In September 2008 he appeared (playing guitar instead of bass) in a live performance on The Tonight Show with Jay Leno with Clinton. Odadjian also appears on Clinton's 2008 album George Clinton and His Gangsters of Love, which features many guest musicians, including Odadjian's Achozen bandmate RZA, Red Hot Chili Peppers guitarist John Frusciante, and Carlos Santana.

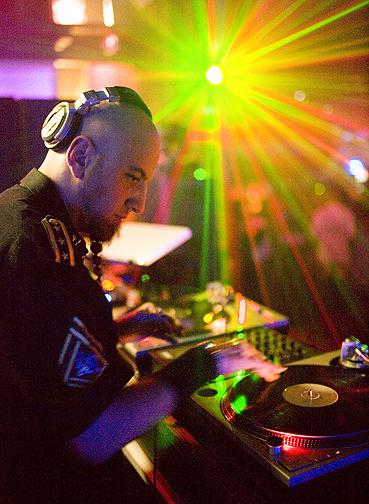
Odadjian spinning a set at a club in Hollywood, California

Odadjian was executive producer for Abloom, a side project of members of Onesidezero, Snot, and Soulfly. Odadjian is currently mentoring the band Chameleon Conductor record their debut album. Odadjian's younger brother Dave Odadjian plays bass in the band, alongside his cousin Harry Markarian, who plays the guitar.

== Other work ==
=== Directing and editing ===
Stating himself to be a "very visual person", Odadjian has directed and edited extensive music videos for System of a Down, including "Aerials" and "Toxicity". He states that the video concept for "Question!" came from one of his dreams.

Odadjian's directing style implements surreal atmospheric themes and integrates innovative methods in filming, inspired by Rod Serling (Twilight Zone). Odadjian's Serling-esque style is apparent in System of a Down music videos "Aerials," "Question," and Taproot's video -also directed by Odadjian – "Mine." On May 15, 2007, it was revealed that Odadjian would be directing the first video from Bad Brains's album Build a Nation. Odadjian makes an appearance at the end of the concert video with frontman H.R. The two are seen charismatically walking stage side, conversing and smoking together. Odadjian also directed the TV spot and launch trailer for the 2015 video game Mortal Kombat X, which features his band's signature song "Chop Suey!".

=== Scoring films ===
In 2007–2008, Odadjian and Rza teamed up with Hans Zimmer in scoring major motion-picture, summer blockbuster movie Babylon A.D., starring Vin Diesel. Along with the song "Deuces", Odadjian is credited with writing the songs "A Single Moment", "Foreshadow", "Blade Runner 0.8.", "Rollin DissgEyes", "Build Your Enemies", "Digital Slaps", and "Immaculate" for the scoring of the film.

=== Acting ===
Odadjian's involvement in the arts began at an early age, as he first appeared in the 1993 "Big Gun" video by AC/DC, standing alongside Arnold Schwarzenegger in the crowd sporting a backwards baseball cap and a white T-shirt, while Schwarzenegger catches a stick of dynamite. In an interview with Loudwire, he noted that him being prominently featured next to Schwarzenegger was unintentional, as the shot they used had the lights hit him more than any other extras in the crowd. He also made a cameo as Hansel's Posse member in the film Zoolander.

In 2006, Odadjian appeared in the documentary film Screamers, directed by Carla Garapedian. It follows Odadjian and the rest of System of a Down as they tour Europe and the US, pointing out the horrors of modern genocide that began in Armenia in 1915 up through Darfur today.

In 2026, Odadjian had a minor role as a villain in season 2 of Dexter: Resurrection.

=== Painting and artwork ===
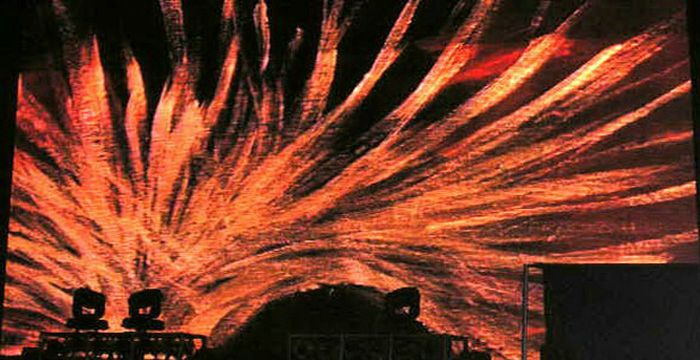
One of Odadjian's 26 abstract paintings that hung as a backdrop for Ozzfest 2006

Odadjian is an avid and passionate painter outside of music. His artwork has been featured in many System of a Down music videos and live shows – including an abstract piece highlighted in the "Hypnotize" video. Odadjian's painting style is abstract with loud, bright colors that bleed into each other. During Ozzfest of 2006, Odadjian created a 27-piece, abstract mosaic of paintings that was utilized as the stage backdrop for System's headlining at Ozzfest. (Stage design in System of a Down performances is also attributed to Odadjian). One critic wrote of the Ozzfest performance:

"Where most of the other bands on the bill stuck to the traditional metal imagery of skulls, blood and gore to enhance their stages, System went the other way, offering a series of abstract paintings that swished across an enormous video screen."

Each of Odadjian's paintings for the 2006 Ozzfest performance were hand-picked by Odadjian himself. Odadjian states that, in pairing each of his pieces/backdrops to songs, he aimed to coordinate each unique emotion of a specific song to the matching vibe of his paintings.

=== Philanthropy and activism ===
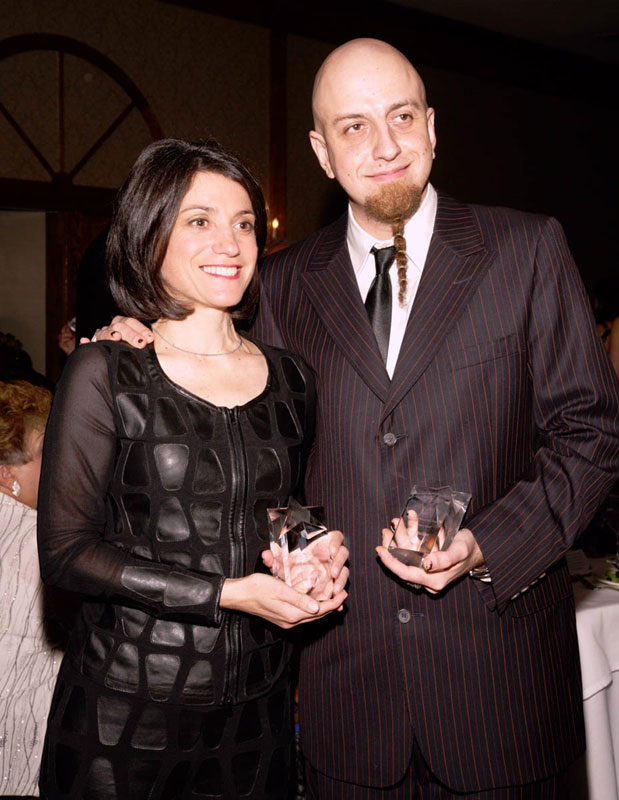
Odadjian accepting GenNext's "Community Hero Award"

Odadjian is a human rights activist known to take on an avid role in protesting against human atrocities, including, but not limited to, the recognition and prevention of worldwide genocide. He also actively participates in youth mentoring, and frequents charitable events that work to further research for cancer-stricken children. On February 27, 2009, Odadjian was presented with AGBU's GenNEXT "Community Hero Award," an award paying tribute to his outstanding work as a role model for young Armenian-Americans. Odadjian was nominated for the award by young kids in the community. During his acceptance speech, Odadjian highlighted the importance of being active in your local community:

"If anyone has a voice in today's society, they should use that voice righteously and benevolently."

Odadjian later discussed the personal value of his nomination by the kids of the community for the award:

"It was better than winning the Grammy. The Grammy is just industry; it's corporate. This is from the kids. This shows you that a difference happened. The best thing in the world is when you can get someone to notice a difference. It was an amazing feeling. I know where it came from. The kids nominated me, and it was the best."

== Personal life ==
Odadjian is married to Sonia Odadjian, with whom he has three children.

== Discography ==
System of a Down

- System of a Down (1998)
- Toxicity (2001)
- Steal This Album! (2002)
- Mezmerize (2005)
- Hypnotize (2005)

North Kingsley

- "Like That" single (single, 2020)
- Vol. 1 (EP, 2020)
- Vol. 2 (EP, 2020)

George Clinton

- George Clinton and His Gangsters of Love (2008)

Seven Hours After Violet

- Seven Hours After Violet (2024)

Other appearances

| Year | Artist | Song | Release |
|---|---|---|---|
Albums and soundtracks
| 2003 | Serart | "Narina" | Serart |
| 2007 | Wu-Tang Clan | "Unpredictable" | 8 Diagrams |
| 2007 | Wu-Tang Clan | "Starter" | 8 Diagrams |
| 2009 | Sunz of Man & Shavo Odadjian | "Dead Birds" | The RZA Presents: Afro Samurai Resurrection OST |
| 2009 | Brooklyn Zu | "If I had a Gun" | Chamber#9, Verse 32 |
| 2009 | Raekwon | "Gihad" | Only Built 4 Cuban Linx... Pt. II |
| 2009 | Raekwon | "Penitentiary" | Only Built 4 Cuban Linx... Pt. II |
| 2024 | Ice Nine Kills | "A Work of Art" | Terrifier 3 Soundtrack |

== Awards ==
- In 2002, System of a Down was nominated for a Grammy Award in Best Metal Performance for their song Chop Suey! but lost to Schism by Tool
- In 2003, System of a Down was nominated for a Grammy Award in Best Hard Rock Performance for Aerials but lost to All My Life by Foo Fighters
- In 2005, System of a Down won for Best Alternative Act in the Europe Music Awards
- In 2006, System of a Down won their first Grammy for Best Hard Rock Performance for BYOB
- In 2006, System of a Down won the "MTV Good Woodie Award" for their song Question!
- In 2006, System of a Down's song Toxicity was #14 on the VH1 Top 40 Metal Songs list
- In 2007, System of a Down was nominated for a Grammy Award in Best Hard Rock Performance for their song Lonely Day but lost to Woman by Wolfmother

== See also ==
- List of celebrities who own cannabis businesses
