= The Red Siren =

- Theatrical release poster
- Directed by: Olivier Megaton
- Screenplay by: Alain Berliner; Norman Spinrad; Olivier Megaton; Robert Conrath
- Based on: La Sirène rouge by Maurice G. Dantec
- Produced by: Simon Arnal; Carole Scotta
- Starring: Jean-Marc Barr; Asia Argento
- Cinematography: Denis Rouden
- Edited by: Stéphanie Gaurier; Yann Hervé
- Music by: Nicolas Bikialo
- Distributed by: Haut et Court; Studio Canal
- Release date: 22 August 2002
- Running time: 118 minutes
- Country: France
- Languages: French; English; Portuguese
- Budget: $6 million
- Box office: $1.4 million

The Red Siren (French: La sirène rouge) is a 2002 French crime thriller film based upon the novel by same name by Maurice G. Dantec. The film was directed by Olivier Megaton from a script by Olivier Megaton, Alain Berliner, Norman Spinrad, and Robert Conrath.

== Plot ==
Alice, a young girl (Alexandra Negrão), confesses to police detective Anita (Asia Argento) that her mother Eva (Frances Barber) is a dangerous murderer. Eva is also a very powerful and wealthy leader of a vast crime syndicate. She discovers that her daughter met with the police and tries to stop her. Unbeknownst at first to both Anita and Eva, Alice escapes from France and leaves for Portugal to reunite with her supposedly dead father. Eva's henchmen chase after her.

While escaping, Alice meets Hugo, a mercenary (Jean-Marc Barr), who then joins Alice as her protector on her journey to find her father. Anita travels after her, as well. After Eva's henchmen close in, Eva reappears to "reclaim" her daughter.

== Cast ==
- Jean-Marc Barr as Hugo (full name is "Hugo Cornelius Toorop" in the original novel)
- Asia Argento as Detective Anita Staro
- Frances Barber as Eva
- Alexandra Negrão as Alice
- Andrew Tiernan as Koesler
- Edouard Montoute as Oliveira
- Vernon Dobtcheff as Vitali
- Johan Leysen as Travis
- Jean-Christophe Bouvet as Lucas
- François Levantal as Sorvan
- Carlo Brandt as Vondt
