= Aerials (song) =

2002 single by System of a Down

Single by System of a Down

from the album Toxicity
- B-side: "Snowblind"
- Released: June 11, 2002
- Recorded: 2001
- Studio: Cello (Hollywood)
- Genre: Alternative metal
- Length: 3:55 (without hidden track); 6:11 (with hidden track)
- Label: American; Columbia
- Composer: Daron Malakian
- Lyricists: Serj Tankian; Daron Malakian
- Producers: Daron Malakian; Rick Rubin

System of a Down singles chronology
"Toxicity" (2002)	"Aerials" (2002)	"Innervision" (2002)

Music video
- "Aerials" on YouTube

"Aerials" is a song by American heavy metal band System of a Down. It was released in 2002 as the third single from their second album Toxicity (2001), which earned the band its second Grammy Award nomination for Best Hard Rock Performance at the 45th Annual Grammy Awards in 2003.

The song hit number one on both the Billboard's Alternative Songs and Mainstream Rock charts. It was System of a Down's first number-one hit. The song was played at the funeral of Keith Flint, frontman of the Prodigy.

"Aerials" is widely considered one of the band's best songs. Loudwire and Kerrang both ranked the song number three on their lists of the greatest System of a Down songs. In 2013, the staff of Loudwire included the song's main riff in their list of "the 10 Best Metal Riffs of the 2000s".

== Music video ==
The music video was directed by Shavo Odadjian and David Slade. The video features an alien-like, disfigured boy who is accompanied by people in various settings in which he is adored and pampered like a celebrity. The video was shot in Hollywood, Los Angeles.

== Track listing ==
CD single
No.	Title	Lyrics	Music	Length
1.	"Aerials"	Serj Tankian; Daron Malakian	Daron Malakian	3:57
2.	"Toxicity" (Live)	Serj Tankian	Shavo Odadjian; Daron Malakian	3:38
3.	"Sugar" (Live)	Serj Tankian	Shavo Odadjian; Daron Malakian	4:10
4.	"P.L.U.C.K." (Live)	Serj Tankian	Daron Malakian	4:09
5.	"Aerials" (Live Video/DVD Version)	Serj Tankian; Daron Malakian	Daron Malakian

Australian single
No.	Title	Lyrics	Music	Length
1.	"Aerials"	Serj Tankian; Daron Malakian	Daron Malakian	3:57
2.	"Toxicity" (Live Version)	Serj Tankian	Shavo Odadjian; Daron Malakian	3:38
3.	"P.L.U.C.K." (Live)	Serj Tankian	Daron Malakian	4:09

UK CD1
No.	Title	Lyrics	Music	Length
1.	"Aerials"	Serj Tankian; Daron Malakian	Daron Malakian	3:57
2.	"Toxicity" (Live)	Serj Tankian	Shavo Odadjian; Daron Malakian	3:38
3.	"P.L.U.C.K." (Live)	Serj Tankian	Daron Malakian	4:09
4.	"Aerials" (Video)	Serj Tankian; Daron Malakian	Daron Malakian

UK CD2
No.	Title	Lyrics	Music	Length
1.	"Aerials"	Serj Tankian; Daron Malakian	Daron Malakian	3:57
2.	"Streamline" (Alternate Version [from The Scorpion King soundtrack])	Serj Tankian	Serj Tankian; Daron Malakian	3:38
3.	"Sugar" (Live)	Serj Tankian	Shavo Odadjian; Daron Malakian	4:10

7" single
No.	Title	Lyrics	Music	Length
1.	"Aerials"	Serj Tankian; Daron Malakian	Daron Malakian	3:57
2.	"Snowblind" (Album Version)	Geezer Butler; Tony Iommi; Ozzy Osbourne; Bill Ward	Geezer Butler; Tony Iommi; Ozzy Osbourne; Bill Ward	4:40

== Personnel ==
Adapted from Qobuz.

System of a Down

- Serj Tankian – vocals, keyboards, co-production
- Daron Malakian – guitars, vocals, production
- Shavo Odadjian – bass
- John Dolmayan – drums

Additional personnel

- Rick Rubin – piano, production
- Greg Collins – engineering
- Darren Mora – assistant engineering
- Al Sanderson – assistant engineering
- Ryan McCormick – assistant engineering
- Jim Champagne – assistant engineering
- Andy Wallace – mixing engineering
- Rich Balmer – mixing engineering
- David Schiffman – recording engineering

== Charts ==
Chart performance for "Aerials"
Chart (2002–03)	Peak position
Australia (ARIA)	36
Canada (Billboard)	61
Germany (GfK)	80
Ireland (IRMA)	35
Scottish Singles Sales (Official Charts)	35
UK Singles (Official Charts)	34
UK Rock & Metal (Official Charts)	3
US Billboard Hot 100	55
US Alternative Airplay (Billboard)	1
US Mainstream Rock (Billboard)	1

== Certifications ==
Certifications and sales for "Aerials"
Region	Certification	Certified units/sales
Italy (FIMI)	Gold	50,000^{‡}
New Zealand (RMNZ)	2× Platinum	60,000^{‡}
Spain (Promusicae)	Gold	30,000^{‡}
United Kingdom (BPI)	Gold	400,000^{‡}
United States (RIAA)	4× Platinum	4,000,000^{‡}
^{‡} Sales+streaming figures based on certification alone.
