= La Sirène rouge =

1993 crime novel by Maurice G. Dantec

- 2001 edition
- Author: Maurice G. Dantec
- Language: French
- Publisher: Éditions Gallimard
- Publication date: 15 September 1993
- Publication place: France
- Pages: 478
- ISBN: 9782070493852

La Sirène rouge (The Red Siren) is a 1993 crime novel by the French writer Maurice G. Dantec. It tells the story of a girl who confesses to the police that her mother is a dangerous murderer, and is joined by a former soldier as she goes into hiding, searching for her supposedly dead father. The book was Dantec's debut novel.

The novel received the 1994 Trophée 813 for best French-language crime novel of the year. It was adapted into the 2002 film The Red Siren, directed by Olivier Megaton and starring Jean-Marc Barr.
