= Chop Suey! =

2001 song by System of a Down

- Standard retail artwork

Single by System of a Down

from the album Toxicity
- B-side: "Johnny"
- Released: August 13, 2001
- Studio: Cello (Hollywood)
- Genre: Nu metal; alternative metal
- Length: 3:30
- Label: American; Columbia
- Composer: Daron Malakian
- Lyricists: Serj Tankian; Daron Malakian
- Producers: Daron Malakian; Rick Rubin

System of a Down singles chronology
| "Spiders" (1999) | "Chop Suey!" (2001) | "Toxicity" (2002) |

Music video
- "Chop Suey!" on YouTube

"Chop Suey!" is a song by the American alternative metal band System of a Down. It was released on August 13, 2001, as the first single from their second album, Toxicity (2001). The single earned the band its first Grammy nomination in 2002 for Best Metal Performance at the 44th Annual Grammy Awards. "Chop Suey!" is often considered the band's signature song. Its music video has reached one billion views on YouTube and became their first song to be certified Diamond in the United States by the RIAA.

== Music and lyrics ==
The song's lyrics have been described as surrealist. In an interview, System of a Down's guitarist, Daron Malakian, explained, "The song is about how we are regarded differently depending on how we pass. Everyone deserves to die. Like, if I were now to die from drug abuse, they might say I deserved it because I abused dangerous drugs. Hence the line, 'I cry when angels deserve to die.'" The lyrics for the midsection ("Father into your hands I commend my spirit", from the sayings of Jesus on the cross) were randomly picked by the singer, Serj Tankian, from the producer Rick Rubin's book collection after Tankian was struggling for ideas.

Musically, the song is characterized by "sonic whiplash," containing what are described as "slash-and-burn verses and a surprisingly melodic chorus." Serj Tankian's vocal delivery has been said to have the "precision of a drill sergeant."

== Song title ==
The song was originally titled either "Suicide" (according to the bassist, Shavo Odadjian) or "Self-Righteous Suicide" (according to producer Rick Rubin), but the name was changed in response to real or anticipated pushback from Columbia Records. According to an online interview with Odadjian, the song title is a wordplay as he said: "Chop Suey" is "suicide" "chopped" in half. Most pressings of the album include an intro to the track where the singer, Serj Tankian, can be heard saying "we're rolling 'Suicide'" while the drummer, John Dolmayan, is counting the band in.

== Music video ==
The music video was the band's first collaboration with the director Marcos Siega, and is set in the parking lot of the Oak Tree Inn Motel, 5265 W Sunset Boulevard, in Los Angeles, hometown of the band. The members are performing the song on stage, surrounded by approximately 1,500 fans. Editing devices are used to create the effect of the band members "walking through" one another and teleporting on and off the stage. One scene briefly shows Tankian eating chop suey with some fans, the only reference to the title dish in either the song or the video. The video makes use of the SnorriCam technique, in which an actor will have a camera attached to them with a harness, making it appear as though the background is moving and the actor is stationary. In the middle of the video, the Armenian flag can be seen. The video reached one billion views on YouTube in November 2020.

== Reception ==
In 2012, Loudwire included the song in its list of "The Best Hard Rock Songs of the 21st Century", where it was ranked at number one. Loudwire and Kerrang! both named it as System of a Down's best song. In 2017, Annie Zaleski of Spin named it the fourth best nu metal track of all time. In March 2023, Rolling Stone ranked "Chop Suey!" at number 37 on their "100 Greatest Heavy Metal Songs of All Time" list.

== Controversy ==
"Chop Suey!" was the first single from Toxicity, an album that was at number one on the Billboard 200 chart during the week of the September 11 attacks. A controversy surrounding the single, especially the line "I don't think you trust in my self-righteous suicide", at the time led to Clear Channel Radio placing the song on a list of titles considered inappropriate following 9/11. Although it was never actually banned from the air, radio stations were advised against playing any of the songs on the list.

== Track listing ==
CD single
| No. | Title | Lyrics | Music | Length |
|---|---|---|---|---|
| 1. | "Chop Suey!" | Serj Tankian; Daron Malakian | Daron Malakian | 3:30 |
| 2. | "Johnny" | Tankian | Tankian | 2:08 |
| 3. | "Sugar" (Live) | Tankian | Shavo Odadjian; Malakian | 2:23 |
| 4. | "War?" (Live) | Tankian | Malakian | 2:47 |

UK CD1 • Australian single
| No. | Title | Lyrics | Music | Length |
|---|---|---|---|---|
| 1. | "Chop Suey!" | Tankian; Malakian | Malakian | 3:30 |
| 2. | "Johnny" | Tankian | Tankian | 2:08 |
| 3. | "Know" (Live) | Tankian | Odadjian; Malakian; Tankian | 3:04 |

UK CD2
| No. | Title | Lyrics | Music | Length |
|---|---|---|---|---|
| 1. | "Chop Suey!" | Tankian; Malakian | Malakian | 3:31 |
| 2. | "Sugar" (Live) | Tankian | Odadjian; Malakian | 2:27 |
| 3. | "War?" (Live) | Tankian | Malakian | 2:47 |
| 4. | "Chop Suey!" (Video) | Tankian; Malakian | Malakian | 3:27 |

7" single
| No. | Title | Lyrics | Music | Length |
|---|---|---|---|---|
| 1. | "Chop Suey!" | Tankian; Malakian | Malakian | 3:30 |
| 2. | "Johnny" | Tankian | Tankian | 2:08 |

== Commercial performance ==
"Chop Suey!" was a moderate success on the charts. In Australia, after hitting No. 3 on the Triple J Hottest 100 of 2001, with virtually no airplay on commercial radio, it debuted and peaked at No. 14 in February 2002. It is System of a Down's highest-charting single in Australia. In the United States, the song peaked at No. 76, making it the band's lowest peaking song on the Billboard Hot 100 due to the fact it was taken off the radio for its political lyrics. On the Modern Rock Tracks chart, "Chop Suey!" peaked at No. 7, becoming the band's first top ten single. On the UK Singles Chart, it debuted and peaked at No. 17. In August 2026, "Chop Suey!" was certified Diamond by RIAA in celebration of Toxicity's 25th anniversary.

== Charts ==
=== Weekly charts ===
Weekly chart performance for "Chop Suey!"
| Chart (2001–2002) | Peak position |
|---|---|
| Australia (ARIA) | 14 |
| Belgium (Ultratop 50 Flanders) | 18 |
| Canada (Billboard) | 21 |
| Ireland (IRMA) | 46 |
| Netherlands (Dutch Top 40) | 22 |
| Netherlands (Single Top 100) | 25 |
| Scottish Singles Sales (Official Charts) | 15 |
| UK Singles (Official Charts) | 17 |
| UK Rock & Metal (Official Charts) | 3 |
| US Billboard Hot 100 | 76 |
| US Alternative Airplay (Billboard) | 7 |
| US Mainstream Rock (Billboard) | 12 |

2025 weekly chart performance for "Chop Suey!"
| Chart (2025) | Peak position |
|---|---|
| Brazil Hot 100 (Billboard) | 84 |
| Portugal (AFP) | 181 |

=== Year-end charts ===
2001 year-end chart performance for "Chop Suey!"
| Chart (2001) | Position |
|---|---|
| Canada (Billboard) | 183 |

2002 year-end chart performance for "Chop Suey!"
| Chart (2002) | Position |
|---|---|
| Canada (Billboard) | 165 |

=== Decade-end charts ===
20s Decade-end chart performance
| Chart (2025–2026) | Position |
|---|---|
| Russia Streaming (TopHit) | 180 |

== Certifications ==
Certifications for "Chop Suey!"
| Region | Certification | Certified units/sales |
|---|---|---|
| Australia (ARIA) | Gold | 35,000^{^} |
| Denmark (IFPI Danmark) | Platinum | 90,000^{‡} |
| Germany (BVMI) | Platinum | 600,000^{‡} |
| Italy (FIMI) | Platinum | 50,000^{‡} |
| New Zealand (RMNZ) | 5× Platinum | 150,000^{‡} |
| Portugal (AFP) | 4× Platinum | 40,000^{‡} |
| Spain (Promusicae) | Platinum | 60,000^{‡} |
| United Kingdom (BPI) | 2× Platinum | 1,200,000^{‡} |
| United States (RIAA) | Diamond | 10,000,000^{‡} |
Ringtone
| United States (RIAA) Mastertone | Gold | 500,000^{*} |
^{*} Sales figures based on certification alone.^{^} Shipments figures based on certification alone.^{‡} Sales+streaming figures based on certification alone.

== Lil Uzi Vert version ==
On June 30, 2023, American rapper and singer Lil Uzi Vert released a cover of "Chop Suey!", titled "CS", as a part of their third studio album, Pink Tape.

Serj Tankian posted on Facebook: "Covers are always the biggest compliment to artists and songwriters." The bassist, Shavo Odadjian, also reacted positively to the cover on Instagram.
