= Sylvia Massy =

American record producer

- Born: Sylvia Lenore Massy; Flint, Michigan, U.S.
- Occupations: Audio engineer; record producer; author
- Years active: 1985–present
- Website: sylviamassy.com

Sylvia Lenore Massy is a Grammy winning American record producer, mixer, and engineer. Undertow (1993), a full-length triple platinum-selling debut for alternative metal band Tool from Los Angeles, was her major breakthrough. In addition she has worked with System of a Down, Johnny Cash, Red Hot Chili Peppers, and South Cry, a Brazilian rock band.

== History ==
Massy attended Chico State University, where she worked as a radio DJ at campus station KCSC and became interested in recording equipment and production techniques while also performing in local bands.

Massy's first project was in the mid-1980s as producer, engineer, and mixer for a compilation album titled Rat Music for Rat People, Vol. 3 on the CD Presents label. Acts featured included Adolescents, Raw Power, Doggy Style and Mojo Nixon. Next she produced the punk band Verbal Abuse for Boner Records, was an engineer on two projects for metal band Exodus, and co-produced the Sea Hags independent album with a young Kirk Hammett, a guitarist who had just finished recording the Master of Puppets album with thrash metal group Metallica. She also produced "Television, Drug of a Nation" by the Beatnigs, the former band of Michael Franti from the Disposable Heroes of Hiphoprisy's.

=== From Green Jellö to Tool ===
In the late 1980s, Massy moved from San Francisco to Los Angeles and worked at Tower Records on Sunset Boulevard. At Tower she met the members of Green Jellö (later known as Green Jellÿ), a band from Buffalo, New York and recorded their debut album. After becoming a staff engineer at Larrabee Sound in West Hollywood, California, Massy was hired by Zoo Records/BMG to produce Green Jellö's major label debut album featuring members of a new Los Angeles group called Tool. On Green Jellö's Cereal Killer album, Tool's Maynard James Keenan sings on "Three Little Pigs", and Tool's drummer Danny Carey plays on the album. A relationship was begun between Massy and Tool leading to two recordings, Opiate and Undertow.

=== Los Angeles and Larrabee Sound ===
In Los Angeles, Massy was an engineer, producer, or mixer on recordings from artists including Aerosmith, Babyface, Big Daddy Kane, Bobby Brown, Prince, Julio Iglesias, Seal, Skunk Anansie, Paula Abdul, Ryuichi Sakamoto and others. She worked with manager Gary Kurfirst on Irish rock band Cyclefly for Kurfirst's Radioactive Records. At Larrabee Sound, Sylvia connected with producer Rick Rubin and worked with him on several projects over seven years.

=== Sound City ===
From 1994 until 2001, Massy's vintage Neve 8038 console and other specialized recording equipment occupied Studio B at Sound City Studios in Van Nuys, California. Besides Massy's work at Sound City, several other successful projects were recorded on her equipment during those years including albums by Sheryl Crow, Queens of the Stone Age, Black Rebel Motorcycle Club, the Smashing Pumpkins, the Black Crowes, and Lenny Kravitz. Massy's equipment is visible in many scenes of Dave Grohl's film Sound City.

=== Rubin and beyond ===
Massy engineered and mixed several projects for producer Rick Rubin on his label American Recordings, including Johnny Cash's album Unchained, which won a Grammy award for Best Country Album in 1997. With Rubin, she recorded Tom Petty and the Heartbreakers, Slayer, Donovan, Geto Boys, the Black Crowes, Danzig, and System of a Down's debut album. In the '90s, Massy produced material for Red Hot Chili Peppers, Sevendust, and Powerman 5000, which featured guest appearances from Rob Zombie and actor Malachi Throne and also newcomer Pauley Perrette. In 1997 Massy mixed the Beastie Boys' "Tibetan Freedom Concert" on Randall’s Island in Manhattan, New York with Adam Yauch and producer Pat McCarthy.

=== RadioStar Studios and international acclaim ===
Beginning in 2001, Massy owned and operated RadioStar Studios in the Weed Palace Theater until it closed in 2012. She acquired the theater in 2001 in Weed, California, and operated it as a recording studio for 11 years with notable clients: Sublime, Dishwalla, Swirl 360, Econoline Crush, Cog, Spiderbait, Norma Jean, Built To Spill, and From First To Last (featuring Sonny Moore of Skrillex.) Several international hits have emerged from RadioStar Studios in conjunction with Massy. Notable achievements include Spiderbait's "Black Betty", which reached No. 1 on the ARIA Singles Chart in Australia in 2004, and Cog's debut album The New Normal, which received a nomination into Triple J's "Album of the Year" J Award in 2005. Additionally, Seigmen's "Metropolis" achieved No. 4 on Norway's sales charts, while Klepht was recognized as the "Best Portuguese Act" by MTV Europe. Econoline Crush earned a Canadian Juno nomination and their 1997 album The Devil You Know was Certified Platinum. Furthermore, Animal Alpha's self-titled EP attained Certified Gold status in Norway in 2005.

=== Artwork, writing and music festivals ===
In the 2000s, she wrote a regular column in Mix Magazine called "Gear Stories" contrasting vintage recording equipment with modern equivalents. She wrote an essay about Thomas Edison's contribution to the recording industry which was included in the official Grammy Awards Program. In 2011, Massy co-founded the 4&20 Blackbird Music Festival which operated for two years in downtown Weed, California. The festival drew approximately 7000 people and featured 250 musical acts during its run.

In January 2015, Massy began to write a book called Recording Unhinged for Hal Leonard Publishing. The book was published in March 2016. Interviews and contributors for the book include Hans Zimmer, Geoff Emerick, Bob Ezrin, Bruce Swedien, Michael Franti, Bob Clearmountain, Al Schmitt, Elliot Scheiner, Linda Perry, Ross Robinson, Matt Wallace, Ross Hogarth, Shelly Yakus, Paul Wolff. Massy also illustrated the book. The cover of the March 2016 issue of Electronic Musician features Massy's illustration of a dinosaur and a robot battling.

=== As an educator ===
In 2015 and 2018, Massy was a visiting professor at Berklee College of Music in Boston. In 2018 she taught a workshop at the Abbey Road Institute in London. In 2016 she lectured at SAE Institute's audio engineering schools in London and Munich, Germany. She has presented periodic recording workshops in Dresden at Castle Rohrsdorf and at Mix with the Masters in Les Studios de la Fabrique in Saint-Rémy-de-Provence in the south of France. In 2017 Massy conducted a workshop and lecture at the Conservatory of Recording Arts and Sciences in Gilbert, Arizona and a workshop at Tecnólogico de Monterrey in Mexico City for several hundred students. She has conducted workshops in Sardinia, Oslo, Gdansk, Poland; and Rome. In 2017, Massy and co-author Chris Johnson began a collaboration for a professional recording course at Berklee based on their book, Recording Unhinged.

In 2019, Massy toured and conducted workshops for Abbey Road Institute locations in Amsterdam, Berlin, Paris, and London.

=== Recent ===
Massy lives in Ashland, Oregon and works in a private studio. She continues to work as an independent producer, educator, and music promoter. She has appeared on an episode of Pensado's Place, an industry video program with producer/mixer Dave Pensado and was nominated for "The Big Award" at the Pensado Awards in 2014. Massy is a member of NARAS and served on the P&E Wing Steering Committee and Advisory Boards. In 2009, she traveled to Washington, D.C. to lobby for musicians' performance rights and is involved with musician, producer, and educational advocacy work on behalf of NARAS. In February 2016 Massy won the Music Producers Guild's "MPG Inspiration Award" at the MPG Awards in London. The award was presented by John Leckie.

In 2015 Massy mixed for Cage the Elephant and Soilwork. In late 2015 and early 2016 she oversaw the production of Avatar's album Feathers & Flesh. In 2016 she recorded Seattle all-woman noise band Thunderpussy in an abandoned nuclear power plant's cooling tower for the song "Torpedo Love". She recorded singer-songwriter Sarah Brendel in the underground venue at the Merkers Show Mine, a retired salt mine in Merkers, Germany. In early 2017 she produced and engineered the Melvins at the Village studio in Santa Monica, California while being filmed by Mix with the Masters. She produced albums by Econoline Crush, Far From Alaska and Dishwalla, and was hired to re-work the recordings of Grey Daze, a side project by Linkin Park's frontman Chester Bennington. In early 2018, Massy produced the MTV Unplugged television broadcast (and then album release) of Molotov, a Mexican rock band in Mexico City. In the summer of 2018 she gained access to the abandoned London Underground station at Aldwych to record British band God Damn on the subway platform.

In 2019 Massy produced and mixed the follow-up to Life of Agony's River Runs Red album, named The Sound of Scars. Tracks were recorded at Studio Divine in Ashland, Oregon. Later in 2019 Massy mixed a solo album for Taylor Hawkins (drummer for Foo Fighters). The album features performances by Dave Grohl (Foo Fighters, Nirvana), Joe Walsh (Eagles), Chrissie Hynde (Pretenders), LeAnn Rimes, Nancy Wilson (Heart), Perry Farrell (Jane's Addiction, Porno For Pyros), Roger Taylor (Queen), Chris Chaney (Porno For Pyros) and Duff McKagan (Guns N' Roses).

== Discography ==
Massy has worked on the following projects:

Year	Artist	Project	Title	Producer	Engineer	Mix	Note
2023	Snailbones	Single	Leave the Scene			Yes	
2019	Taylor Hawkins	LP	Get The Money			Yes	Republic Records
2019	Life Of Agony	LP	The Sound Of Scars	Yes	Yes	Yes	Napalm
2018	God Damn	LP	God Damn	Yes	Yes	Yes	One Little Indian label
2018	Molotov	LP/Video	El Desconecte	Yes			MTV Unplugged performance
2017	Turbonegro	LP	Rock & Roll Machine			Yes	
2017	Far from Alaska	LP	Unlikely	Yes	Yes	Yes	
2017	Melvins	Single	"From the Heart / Not a Leech"	Yes	Yes	Yes	
2017	Dishwalla	LP	Juniper Road		Yes		Co-producer
2016	Red Sun Rising	Single	"Uninvited" (Morissette)	Yes	Yes	Yes	
2016	Thunderpussy	LP		Yes	Yes		
2016	Avatar	LP	Feathers & Flesh	Yes	Yes		
2016	Justin Kawashima	EP				Yes	
2015	Die So Fluid	Single				Yes	
2014	Pink Grenade with Johnny Depp	LP	Fear of a Pink Planet		Yes	Yes	
2014	Cage the Elephant	Single				Yes	
2014	Soilwork	Single				Yes	
2011	Dead Sara	Singles		Yes	Yes	Yes	
2011	Molotov Jive	Album	Storm	Yes			
2011	Showbread	Album	Who Can Know It?	Yes			
2011	Air Dubai	EP	Day Escape	Yes			
2011	One-Eyed Doll	Album	Dirty	Yes			
2011	Lillian Axe	Album	XI: The Days Before Tomorrow			Yes	
2010	The Cliks	Album	Dirty King	Yes	Yes	Yes	
2010	Kaura	Album	That Which Defines Us			Yes	
2010	Distortion Mirrors	EP	Circle of Wolves	Yes			
2010	South Cry	Album	Blue Moon	Yes			
2010	Sublime with Rome	EP	Yours Truly	Yes	Yes	Yes	
2010	Shrub	Album	Senorita	Yes	Yes	Yes	
2010	The Crash	Album		Yes			
2010	81db	Album	Impressions	Yes			
2009	Lucky Lew	Album	Beauty in Aggression	Yes	Yes	Yes	
2009	The Grand	Single				Yes	
2009	Showbread	LP	The Fear of God	Yes			
2009	The Dollyrots	LP	A Little Messed Up				Co-mixer
2009	Seven Years Past	LP	24 Days in May	Yes			
2008	Lax'n'Busto	LP	Objectiu: La lluna	Yes	Yes	Yes	
2008	Godhead	Single from LP	At the Edge of the World			Yes	
2008	Belladonna	LP	The Noir Album	Yes			
2008	The Cliks	LP	Dirty King	Yes	Yes	Yes	
2008	Johnny Cash	Songs from	The Legend of Johnny Cash		Yes	Yes	Certified platinum
2008	Econoline Crush	LP	Ignite	Yes	Yes	Yes	
2007	COG	LP	Sharing Space	Yes	Yes	Yes	
2007	Mankind Is Obsolete	LP	Trapped Inside	Yes			
2007	Savoy	LP	Savoy Songbook Vol. 1			Yes	
2006	Mt. Helium	LP	Faces			Yes	
2006	Annie Mac	LP	Ignition	Yes			
2006	Apex Theory	EP	Lightpost			Yes	
2006	Showbread	LP	Age of Reptiles	Yes			
2006	Silver Griffin	LP	Here in the Night	Yes	Yes	Yes	
2006	Five Star Iris	LP	Five Star Iris	Yes		Yes	
2006	Major Parkinson	LP	Major Parkinson	Yes	Yes	Yes	
2006	P.T.P.	LP	Drop of Ink	Yes			
2006	Tripdavon	LP	Enlightened Operative	Yes			
2006	Atomic	LP		Yes			
2006	Furia	LP		Yes	Yes	Yes	
2005	Animal Alpha	LP	Pheremones	Yes	Yes	Yes	Certified gold
2005	Staple	LP	Of Truth and Reconciliation	Yes	Yes	Yes	
2005	Re:Ignition	LP	True Love	Yes	Yes	Yes	
2005	Scott Huckabay	LP	Secret Portal				Co-producer
2004	Spiderbait	LP	Tonight Alright	Yes	Yes	Yes	Certified platinum
2004	Showbread	LP	No Sir, Nihilism Is Not Practical	Yes	Yes	Yes	
2004	Dishwalla	LP		Yes	Yes	Yes	
2004	COG	LP	The New Normal	Yes	Yes	Yes	
2004	Mnemonic	LP					Co-producer
2004	Bigbang	LP	Bigbang			Yes	
2003	Zed	LP	This Little Empire	Yes	Yes	Yes	
2003	Sophie B. Hawkins	Singles	Wilderness			Yes	
2003	Fighting Jacks	LP	The Dying Art of Life	Yes	Yes	Yes	
2003	Seven Mary Three	Singles	Dis/Location	Yes	Yes	Yes	
2002	Acroma	LP	Orbitals	Yes	Yes	Yes	
2002	Lustra	EP	Left for Dead	Yes	Yes		
2001	Lollipop Lust Kill	LP (debut)	My So Called Knife	Yes			
2000	System of a Down	Single	"Störagéd" – Heavy Metal 2000		Yes		
2000	Loudermilk	LP	The Red Record		Yes		
2000	Powerman 5000	Single	"Get On" – Scream 3	Yes			
2000	Sevendust	Single	"Fall" – Scream 3	Yes	Yes	Yes	
2000	System of a Down	Single	"Spiders" – Scream 3		Yes		
2000	Powerman 5000	Single	"Nobody's Real" – End of Days	Yes			
2000	Shivaree	LP	I Oughtta Give You a Shot in the Head for Making Me Live in This Dump			Yes	
1999	Second Coming	Single				Yes	
1999	The Deadlights	LP (debut)	The Deadlights	Yes	Yes	Yes	
1999	System of a Down	Single	"Marmalade"		Yes		
1998	Powerman 5000	LP	Tonight the Stars Revolt!	Yes	Yes		Certified platinum
1998	Cyclefly	LP	Generation Sap	Yes	Yes	Yes	
1998	Melissa Etheridge	Singles				Yes	
1998	Dig	Singles	Life Like			Yes	
1998	Firewater	LP	The Ponzi Scheme			Yes	
1998	System of a Down	LP	System of a Down		Yes		Certified gold
1998	The Smashing Pumpkins	Single	Machina II/The Friends & Enemies of Modern Music		Yes		
1998	Kula Shaker	Single	K		Yes	Yes	
1998	Reef	LP	Rides		Yes		
1998	Cowboy Mouth	Singles	Mercyland			Yes	
1997	Kula Shaker	Remix from K	"Hush"			Yes	
1997	The Outsiders	LP	Viper Room		Yes		
1997	Porno for Pyros	LP	Tibetan Freedom Concert		Yes	Yes	Co-producer
1997	Alanis Morissette	LP	Tibetan Freedom Concert		Yes	Yes	Co-producer
1997	Foo Fighters	LP	Tibetan Freedom Concert		Yes	Yes	Co-producer
1997	Blur	LP	Tibetan Freedom Concert		Yes	Yes	Co-producer
1997	Bjork	LP	Tibetan Freedom Concert		Yes	Yes	Co-producer
1997	Lee Perry	LP	Tibetan Freedom Concert		Yes	Yes	Co-producer
1997	Patti Smith	LP	Tibetan Freedom Concert		Yes	Yes	Co-producer
1997	Beck	LP	Tibetan Freedom Concert		Yes	Yes	Co-producer
1997	Rage Against the Machine	LP	Tibetan Freedom Concert		Yes	Yes	Co-producer
1997	The Smashing Pumpkins	LP	Tibetan Freedom Concert		Yes	Yes	Co-producer
1997	Fugees	LP	Tibetan Freedom Concert		Yes	Yes	Co-producer
1997	Cibo Matto	LP	Tibetan Freedom Concert		Yes	Yes	Co-producer
1997	Pavement	LP	Tibetan Freedom Concert		Yes	Yes	Co-producer
1997	Sonic Youth	LP	Tibetan Freedom Concert		Yes	Yes	Co-producer
1997	Econoline Crush	LP	The Devil You Know	Yes	Yes	Yes	Certified platinum
1997	Reef	Single	"Don't You Like It" – Glow			Yes	
1997	Luscious Jackson	Remix	"Naked Eye"			Yes	
1997	Flea / Jewel	Singles					Co-producer
1997	Glueleg	LP	Clodhopper	Yes	Yes	Yes	
1997	Deftones	Single	"Can't Even Breathe" – Escape from L.A. Soundtrack			Yes	
1997	Mary Beats Jane	LP	Locust			Yes	
1996	Red Hot Chili Peppers	Alt. mixes	One Hot Minute			Yes	
1996	Red Hot Chili Peppers	Single	"Love Rollercoaster" – Beavis and Butt-Head Do America Soundtrack	Yes	Yes	Yes	Certified gold
1996	Johnny Cash	LP	Unchained		Yes	Yes	
1996	R.E.M.		Road Movie			Yes	
1996	Tom Petty and the Heartbreakers		"Climb That Hill" – She's the One		Yes	Yes	
1996	Donovan	LP	"Eldorado" – Surtras			Yes	
1996	Love and Rockets	LP	Sweet F.A.	Yes	Yes		
1996	Pigmy Love Circus	Single	"Drug Run to Fontana"			Yes	
1996	Horsehead	LP	Onism	Yes	Yes	Yes	
1996	Oingo Boingo	LP	Farewell			Yes	
1996	Bigelf	LP	Closer to Doom	Yes			
1995	Skunk Anansie	LP	Paranoid and Sunburnt	Yes	Yes		Certified gold
1995	Machines of Loving Grace	LP	Gilt	Yes	Yes	Yes	
1995	Seigmen	LP	Metropolis	Yes	Yes	Yes	Certified gold
1995	Brutal Juice	LP	Mutilation Makes Identification Difficult	Yes	Yes	Yes	
1995	Slayer	LP	Divine Intervention		Yes		
1994	Luscious Jackson	Single	"Deep Shag" – Natural Ingredients			Yes	
1994	Babes in Toyland	Single	"Say What You Want" – S.F.W	Yes	Yes	Yes	
1994	Seigmen	LP	Total	Yes	Yes	Yes	
1993	Tool	LP	Undertow	Yes	Yes		Certified multi-platinum
1993	Greta	LP	No Biting	Yes	Yes	Yes	
1992	Green Jellö	LP	Cereal Killer	Yes	Yes	Yes	Certified gold
1992	Tool	EP	Opiate	Yes	Yes	Yes	Certified platinum
1992	Patti LaBelle	Single					Assistant engineer
1992	Ingrid Chavez	Single	"Crystal City Cry"			Yes	
1992	Carmen Elektra	Single				Yes	
1992	Louie Louie	Single					Assistant engineer
1991	Prince	Remix	"Cream"				Assistant engineer
1991	Prince	LP	Diamonds and Pearls		Yes		Assistant engineer Certified multi-platinum
1991	Fishbone	LP	The Reality of My Surroundings				Assistant engineer
1991	Kate Bush	Single					Assistant engineer
1991	George Clinton	Single					Assistant engineer
1991	Green Jellö	LP (vinyl)	Cereal Killer	Yes	Yes	Yes	
1991	Elton John	Single	"Nobody's…. "				Assistant engineer
1991	Tom Jones	LP					Assistant engineer
1991	Jefferson Starship	LP					Assistant engineer
1991	Paul Schaffer Band	Single					Assistant engineer
1991	Enuff Z'Nuff	LP	Strength				Assistant engineer
1991	Sheena Easton	Single					Assistant engineer
1991	Kylie Minogue	Single					Assistant engineer
1991	Paula Abdul	LP	Spellbound		Yes		Assistant engineer
1991	Ziggy Marley	Live				Yes	
1991	Eric Burdon	LP					Assistant engineer
1990	Prince		"New Power Generation"		Yes		Assistant engineer
1990	Prince	LP	Graffiti Bridge				
1990	Junkyard	LP			Yes	Yes	
1990	Wendy & Lisa	Single	"Waterfall" – Wendy and Lisa				Assistant engineer
1990	Mavis Staples	Single					Assistant engineer
1990	Rosie Gaines	Single					Assistant engineer
1990	Paula Abdul	Single					Assistant engineer
1990	Aerosmith	Remix	"The Other Side"		Yes		Co-mixer
1990	Seal	Single					Assistant engineer
1990	Babyface	Single					Assistant engineer
1990	Orchestral Manoeuvres in the Dark	LP					Assistant engineer
1989	Big Daddy Kane	Single	"It's a Big Daddy Thing" – It's a Big Daddy Thing				Assistant engineer
1990	Young MC	LP	Brainstorm				Assistant engineer
1990	Bobby Brown	Single	"The Freestyle Mega-Mix"				Assistant engineer
1990	Queen	LP					Assistant engineer
1990	New Edition	Single					Assistant engineer
1990	Teddy Riley	Single					Assistant engineer
1990	Spandau Ballet	LP	Heart Like a Sky				Assistant engineer
1990	BeBe & CeCe Winans (featuring MC Hammer)	Single	"The Blood" – Different Lifestyles		Yes		
1990	Danzig	LP	Danzig II: Lucifuge				Assistant engineer
1990	Geto Boys	LP					Assistant engineer
1990	The Time	Remix	"Chocolate" (remix)		Yes		
1990	Apollo Smile	LP			Yes		
1990	Black Crowes	LP	Shake Your Moneymaker				Assistant engineer
1990	The Jacksons	LP	2300 Jackson Street				Assistant engineer
1990	Ryuichi Sakamoto	LP	Soundtrack to Black Rain				Assistant engineer
1989	Green Jellö	LP	Triple Live Möther Gööse at Budokan	Yes			
1989	The Big F	LP (debut)	The Big F				Assistant engineer
1989	Trouble	LP					Assistant engineer
1989	Julio Iglesias	LP	Starry Night				Assistant engineer
1989	Jermaine Jackson	LP					Assistant engineer
1989	Barbra Streisand	LP	The Broadway Album				Assistant engineer
1987	Exodus	LP	Pleasures of the Flesh		Yes		
1987	Joe Satriani	LP	Surfing with the Alien				Assistant engineer
1987	Femme Fatale	Single	"I Need a Date"	Yes			
1987	Adolescents		"All Day and All of the Night" (Ray Davies): Rat Music for Rat People Vol. III	Yes	Yes	Yes	
1987	Mojo Nixon / Skid Roper		"I Ain't Gonna Piss in No Jar" (Mojo Nixon): Rat Music for Rat People Vol. III	Yes	Yes	Yes	
1987	Raw Power		"We Shall Overcome" (traditional): Rat Music for Rat People Vol. III	Yes	Yes	Yes	
1987	Doggy Style		"Janitor Man" (Gary Hobish): Rat Music for Rat People Vol. III	Yes	Yes	Yes	
1986	Sea Hags	LP (debut)	Sea Hags		Yes	Yes	Co-producer
1986	The Beatnigs	Single	"Television"	Yes	Yes	Yes	
1986	Tuxedomoon	Live LP				Yes	
1985	Verbal Abuse	LP	Rocks Your Liver	Yes	Yes	Yes	
1984	New Riders of the Purple Sage	Single					Assistant engineer
1984	Bobby Hutcherson	LP	Color Schemes				Assistant engineer
