= Baboon (disambiguation) =

A baboon is an Old World monkey of the genus Papio.

Baboon may also refer to:

- The local name in Belize for the howler monkey
- The baboon spider, an Old World Tarantula
- Baboon (band), a rock and roll band from Denton, Texas
  - Baboon (album), their self-titled 2006 album
- Serbian medieval term for heretics
- Baboon (short story collection), a 2006 short story collection by Danish author Naja Marie Aidt
- I.R. Baboon, a character from the animated series I Am Weasel
