= South Cry =

Brazilian rock band

- Origin: Cordeiro, Rio de Janeiro (state), Brazil
- Genres: Alternative rock, hard rock
- Years active: 2000–present
- Label: Big Sky Rock (current)
- Members: Daltri Barros (vocals/guitar), Guill Erthall (lead guitar), Patrick Siliany (bass), Victor Cunha (drums)
- Website: www.southcry.com

South Cry is a Brazilian rock band formed in 2000 in the city of Cordeiro in Rio de Janeiro (state), Brazil. Although a Brazilian group, South Cry often writes songs in English and has three albums.

== History ==
The band emerged in 2000, when three guys, from Cordeiro and the city of Bom Jardim, Rio de Janeiro, decided to get together to form a group of rock musicians. After a while, the band managed to record a demo called "Don't Drink My Tears" in a studio in Bom Jardim. The music was played on some radio stations of the region, having wide acceptance, and this encouraged the South Cry to develop their first album, called "Beyond Metaphor". This debut album was recorded in Bom Jardim, in the year 2001-2002. It was released in 2003 with many difficulties, because the band did not have adequate tools, having used borrowed equipment, and a poor production system. However the album was considered a surprise, having received rave reviews in magazines about music, like the Rock Brigade. After recording, the band got signed to a label, but that contract was only for distribution, not having involvement with projects for dissemination. Despite these difficulties, South Cry continued trying to publicize their work, performing and writing up a video clip of the band's first hit, "Virtual Freedom" independently.

After a period of hiatus with no new recordings, South Cry felt the need to write a new work. Then an uncle of Guill Erthal, guitarist, financed the recording of their second album, titled "Keep an Eye on Me" in a studio in the city of Rio de Janeiro in 2007. Despite not having a heavyweight producer, the second album (2008) made the group leverage its disclosure, managing to put songs on the radio celebrities, such as Radio Transamerica, of Brazil. First the song "Virtual Freedom" (from Beyond Metaphor) had been released, even before the recording of Keep an Eye on Me. Shortly thereafter, the songs "Rebel Angel" and " Whatever You Try" became part of the radio broadcast. Despite gaining notoriety, South Cry could not gain more disclosures for the second album.

In 2009, the American Jeremiah Thompson took over as manager of the band, creating the label Big Sky Rock. Thus, work began to be disclosed, even if timidly out of Brazil, in countries like the United States and Denmark. Soon after the band began looking for big producers, which would give visibility to a possible third disc. Many producers of weight were asked if interested in working with South Cry, then the winner of the Grammy Sylvia Massy was chosen to produce the third release. The album Blue Moon, the first non-independent, was recorded in mid-2010 at the famous Compass Point Studios in the Bahamas, which has hosted renowned artists such as U2, Bob Marley, Iron Maiden and the Rolling Stones. The album was released on November 21, 2010, and its release had begun in the United States and England, which has already put two songs among the top positions. The band plans to begin promotion in Brazil.

== Discography ==
- Beyond Metaphor (2003)
- Keep an Eye on Me (2008)
- Blue Moon (2010)
