= Karma Killer =

Karma Killer may refer to:

- "Karma Killer", a 1998 song by Robbie Williams from I've Been Expecting You
- "Karma Killer", a 2001 song by Cyclefly with Chester Bennington from Crave
- Karma Killer, a 2008 album by Negative
