= Pig Latin (disambiguation) =

Pig Latin is a linguistic game that makes use of the English language.

Pig Latin may also refer to:

- Pig Latin, the programming language used by Apache Pig
- "Pig Latin", a song by Baboon on the album Something Good Is Going to Happen to You
