= The Apex Theory (EP) =

EP by The Apex Theory
- Released: October 9, 2001
- Studio: NRG Recording Studios (North Hollywood, California)
- Label: DreamWorks
- Producer: Don Gilmore

Mt. Helium chronology
Extendemo (2000)	The Apex Theory (2001)	Topsy-Turvy (2002)

Professional ratings
Review scores
Source	Rating
Allmusic	link

The Apex Theory is the second extended play by the American rock band Mt. Helium, formerly The Apex Theory. Released on October 9, 2001, it was the band's first release on a major label.

== Track listing ==
No.	Title	Length
1.	"Shhh... (Hope Diggy)"	3:20
2.	"Bullshed"	4:58
3.	"Swing This"	2:19
4.	"4RA's"	2:49
5.	"Trust Ease"	5:29

== Personnel ==
The Apex Theory

- Ontronik — vocals
- Art Karamian — guitar
- Dave Hakopyan — bass guitar
- Sammy J. Watson — drums
