= We Sing and Play =

EP by Baboon
- Released: 1999
- Recorded: February – March 1999 at Crystal Clear Sound, Dallas, Texas
- Genre: Rock and roll
- Length: 24:57
- Label: self-released
- Producer: Baboon, John Congleton

Baboon chronology
Secret Robot Control (1997)	We Sing and Play (1999)	A Bum Note and a Bead of Sweat (2001)

Professional ratings
Review scores
Source	Rating
Dallas Observer	Favorable link

We Sing and Play is an EP by Baboon. It was self-released in 1999. Due to the band's disenchantment with their former record label (Wind-Up), they decided to release this disc without the support of a label. The copyright notice on the back of the disc reads "No label affiliation here, just rock band."

== Track listing ==
1. "Rise" – 2:49
2. "Lushlife" – 2:54
3. "Angels" – 5:00
4. "Endlessly" – 3:49
5. "Closer" – 3:56
6. "012 seconds" – 5:37
7. "Show Me the Way to Go Home" (hidden track, performed by Steven Barnett's grandmother, Mable Callahan Barnett) – 0:52

All songs by Baboon.

== Personnel ==
- Andrew Huffstetler – vocals, trombone
- Mike Rudnicki – guitar, backing vocals
- Steven Barnett – drums
- Mark Hughes – bass
- Mark Reznicek – additional snare drum (on "Rise" and "012 seconds")
- John "Corn Mo" Cunningham – rock'n'roll piano (on "Lushlife")
- Kari Luna – organ (on "Closer" and "Endlessly")
- James Henderson – mellotron (on "Angels")
- Dan Barnett – band photograph
- Ed Sherman – layout
