= LLK =

LLK may refer to:

- Lollipop Lust Kill, American band
- Lankaran International Airport (IATA code: LLK)
- Lycée Lakanal, French high school and college preparatory school
