= Emotionless =

"Emotionless" may refer to:

- "Emotionless" (Drake song)
- "Emotionless" (Red Sun Rising song)
- "Emotionless", a song by Baboon from Face Down in Turpentine
