= All American City =

All American City may refer to:

- "All American City" (song), a song by Brutal Juice
- All-America City Award, a designation from the National Civic League
