= Acroma (band) =

American alternative rock band

- Also known as: No Release (1999-2002)
- Origin: Salt Lake City, Utah, United States
- Genres: Rock, alternative rock, post-grunge
- Years active: 1999–2004
- Label: Universal (2002-2003)
- Members: Jeremy Stanley; Brian Christensen; Tom Collins; Joshua Zirbel

Acroma was an alternative rock band originally formed in Salt Lake City, Utah. They released one album, Orbitals in 2003 on Universal Records, before disbanding shortly afterwards.

== History ==
=== Formation as "No Release" (1999–2002) ===
The band originally formed in the late 1990s under the name "No Release". The band consisted of Jeremy Stanley on vocals, Brian Christensen on guitar, Tom Collins on bass and Joshua Zirbel on drums. Initially the band spent the late 1990s and early 2000s building up a local following in Salt Lake City, Utah. During this time, the band managed to self-release a three-song demo, and get a song on a local unsigned band compilation album. The band soon started working with Steve Walker (Contraband Management) and recorded a 6-song demo with producer Rob Daiker (Royal Bliss, Slowrush, Camaro Hair) The demo was noticed by Tom Mackay from Universal Records, who signed them to a record deal in 2002.

=== Orbitals and break-up (2003–2004) ===
After signing with Universal Records, the band was renamed as "Acroma". The band entered the studio with producer Sylvia Massy, producer of Tool's first album Undertow in 1993. As such, the music took a direction that was very much influenced by Tool, as well as Tool frontman Maynard James Keenan's other band, A Perfect Circle.

The band recorded its first album at RadioStar Studios, in Weed, California. The album, Orbitals, was delayed over a year due to issues with the record label, but was finally released on May 6, 2003. AllMusic gave the album a mixed review, noting that the band could be "over-dramatic" but thay they showed "solid talent." The band released two songs as singles "Sun Rises Down" and "Wash Away (Some Desert Night)" to radio. They received National radio play on stations around the country, and on Sirius Satellite Radio's "Octane" station and charted on the Mediabase active rock chart peaking at No. 39. As a result of the lack of sales for the album, the band was dropped from their record label, and quietly broke up.

== Band members ==
- Jeremy Stanley – vocals (1999–2004)
- Brian Christensen – guitar (1999–2004)
- Tom Collins – bass (1999–2004)
- Joshua Zirbel – drums (1999–2004)

== Discography ==
- Orbitals (2003)
