= Seven Years Past =

American rock band

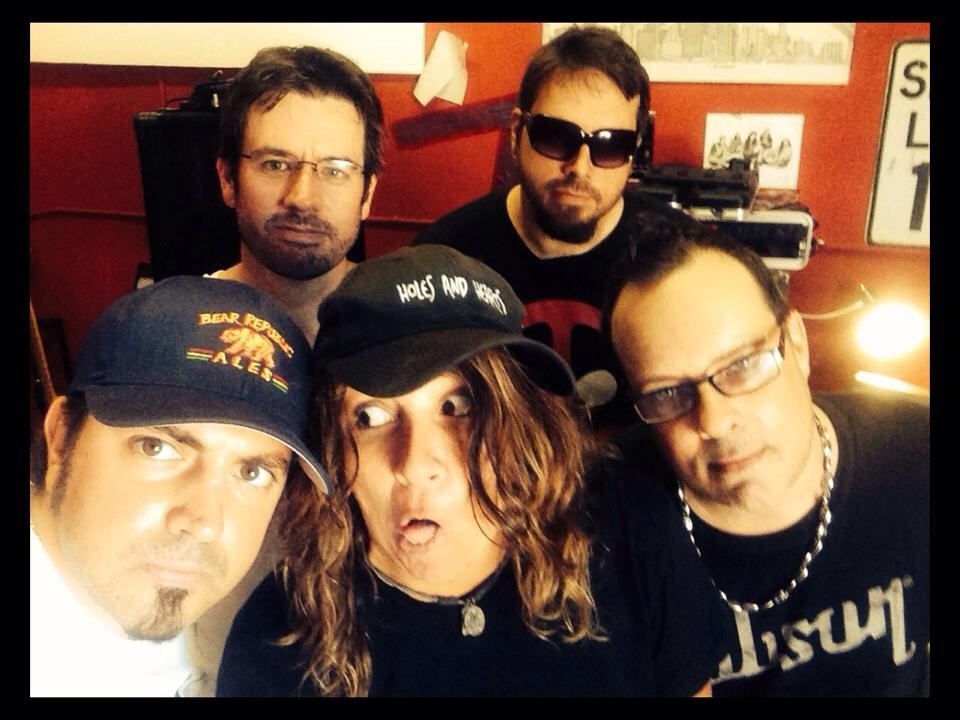

Background information
- Origin: Sarasota, Florida, United States
- Genres: Hard rock; Metal
- Years active: 2009–present
- Labels: Lickalotopus
- Members: Lisa Larkin; Mark Medeiros; Stephan Rosser; Matt Borror
- Past members: Bret Calltharp; J. Capps; Allen Pryor; Brett Jones
- Website: sypband.com

Seven Years Past is a hard rock/metal band from Sarasota, Florida, consisting of Lisa Larkin (vocals/guitar), Mark Medeiros (guitar/vocals), Stephan Rosser (bass/keys), and Matt Borror (drums).

== History ==
Seven Years Past formed in 2008. In 2010, they recorded their first full-length album. Produced by multi-platinum producer Sylvia Massy (Tool, Red Hot Chili Peppers, Sevendust, Johnny Cash) and mastered by Tom Baker (30 Seconds to Mars, Velvet Revolver) of Precision Mastering, 24 Days in May features such crowd favorites as the hard-hitting "Knots", the soaring ballad "Recent Tragedy", and the pop-infused introspection of "You Said".

In June 2012, the band headed to Buffalo, N.Y. to record a follow-up album with Goo Goo Dolls co-founder/bassist Robby Takac producing. Recorded at GCR Audio in Buffalo, the band worked with Takac to polish the sound and utilized the talents of Richie English to compose strings for their ballad "24-7" as well as piano accompaniment to the song "Let You Down". The record, titled Switches, was released on March 1, 2013, at a CD-release show in their hometown of Sarasota, Florida.

Seven Years Past features a blend of heartfelt, emotional lyrics and raw musical power. "It's definitely edge-of-your-seat style. That's what we're trying to go for." Larkin said. "We are mainstream rock – not too heavy, not too light – just right." Larkin's soulful lyrics originate from a number of sources, as she told New York's Tool & Die Magazine: "Inspiration comes from other peoples' mistakes. Mistakes that affect my friends, thus affecting me. People that I love. It's sick. I watch them break up, make up, and I write about it all. Music, it's almost like a photograph for me. It can tell me where I've been."

== Appearances ==
During the summer of 2010, Seven Years Past was selected to provide direct tour support for Tantric, which provided them exposure in the eastern United States. They have appeared in multiple Battle of the Bands competitions, including the Seminole Hard Rock Hotel and Casino Tampa's Battle of the Bands, where they were entered for a chance to win a spot to open for Bon Jovi for the Hard Rock Calling music festival in London. On March 17, 2011, they were featured on My Fox Tampa Bay and promoted by Hard Rock Tampa for winning this contest. Due to their win in the Hard Rock International Battle of the Bands, Seven Years Past was also booked to share the stage with Saving Abel and Taproot in April and May 2011 respectively.

The band has headlined venues across Florida, from Freebird Live in Jacksonville Beach to The State Theatre in St. Petersburg and Hard Rock Cafe, Orlando, with dates that have included direct support slots for Saving Abel, Taproot, Alien Ant Farm, Filter, Fuel, Vertical Horizon, Sponge, as well as a performance at Tampa’s 1-800-ASK-GARY Amphitheatre with Journey, Night Ranger, and Foreigner.

== Band members ==
Current

- Lisa Larkin – vocals, backing guitar
- Mark Medeiros – guitar, backing vocals
- Stephan Rosser – bass guitar, keys
- Matt Borror – drums

Past

- Brett Jones – drums
- Bret Calltharp – bass
- Allen Pryor – drums
- J. Capps – bass

== Discography ==
- 24 Days in May (2010)
- Switches (2013)
