= A Bum Note and a Bead of Sweat =

Live album by Baboon
- Released: February 27, 2001
- Recorded: March 31, 2000 at The Curtain Club; April 14, 2000 at Trees
- Genre: Rock and roll
- Length: 58:43
- Label: Last Beat
- Producer: Baboon, John Congleton

Baboon chronology
We Sing and Play (1999)	A Bum Note and a Bead of Sweat (2001)	Something Good Is Going to Happen to You (2002)

Professional ratings
Review scores
Source	Rating
Dallas Observer	(favorable) link
PopMatters	(favorable) link

A Bum Note and a Bead of Sweat is a live album by Baboon. It was released in 2001 on Last Beat Records and re-released later that year on The Orchard. The album was recorded live to 16-track at two shows in early 2000.

The CD also contains a music video (in QuickTime format) for the studio-version of "Closer," which was directed by Dennis Fitzgerald.

== Track listing ==
All tracks are written by Baboon, except where noted.

No.	Title	Length
1.	"Lush Life"	3:02
2.	"California Dreamin'"	3:23
3.	"Evil"	3:40
4.	"Rise"	3:06
5.	"Endlessly"	3:55
6.	"Closer"	4:27
7.	"Kamikaze"	2:54
8.	"I'm Okay If You're Okay"	4:01
9.	"Nation of Twos"	2:56
10.	"Can't Hardly Stand It" (Charlie Feathers)	3:13
11.	"Master Salvatoris"	2:07
12.	"Save Me"	4:23
13.	"Sucker"	4:27
14.	"Bring Me the Head of Jack Skinner"	8:05
15.	"E"	5:04

== Personnel ==
- Andrew Huffstetler – lead Vocals, trombone, floor tom
- Mark Hughes (credited as "Badnwz Hughes") – bass, backing vocals
- Mike Rudnicki (credited as "Robonicki") – guitar, backing vocals
- Steven Barnett – drums, room evacuator (RE1), and misc.
- Mark Reznicek – floor tom (on "Rise")
- Joshua Dillard – trumpet (on "Bring Me the Head of Jack Skinner")
- Neil Kopp – saxophone (on "Bring Me the Head of Jack Skinner")
- Rob Thomasson – recording
- Ben Yeager – mixing
- John Congleton – mixing
- George Geurin – mastering
- Chris Paluska – layout
- Dennis Fitzgerald – directed "Closer" video
