= Silver Griffin =

- Origin: San Francisco, California, USA
- Genres: Jazz, Funk, Pop, Blues, Indie
- Years active: 2005 – 2010
- Website: www.silvergriffinmusic.com

Silver Griffin is an American band that was formed in 2005 by Liam McCormick, Greg Black, and Seabrien Arata. They are from San Francisco and have played multiple sold out shows at the Cafe du Nord. They combine elements from jazz, pop, funk, blues and indie music to create an extremely unusual sound. They were also known as "Silver Griffin and the Family Crest" but have since dropped "the Family Crest" portion of the name. In the summer of 2006, six months after their formation, the band spent a three-month stint in Weed, California recording their first full-length album with producer Sylvia Massy (Tool (band), Red Hot Chili Peppers, Prince, System of a Down, Smashing Pumpkins and Johnny Cash). Their album "Here in the Night" was released in the summer of 2007. In 2008 the band's music was featured in the soundtracks of two major motion pictures,"The Hottie and the Nottie" starring Paris Hilton which featured the songs "Baby" and "Bottle", "The Year of Getting to Know Us" starring Jimmy Fallon, Lucy Liu, Tom Arnold and Sharon Stone) which featured the song "Longer". The song "Longer" was also featured in the movie trailer "Center Stage - Turn it Up" a 2009 Sony Pictures release.

== Discography ==
Here in the Night - 2007
