= I Love the Way They Scream When They Die =

Live album by Brutal Juice
- Released: 1994
- Recorded: March 5 and April 16, 1994 at Emo's, Austin, TX
- Genre: Acid punk
- Length: 69:55
- Label: Homus Boyus (U.S.) / Alternative Tentacles (Europe)
- Producer: N/A

Brutal Juice chronology
How Tasty Was My Little Timmy? (1991)	I Love the Way They Scream When They Die (1994)	Mutilation Makes Identification Difficult (1995)

I Love the Way They Scream When They Die is a live album by Brutal Juice. It was recorded at two shows in Austin, Texas in early 1994.

The album was self-released (attributed to "Homus Boyus Productions") later that year in the United States, where it was distributed by Alternative Tentacles. In Europe, Alternative Tentacles released the album on the label as Virus 157.

== Track listing ==
1. "Lashings of the Ultra-Violent" – 2:55
2. "Cannibal Holocaust" – 5:09
3. "Humus Tahini" – 4:47
4. "Hardcore and Wine" – 2:14
5. "Galaxy" – 4:17
6. "Doorman" – 4:52
7. "Numbskull" – 2:55
8. "Whorehouse of Screams" – 6:36
9. "Cathy Rigby" – 5:12
10. "Nation Wide" – 5:17
11. "The Vaginals" – 2:18
12. "Kentucky Fuck Daddy" – 3:49
13. "Waxing Gibbous" – 4:54
14. "Black Moment of Panic" – 4:25
15. "Punk Fuck" – 3:23
16. "Pull the Plug" – 6:52

== Personnel ==
- Craig Welch - lead vocals
- Gordon Gibson - lead vocals, guitar
- Ted Wood - guitar, vocals
- Ben Burt - drums
- Sam McCall - bass, vocals
- Joey Gibson - additional vocals (on "Cathy Rigby")

== Reception ==
Ira A. Robbins expressed that the album has largely been made redundant due to the release of the bands other album Mutilation Makes Identification Difficult but that it is somewhat noteworthy for including versions of the bands first two A-sides "Black Moment of Panic" and "Punk Fuck". He also expressed that the previously unreleased song "Pull the Plug" is a nasty piece of noice.
