= Distortion Mirrors =

English alternative rock band

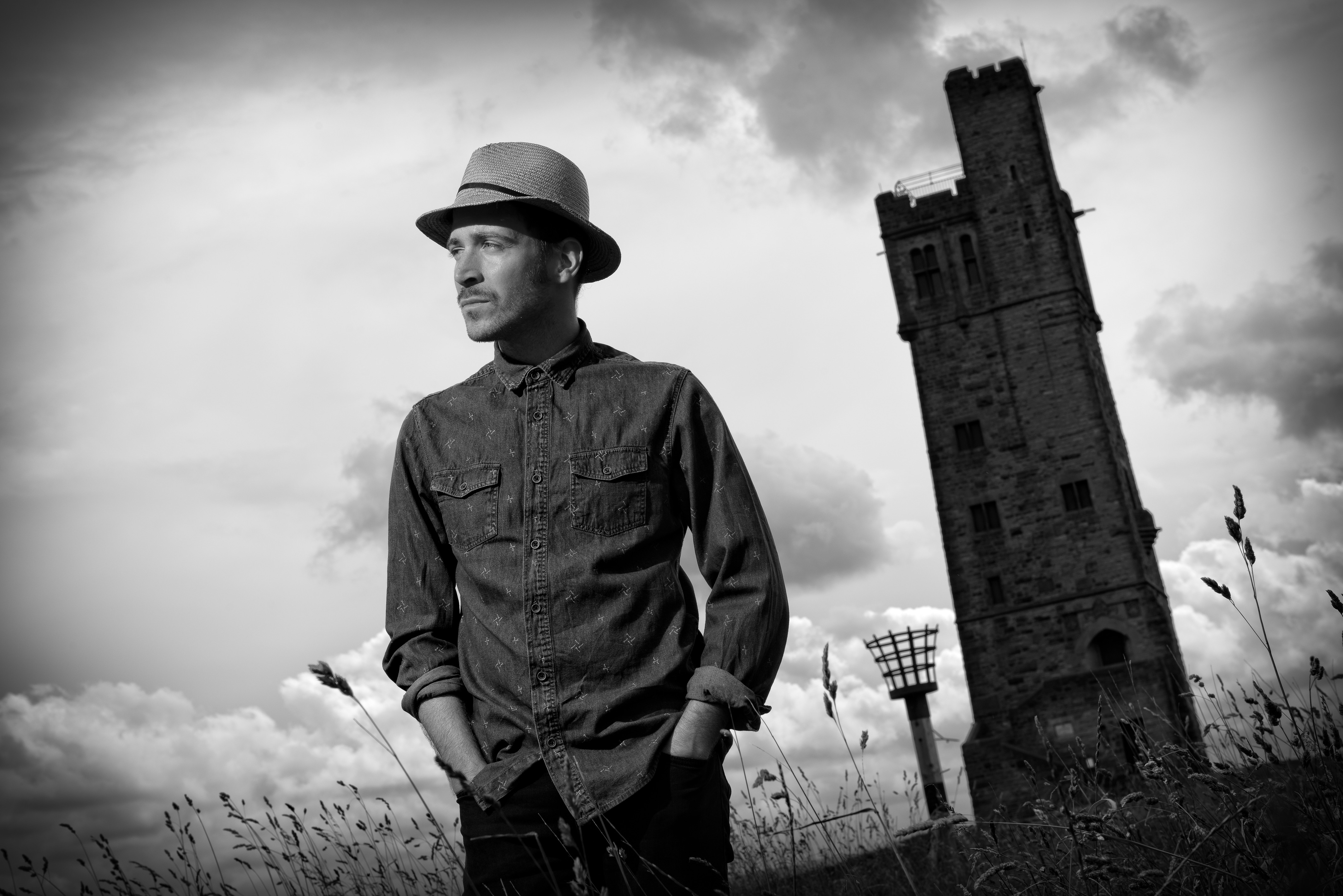
- Distortion Mirrors in 2022

Background information
- Origin: Leeds, West Yorkshire, England
- Genres: Indie pop; noise pop; shoegazing; alternative rock
- Years active: 2013–present
- Labels: Surrism Phonoethics; The Orchard
- Members: Luke Worle
- Past members: Joseph Brooks; Josiah Brooks; Will Stock; Will Sensicle; Kamuela Kim; Jake Ross Fireman

Distortion Mirrors is an English alternative rock band, based in Leeds, West Yorkshire, England, and who was formed in 2011.

== Formation ==
Classically trained pianist Luke Worle is the primary songwriter, and the band began as an arty Dream-Pop bedroom project called "Starry Eyed Wonder" but quickly changed gears. They recorded their debut EP with producer Sylvia Massy, who has produced records for such bands as Tool, System of a Down, Johnny Cash, Red Hot Chili Peppers and others. The resulting EP, Circle of Wolves, was released in the summer of 2011 by the experimental German label Surrism-Phonoethics. In late 2011, the band relocated to Los Angeles and played a series of shows in Hollywood including the Whisky a Go Go, broadening their appeal and shaping their sound from industrial noise to the 1990s alternative rock of Smashing Pumpkins and My Bloody Valentine.

== Zeros and Kings EP ==
In 2012, Distortion Mirrors finished recording their second EP in Los Angeles. The first single from the Zeros and Kings EP, "Death by Love", was released by Under the Radar to enthusiastic buzz, with the band favorably compared to Smashing Pumpkins and Nine Inch Nails. Impose magazine praised the track, writing "Luke Worle and Josiah Brooks further live up to their moniker reflective fuzziness as they prepare their follow up to 2011's suRRism Phonoethics release, Circle of Wolves with precision guided dissonance applied to the infectious vernacular." Shortly thereafter Beats Per Minute premiered the second single, "Streets of Fire, Heart of Ice", to glowing praise, with writer Joshua Pickard saying "Bands like The Smashing Pumpkins and Weezer lay battered alongside the wayside as the duo rushes through their collective influences at a marathon pace." The press has favorably compared the duo, consisting of Worle on synthesizers and lead vocals and Brooks on guitar, to the edgier and grittier alternative rock movement of the 1990s.

Spin magazine gave the third and final single, "Prom Queen", a positive review, with writer Kyle McGovern calling the song "a fuzzy hip-shaker that lines quiet-loud dynamics with New Wave glee". Impose's Sjimon Gompers wrote "'Prom Queen' takes you back to those awkward dances, where the tiaras are discarded for the superficiality of the pomp and circumstance that most are forced to go and grow through during the so-called, 'time of your life'." Poptimes magazine has featured "Death by Love" trending in their popular section for the summer. Beats Per Minute said of Distortion Mirrors that "They concoct a dense, viscous amalgamation of their influences and let the sounds bounce off one another in a spiraling display of studio wizardry."

Alan Cross wrote that the band "showcase their appreciation for such seminal acts as My Bloody Valentine and even Sonic Youth with Brooks’ carefree guitar in the mix". Distortion Mirrors digitally released Zeros and Kings on 13 August via Rustcat Records, and performed a series of shows in Los Angeles and later a series of mini UK show dates in the winter of 2015. Jay Abbondanza of Violent Success magazine praised the record, awarding it an 8.8. out of 10 and concluding that "I can't wait to see their next reflection". Matt Crosslin of Down the Line Zine wrote that the record "explores a very interesting tension between dark themes and hope, between dealing with demons and finding redemption".

The band was nominated for Los Angeles's The Deli magazine's "Artist of the Month" and won in September 2013. Expanding to a 4-piece in 2015, Distortion Mirrors finished a tour of the United Kingdom, culminating in a show at Manchester Academy.

== Hiatus and solo projects ==
In 2017, Worle created a solo project called Sea of Orchids and put Distortion Mirrors on hiatus. Sea of Orchids was short lived, managing one record that remains unreleased. After that project ended, Worle was subsequently signed to Postlude Paradox and The Orchard/Sony, where he released 9 full-length records under the Ashes and Afterglow monicker from 2020 to 2021.

== End of hiatus and band return ==
In 2021, Worle, now the only remaining member of Distortion Mirrors, brought the band out of hiatus, and recruited producer Jack Shirley who has produced for Deafheaven among other eclectic wall of sound bands, to produce, engineer and mix the band's debut LP, which is currently being mixed and prepared for a 2022 release. Worle is currently recruiting a live lineup.

== Influences ==
The band cites Smashing Pumpkins, Peter Gabriel, My Bloody Valentine, Mogwai, Keith Green, The Beatles, The Ronettes, Phil Spector and Black Sabbath as strong influences in their sound, creative aesthetic and approach to music, both sonically and psychologically. They are strong proponents of synthesizing art and faith. In August 2013, they were featured in BPM magazine's Q and A "On Deck" in which they discussed the records that shaped their art, faith and music making perspective.

== Members ==
- Luke Worle – synthesizers, piano, mellotron, percussion, lead vocals

== Discography ==
- Circle of Wolves (EP, Surrism-Phonoethics, 2011)
- Zeros and Kings (EP/CD, Self-Released, 2013)
- Heaven Or Hologram (LP/CD, The Orchard, Postlude Paradox, 2020)
