= Cyclefly =

Alternative rock band (1995–2003)

- Also known as: Dogabone
- Origin: Cork, Ireland
- Genre: Alternative rock
- Years active: 1995–2003
- Labels: Radioactive Records; MCA Records; Island Records

Cyclefly were an alternative rock band from Cork, Ireland, and Antibes, France.

The band toured on both sides of the Atlantic many times, including headline and support tours with Bush, Live, Linkin Park, and Iggy Pop. The band also played at a number of major music festivals, including Reading and Leeds Festivals, Woodstock 99, and Ozzfest. They released two full-length albums; the critically acclaimed Generation Sap in 1999, recorded in the Sound City Studios in Van Nuys, Los Angeles, California, which was produced by Sylvia Massy, and Crave in 2002, produced by Colin Richardson, Bill Appleberry and Tobias Miller. Crave also featured a guest vocal spot on "Karma Killer" from Linkin Park vocalist Chester Bennington.

In the early 2000s, the band dissolved with members moving to a band called Hueman. While guitarist Nono Presta went on form alt metal outfit That Falling Feeling. In the early 2010s, Mako (and later Mako DC) formed through former members.

== Discography ==
Cyclefly discography
- Studio albums: 2
- EPs: 2
- Singles: 4
- Music videos: 3

=== Albums ===
Year	Album details	Peak chart positions
Year	Album details	IRL
1999	Generation Sap: Released: 11 May 1999; Label: Radioactive; Formats: CD	—
2002	Crave: Released: 8 April 2002; Label: Radioactive MCA; Formats: CD	13
"—" denotes a title that did not chart.

=== EPs ===
- Dogabone (1995)
- Cyclefly (1998)

=== Singles ===
- "Supergod"
- "Violet High"
- "No Stress" – UK No. 68
- "Karma Killer" (feat. Chester Bennington)
