= Mutilation Makes Identification Difficult =

Studio album by Brutal Juice
- Released: May 22, 1995
- Recorded: Arlyn Studios, Austin, TX
- Genre: Acid punk
- Length: 67:50
- Label: Interscope
- Producer: Brutal Juice, Stuart Sullivan

Brutal Juice chronology
I Love the Way They Scream When They Die (1994)	Mutilation Makes Identification Difficult (1995)	Welcome to the Panopticon (2016)

Professional ratings
Review scores
Source	Rating
AllMusic	4.5/5 stars

Mutilation Makes Identification Difficult is the first studio album by the self-described "acid punk" band Brutal Juice. It was released on Interscope Records on May 22, 1995. The album features "Nationwide" and "The Vaginals," two tracks which received airplay (primarily on college radio stations).

"The Vaginals" was retitled "Ugly on the Inside" (after the song's chorus) due to the label's choice to promote it as the album's single. Later pressings of the album (as well as the music video) bear the latter title for track #3.

A working title for this album was Everything's Coming Up Toilets. The final title was chosen when the band found decaying human remains in the woods near the recording studio and later read "Mutilation Makes Identification Difficult" as a headline in the local newspaper.

== Critical reception ==
The Washington Post wrote that "those of the band's lyrics that can be discerned do indeed seem brutal, but they're tempered by a surprising pop savvy. Aside from the 15 minutes of ambient indulgence that close the album, these songs are cannily structured and sometimes even catchy." Stylus Magazine called it a "bitingly funny record in spots."

== Track listing ==
1. "Kentucky Fuck Daddy" – 3:51
2. "Burpgun" – 3:59
3. "The Vaginals" – 2:13
4. "Nationwide" – 5:14
5. "Lashings of the Ultra-violent" – 2:36
6. "Kathy Rigby" – 4:23
7. "Galaxy" – 4:02
8. "Curbjob" – 2:51
9. "Humus Tahini" – 5:13
10. "Character Assassination Attempt" – 3:22
11. "Cannibal Holocaust" – 4:21
12. "Doorman" – 5:44
13. "Whorehouse of Screams" – 20:01

== Personnel ==
- Craig Welch - lead vocals, guitar, boom
- Gordon Gibson - lead vocals, guitar, keyboard, toilets (the album artwork features several photographs of what appear to be bloody toilets)
- Ted Wood - guitar, vocals
- Ben Burt - drums, percussion, vocals
- Sam McCall - bass, guitar, vocals, pre-production
- Emma Gibson - additional keyboards
- Joey Gibson - additional vocals (on "Kathy Rigby")
- Commander Adama - additional weirdness
- Dwayne Smith - road guru
- Adam Katz - executive producer, management
- Stuart Sullivan - producer
- Sylvia Massy - mixer (at Pedernales Studio, except "The Vaginals")
- Boo McLeod - second engineer
- Steve Starnes - second engineer
- Unleashed - art direction+design
- David Quadrini - paintings
- Vanessa Carlson - band photos
- Mariah Aguiar - band photos
- Dylan Griffin - toilets
