= Sea Hags =

American hard rock band

Background information
- Origin: San Francisco, California, U.S.
- Genres: Sleaze rock, hard rock, glam metal
- Years active: 1985–1990
- Labels: Chrysalis
- Past members: Ron Yocom; Chris Schlosshardt; Greg Langston; Frank Wilsey; Adam Maples

Sea Hags was an American hard rock band from San Francisco, California. Their style has been referred to as motorcycle rock and sleaze metal. They released one self-titled album in 1989.

== History ==
Sea Hags formed in San Francisco in 1985 by frontman Ron Yocom, and bassist Chris Schlosshardt. During the three years before they had the chance to record a major label debut album, they often worked two jobs to keep their dreams of a music career alive. During the band's early years they played gigs with bands such as Dead Kennedys, Motörhead, the Ramones, and The Cramps. They were signed to Chrysalis Records in December 1987.

Kirk Hammett, the guitarist of Metallica, co-produced their first demos with Sylvia Massy, who went on to produce two releases by progressive rock band Tool. Ian Astbury of The Cult offered to produce their debut. Finally Mike Clink, who had just finished producing Guns N' Roses' Appetite for Destruction was enlisted by the group as producer. Guitarist Frank Wilsey, who had recently left the San Francisco band Head On, joined in November 1988, shortly before the band started to record their eponymous debut for Chrysalis with Clink. Drummer Greg Langston also gave way during this period to Adam Maples. Kevin Russell, a musician who had performed on Ted Nugent's Penetrator, contributed additional guitar to the recording. Before finishing the album, the band wrote the track "Under The Night Stars" for the movie A Nightmare on Elm Street 4: The Dream Master.

The band toured Britain in June 1989, opening for The Georgia Satellites. This stint in the UK also gave them the opportunity to do a short headline club tour including Bristol Bierkeller. In October 1989, Frank Wilsey quit the group.

The band disbanded in February 1990, apparently because of drug abuse and poor management. After the dissolution, Adam Maples became the drummer for Guns N' Roses for a short period in 1990 before Matt Sorum took over the slot. Chris Schlosshardt died on February 1, 1991 of bronchial pneumonia, officially ending the band's existence. Frank Wilsey changed his name to Wilcox (and then Wilsex) and joined Arcade, a band started by former Ratt vocalist Stephen Pearcy. He also played with Pearcy's band Nitronic. Ron Yocom went on to team up with industrial goth rocker Sarine Voltage, forming The Power of 3, a "Now Wave" project that he currently co-fronts.

The Sea Hags re-existed for a short time in 2007, under the management of Wendee Key, with Ron Yocom as the frontman. The band quickly decayed due to unexplained issues between management and band members.

== Members ==
- Ron Yocom – vocals, guitar (1985–1990)
- Chris Schlosshardt – bass (1985–1990; died 1991)
- Greg Langston – drums (1985–1988)
- Frank Wilsey – guitar (1988–1989)
- Adam Maples – drums (1988–1990)

== Discography ==
=== Studio albums ===
- Sea Hags (1989)
