= Sarine Voltage =

American singer-songwriter

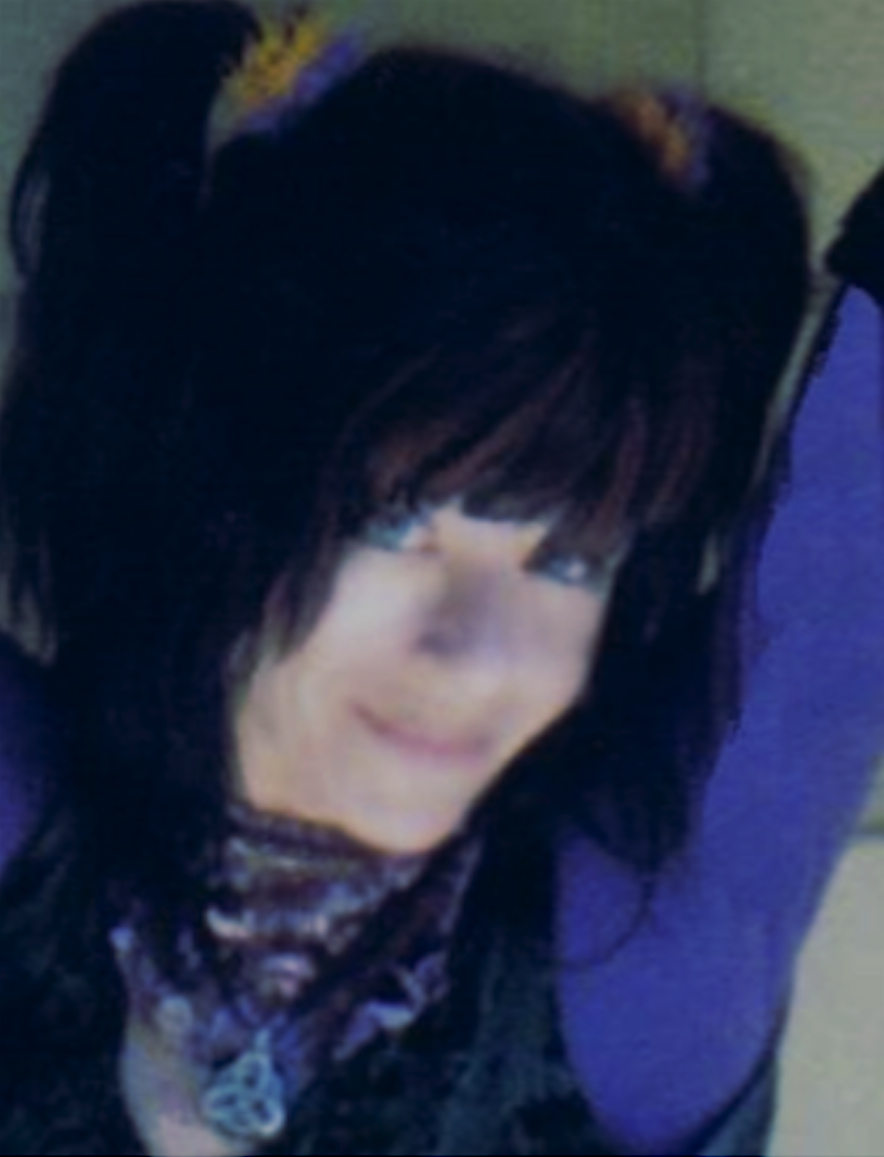
- Voltage in 2004

Background information
- Born: December 27, 1959 (age 66); Hellertown, Pennsylvania, U.S.
- Genres: alternative rock, gothic rock, industrial rock, indie rock, new wave, hip-pop
- Instrument: Multi-instrumentalist
- Years active: 1983–present

Sarine Voltage (born December 27, 1959) is an American musician, singer-songwriter, multi-instrumentalist and producer. She is best known for her work with San Francisco "now wave" hip-pop band The Power of 3, as well as industrial goth rockers, 'universal black'.

== Early years ==
Voltage began her musical quest at the age of 3, with formal ballet, tap, and jazz dance training at Rita Ruth's Conservatory of Dance in Hellertown, Pennsylvania, where she continued on until graduation. At the age of five, her father brought home a piano and she began to teach herself to play with the aid of a few John Thompson books. With no formal training, she enrolled in an Improvisation class in high school and managed to get into Berklee College of Music based on the recommendation of her teacher, Louis Mazza.

== Musical career ==
First playing as keyboardist with Allentown, Pennsylvania-based band Steel Town Underground, MIDI programming and lead vocals were soon added to Voltage's bill.

In 1989, she headed west to start her own band in San Francisco, 'universal black'. The first line-up (1992) included Joe Devlin (Insanity Puppets) on drums, Craig Merrilees on keys/programming and guitar, and Danny Schramm on lead vocal. Fraught with band members’ personal issues and struggles with addiction, this line-up was short-lived.

Voltage next hooked up with Santa Rosa goth-rockers Pinocchio Vampire (1993–1995), which led to recording (with indie label Venture Beyond Records) and international performances from Moscow to Siberia (1994). The PV '94 tour culminated with the Inter-Week festival, a huge event sponsored by Novosibirsk State University and supported by the British Council, bringing together cultural and scientific figures in the scientists' enclave of Akademgorodok. Voltage exited the band in 1995 to re-group and focus back on universal black. This 1995 line-up was to feature Mike Rosen (Metagalaxxy), then only 14 years old, on bass/vocals, Mark Smith (PV) on guitar/vocals, and Alex Whitaker on drums/vocals. In 1996 left…right, an 11-song CD, was released on Venture Beyond Records, and an international tour of Poland and Belarus followed, inspired by Holbrook Teter's invitation to represent the U.S. in Mozyr in 1996 where universal black headlined "ECO-ROCK", the benefit relief concert held during the 10th Anniversary of the Chernobyl disaster conferences ("Chernobyl: 10 Years After") to raise consciousness and cash for the Belarusian victims of the meltdown.

Another universal black restructuring came in 1997 when a hard-edged line-up was brought into play: with Joe Devlin back on drums and Mike Rosen still on bass, Sean Canale (X-Men) was brought in to replace Smith on guitar and all four were now doing vocals. They produced a 6-song CD in 1999 entitled electrical tape that included the songs “Tie Me Up”, “Playing Slave Girl”, “Truth”, “Ice Cream (I Scream)”, “F-BOM” and “Sex Games”, getting solid reviews from industry rags like Outburn magazine. “F-BOM” was also featured on the Resin Records compilation of bands out of Santa Rosa appropriately entitled PSR-1 (Pure Santa Rosa-1).

After 10 years of dark goth with appearances in Hex Files: The Goth Bible and such, Voltage wanted a new sound and finally laid universal black to rest in 2001.

After a short yet successful stint with bass player/vocalist Mike Rosen as 'Rosen Voltage', she went on to found the all-keyboard spontaneously created The New Post-Modern Tribal Order with keyboardists Emit Idy (Nezzy Idy) and Shane Cox, producing the 9-track CD, Wiccatronica in 2002.

Another abrupt turn came for Voltage later in 2002 when she was introduced to Chrysalis Records recording artist Ron Yocom of Sea Hags fame. Yocom convinced her to get back to songwriting and the two hit Hollywood as The Power of 3, boasting a fresh rock sound and balancing male and female lead vocals that encouraged love, peace, and thinking for oneself. Voltage and Yocom were highly influenced by the melodic sounds of The Beatles and especially John Lennon. They recorded a handful of their ever-growing repertoire and released the 6-song CD, 6 x 2 in a "pay-what-you-have-or-like" style that may have been a first for the industry, offering it up for free to those without cash. This CD featured the songs "We Are Magick", "In the Mood for Love", "The Usual Things (November)", "I am a Faerie", "Pleasure Baby" and "Black Cat". Malcolm Dome was the first to air The P.O.T.'s hit "We Are Magick" after a live from London interview on TotalRockRadio (2004).

== Discography ==
Sarine Re Voltage

- 9 (2022)

The Power of 3 (The P.O.T.)

- 6 x 2 (2006)

Sarine Voltage & The New Post-Modern Tribal Order

- Wiccatronica (2002)

Universal Black

- electrical tape (2000)

== Singles ==
- "Goin' On"
- "Hey There"
- "Down"
- "Slow"
- "Elevate to the Transition"
- "105.3°"
- "Twin Palms"
- "Left and Right & in Between"
- "Tie Me Up
- "It's a Drag to Drive"
- "Come"
- "Norman Sez"

== Other sources ==
- Outburn (magazine), Issues No. 2, No. 3, No. 6 & No. 11
- North Bay Bohemian, May 11–17, 2005, Critic's Choice by R. V. Scheide
- http://www.sonic.net/venture/music/ublack.html
- http://www.sleazeroxx.com/interviews/ron-yocom-interview/
- http://www.revoltagerecordings.com
- http://www.albionmonitor.com/5-5-96/chernobylshadow.html
