= The Tomorrowpeople =

American psychedelic rock band

- Origin: Dallas, Texas, United States
- Genres: Psychedelic rock
- Years active: 1996–2000
- Labels: Olivia Records, Last Beat/Slab Recordings
- Spinoff of: Brutal Juice, Toadies
- Past members: Gordon Gibson; Jody Powerchurch; Ben Burt; Darrel Herbert; John Norris; Bill Shupp; Don Cento; Michael Allen

The Tomorrowpeople were a psychedelic rock band based in Dallas, TX, featuring former members of Brutal Juice and Toadies.

They took their name from a cult British science fiction show (The Tomorrow People) that aired on ITV in the early '70s. The Tomorrowpeople played and toured with such groups as Tripping Daisy, Spoon, Centro-matic, Sixteen Deluxe and Third Eye Blind.

== History ==
Gordon Gibson formed The Tomorrowpeople in 1996 with his roommate Erich Scholz in Denton, Texas while on a break from touring with Brutal Juice. Following a move to Dallas, the two hooked up with former New Bohemian guitarist Wes Martin who brought them into Steve Curry's SRC Studios in Garland, Texas. Along with Brutal Juice drummer Ben Burt, the group—with Martin on bass—recorded a clutch of songs that would come to be known as Scuzzy Ports. Although never released, the eight-track demo soon attracted the attention of major labels on the West Coast. Enlisting the aid of recently departed Toadies guitarist Darrel Herbert and Chomsky keyboardist John Norris, Gibson and Scholz—who took the nom de rock "Jody Powerchurch"—quickly wrote enough songs for a set and played their first show at Club Dada in Dallas on November 18, 1996.

Their wildly erratic stage shows featured liberal use of old 16mm films and projections courtesy of Gordon and Jody's neighbor Michael Allen as well as live deployment of electronics and samples.

The group signed with Geffen Records in 1998 and recorded an album's worth of material with former Brave Combo and Tripping Daisy drummer Mitch Marine. However, the group departed Geffen before the album was mastered.

Following the departure of Ben Burt, Bill Shupp officially took over drumming chores. Multi-instrumentalist Don Cento was recruited when Herbert and Norris left in 1999. For the group's 2008 incarnation, musicians Gary Parks and Hayes Smith came aboard on guitar and bass, respectively.

The group released two CDs, 1997's Golden Energy on Last Beat/Slab records and 1999's Marijuana Beach—a mini album of demos and unreleased tracks from their aborted 1998 Geffen set. Several other songs have appeared on compilations and promos. In 2008 they released their catalog on iTunes, Rhapsody, Napster, Yahoo and Amazon and issued a third official album, Bounced and Renounced as a download.

The group's Gordon Gibson, Ben Burt and Jody Powerchurch reformed in 2008 with two new members, Gary Parks and Hayes Smith. Their reunion show was on May 17, 2008 at the Double-Wide in Dallas, TX.

The song "Dying Breed" was used in the documentary about Rick Kirkahm called TV Junkie.

== Band members ==
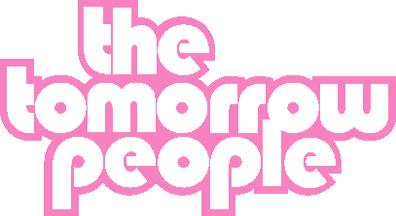
Logo

- Gordon Gibson - lead vocals, guitar, programming
- Jody Powerchurch (ne Erich Scholz) - guitar, bass
- Ben Burt - drums
- Darrel Herbert - bass, guitar
- John Norris - keyboards, vocals
- Bill Shupp - drums, vocals
- Don Cento - guitar, keyboards
- Michael Allen - lights, visuals

== Discography ==
Albums

- Golden Energy (Last Beat/Slab Recordings, 1997)
- Marijuana Beach (Olivia Records, 1999)
- Bounced and Renounced (Olivia Records, 2008)
