= Topsy-Turvy (album) =

Studio album by The Apex Theory
- Released: April 2, 2002
- Studio: NRG Recording Studios (North Hollywood, California)
- Genres: Progressive rock; nu metal
- Label: DreamWorks
- Producer: Don Gilmore

Mt. Helium chronology
The Apex Theory (2001)	Topsy-Turvy (2002)	Lightpost (EP) (2007)

Singles from Topsy-Turvy
- 1. "Shh...(Hope Diggy)" Released: 2002; 2. "Apossibly" Released: 2002

Professional ratings
Review scores
Source	Rating
Allmusic	4/5 stars

Topsy-Turvy is the debut studio album by the American rock band The Apex Theory, now Mt. Helium. Released on April 2, 2002, it was the band's only release as a quartet, with the vocalist Ontronik Khachaturian leaving the band shortly after the album's release. After attempting to audition for a new vocalist, it was decided that the guitarist Art Karamian would take over as the band's vocalist. For its 18 year anniversary, in 2020 it was announced on The Apex Theory Instagram account the limited pressing of Topsy-Turvy on 180g Vinyl for the very first time. To bring awareness and raise funds for the crisis in Armenia, all proceeds after costs will be donated to Armenia Fund.

== Style ==
PopMatters described the album as "an energy-filled fusion of progressive and modern rock." Allmusic compared the album to the music of At the Drive-In and Incubus. CMJ New Music Report made comparisons between Ontronik Khachaturian and Faith No More vocalist Mike Patton. They stated in March 2002, "from Incubus to Dog Fashion Disco, it's hard not to hear the influence of that trendsetting vocalist — best known for his stint with now-defunct Faith No More — stamped all over a huge segment of current rock artists", adding that "like Incubus, Apex Theory takes Patton's ball and runs with it in its own direction."

== Reception ==
Topsy-Turvy peaked at #6 on the Billboard Heatseekers chart and #157 on the Billboard 200.

== Track listing ==
No.	Title	Length
1.	"Add Mission"	3:35
2.	"Mucus Shifters"	2:30
3.	"Come Forth"	3:16
4.	"Shhh... (Hope Diggy)"	3:20
5.	"Drown Ink"	3:09
6.	"Bullshed"	4:59
7.	"That's All!"	3:25
8.	"Bravo"	3:08
9.	"Apossibly"	4:14
10.	"Right Foot"	3:52
11.	"Aisle Always"	3:54
12.	"In Books"	3:59

== Personnel ==
The Apex Theory

- Ontronik Khachaturian — vocals
- Art Karamian — guitar
- Dave Hakopyan — bass guitar
- Sammy J. Watson — drums
