= 81db =

Italian metal band

- Origin: Florence, Italy
- Genres: Alternative metal, progressive metal, avant-garde metal
- Years active: 2006–present
- Labels: Orion's Belt Records (IT); Rising Records (UK); Bakerteam Records (IT)
- Members: Kostas Ladopoulos; Filippo Capursi; Luca Giannoni; Vieri Pestelli
- Website: www.81db.net

81db is an alternative metal band based in Italy, formed in April 2006 by Greek guitarist Kostas Ladopoulos. As he stated in the band's first interviews, the musical idea was to try to combine a new alternative rock/metal sound by mixing melodies and heavy guitar riffs with folk elements derived from Kostas’ Greek origins. The current members of the band are Kostas Ladopoulos (Guitars, Bouzouki), Filippo Capursi (Drums), Luca Giannoni (Vocals) and Vieri Pestelli (Bass). The band had their debut album Evaluation out on 2009 through Orion's Belt Records and published by EMI in Italy and distributed by Minos EMI in Greece. They released two more albums in 2011 and 2013, respectively, and a "Best of" in 2017. After the exit from the band of original singer William Costello, 81db released an Instrumental EP in 2021. In 2022, the band welcomed new singer Luca Giannoni and released a new single in 2023.

== Biography ==
81db was formed in April 2006 by the Greek guitarist Kostas Ladopoulos. After a few changes to the line-up, the band found its original formation, with singer William Costello, Filippo Capursi on drums and Vieri Pestelli on bass. 81db finished their first demo CD at the beginning of November 2006 and the band started to look for a label.

Various podcasts and local radios played the song ‘"Voices’" and got positive reviews for the home-made promo CD. The promo received comments like "Extremely Original", "Without musical limits", and "Psychotic sound", which was exactly what the compositions meant to achieve. In December 2007, "Nice Trip" went to no.1 metal song of 59.330 songs in the US Music Network, Soundclick. In March 2007 81db along with Fabio Bianchini, started filming a video of the song ‘"Voices"’. Later the web platform Digichannel, with rock videos from around the world, chose the video clip to be in their home page. The band kept going and playing concerts to support their promo CD in central and northern Italy. In November 2007, the band signed with a new-born label: Orion's Belt records. A few months later, Deep Purple invited 81db to open their Turin concert on 13 July 2008.

In the meantime, after many successful international reviews to their self-produced 4-track promo EP, many people had become curious on what was going to follow up. In June 2008 the band entered the studio Larione10 of Florence to record 12 tracks which were going to be the final result for their debut album, Evaluation.

Evaluation, out on 20 March 2009 for Orion's Belt Records and published by EMI publishing in Italy, was physically distributed by Minos EMI in Greece and digitally worldwide.

81db, after some very good reviews for the album (Rock Hard Italy – 7.5/10, Metal Hammer Greece – 9/10, and many more webzines and press), began touring the United Kingdom in November 2009 with excellent results and great feedback. The video of ‘"Voices’" was in rotation on Headbanger's ball of MTV Greece, as well as the important Mad TV Greek music television. Their debut album was voted as the "2009 Top Record" from Vasilis Zaharopoulos, an important Metal Hammer editor of the Greek magazine.

All this noise made the producer Sylvia Massy interested at the project, offering the band a chance to work with them at their studios for the upcoming second album.

The second album of the band called Impression was announced to be released on April 25, 2011, by the UK label Rising Records.

In 2013 the band released its third album, A Blind Man's Dream, inspired by the movie One Flew Over the Cuckoo's Nest, for Italian label Bakerteam Records

In 2017 the band self-released a single track, "The Monkey", as part of a "Best of " compilation.

In 2021 the band self-released the Instrumental EP The Movie Sessions 17/21. The EP has 5 songs recorded between 2017 and 2018, after singer William Costello left the band.

In 2022 the band welcomed a new singer, Luca Giannoni, and in 2023 self-released a new single, "A Little Game Called War".

After a 13-year hiatus since their previous release, the band returned in 2025 with Nostos, a ten-track studio album. The title, derived from the Greek word meaning a return home, symbolizes the band’s journey back to music. The record sees the group expanding their musical boundaries while retaining the distinctive style that defines their sound. Marking a new chapter in their career, the release also introduces a new vocalist and coincides with a new tour and additional projects.

== Band members ==
Current members

- Kostas Ladopoulos – Guitars, Bouzouki, Producer (2006–present)
- Vieri Pestelli – Bass (2008–present)
- Filippo Capursi – Drums (2006–present)
- Luca Giannoni – Vocals (2022–present)

Past members

- William Costello – Vocals (2007–2016)
- Antonio Cernivivo- Bass (2006–2007)
- Francesco Payne – Vocals (2006)

== Discography ==
=== Official albums ===
Evaluation (Orion's Belt Records) – Produced by Kostas Ladopoulos

Evaluation – 2009
1. 2000x
2. Mirror
3. Nice Trip
4. Voices
5. Dr. Barytone
6. Revelations
7. Argonaut's Dance
8. Insects
9. Insexts
10. So Wounded
11. W.D.S.
12. Generation xxx
13. aNoia
14. Evaluation

Impressions (Rising Records) – Produced by Sylvia Massy & Kostas Ladopoulos

Impressions – 2011
1. Code 84
2. The Last Laugh
3. Won't Follow You
4. Jabberwocky
5. Wasting my Time
6. Agora
7. Patience
8. Captcha
9. LightPath
10. Luna
11. Petrified (Medusa)
12. FreakShow
13. Impressions

A Blind Man's Dream (Bakerteam Records)- Produced by Kostas Ladopoulos

A Blind Man's Dream – 2013
1. Manicomium
2. Sirens
3. When the Cat's Away (The Mice Will Play)
4. Vanessa's Box
5. House Rules
6. Food for Thought
7. Electroshock
8. Alien Invasion
9. Insane Wishes
10. The Great Escape
11. A Blind Man's Dream

Nostos (EnterOutside music)- Produced by Kostas Ladopoulos

Nostos – 2025
1. Hybris
2. Eastern Tango
3. Echoes
4. Oblivion
5. Whispers of the Eternal Veil
6. Infinite Layers
7. Rêverie
8. Argonautica
9. The Imposter
10. Jump to Hyperspace

=== EPs, Compilations and Singles ===
The Monkey

The Monkey – 2017
1. The Monkey

The Movie Sessions 17/21

The Movie Sessions 17/21 – 2021
1. The Freedom Totem
2. A Running Man
3. The Dagger of Al Sahra
4. Robot Love Potion

A Little Game Called War

A Little Game Called War – 2023
1. A Little Game Called War

== Sources ==
[1] Jam Magazine (Italy, April 2009)

[2] Greek Esquire (Greece, July 2009)

[3] Italian Rock Hard (November 2009, January 2010)

[4] Greek Rock Hard (March 2010)

[5] Greek Metal Hammer (January 2010, March 2010)

== Web Sources ==
- https://www.facebook.com/note.php?note_id=238245464106
- https://www.facebook.com/notes.php?id=14429069387&notes_tab=app_2347471856#!/note.php?note_id=191606179106
- https://www.facebook.com/note.php?note_id=380141914106
- http://www.lordsofmetal.nl/showinterview.php?id=3239&lang=en
- http://behindtheveil.freehostia.com/i81db.html
- https://web.archive.org/web/20110722042002/http://www.metal-empire.it/modules.php?name=News&file=article&sid=3133
- http://www.self.it/ita/details.php?nb=8019991869246&tc=c
- http://www.metal.it/album.aspx/10897/
- https://web.archive.org/web/20100918153616/http://www.rockpages.gr/detailspage.aspx?id=4051&type=1&lang=EN
- https://web.archive.org/web/20110721083714/http://www.rockpages.gr/detailspage.aspx?id=3633&type=3&lang=EN
- https://rockskini.blogspot.com/search/label/-%2081db
- http://ashladan.be/review/81db-evaluation
- http://www.lordsofmetal.nl/showreview.php?id=16166&lang=en#
- https://web.archive.org/web/20101230164025/http://metal-invader.com/gigs/81_Db_2009_11_24/gig.php
