= Lucky Lew =

- Origin: Bergen, Norway
- Genres: Rock
- Years active: 2006 – present
- Labels: Big Noisy Records
- Website: [Www.Facebook.com/Luckylewmusic]

Lucky Lew is a Norwegian rock group based in Bergen, Norway. Formed in 2006 by singer Villa:K(Katrine Stavnes) and guitarist Barillion. They released their first album Hello Miss Devine later the same year with bass player Svein Knutsen and drummer Whezz (Christen Sigridnes)

In September 2010, the band released their second album, Beauty In Aggression.

== Beauty In Aggression ==
In February 2010, Lucky Lew went to RadioStar Studios in Weed, California to record their second album. Produced by Sylvia Massy and engineered/co-produced by Rich Veltrop, the album received the title Beauty In Aggression and was released on September 6, 2010, to generally favourable reviews in the press.

The first single from Beauty In Aggression album was the song Desert Angel, and it was released on May 25, 2010.

== Members ==
=== Current members ===
- Villa:K – Vocals (2006 – )
- Barillion – Guitars (2006 – )
- Svein Knutsen – Bass (2006 – )
- Rune Hals – Drums (2014 – )

=== Former Members ===
- Eskil Sæter – Drums (2008-2014)
- Wolf (Christian Indregaard) – Drums (2007–2008)
- Whezz (Christen Sigridnes) – Drums (2006–2007)

== Discography ==
=== Albums ===
Title	Released	Label
Hello Miss Devine	2006	Lucky Lew Records
Beauty In Aggression	2010	Big Noisy Records
Hear Me Out mini Ep	2017	Big Noisy Records

=== Singles ===
Title	Released	From album
Desert Angel	2010	Beauty In Aggression
