= Generation Sap =

Studio album by Cyclefly
- Released: (United States) 11 May 1999 (United Kingdom) 9 August 1999
- Recorded: 1999 at Sound City Studios (Van Nuys, California)
- Genre: Alternative rock
- Length: 40:27
- Label: Radioactive Records
- Producer: Sylvia Massy

Cyclefly chronology
Generation Sap (1999)	Crave (2002)

Professional ratings
Review scores
Source	Rating
Allmusic	3/5 stars
Daily Vault	(B)

Generation Sap is the debut album from the band Cyclefly, released on 9 August 1999.

== Reception ==
Stuart Green of Exclaim! considered the album "halfway decent", but criticised its perceived lack of originality.

== Track listing ==
All songs written by O'Shea/O'Shea, unless otherwise noted.

No.	Title	Length
1.	"Violet High"	4:11
2.	"Crawl Down"	3:02
3.	"Supergod"	3:15
4.	"Whore"	5:44
5.	"Following Yesterday"	2:37
6.	"Better Than You"	3:37
7.	"Plastic Coated Man"	3:16
8.	"The Hive" (O'Shea/O'Shea/Presta)	3:21
9.	"Generation Sap"	1:59
10.	"Sump"	4:28
11.	"Slaves"	4:56

== Notes ==
- INTERVIEW
