= Cordeiro, Rio de Janeiro =

Cordeiro
- Municipality
- Município de Cordeiro
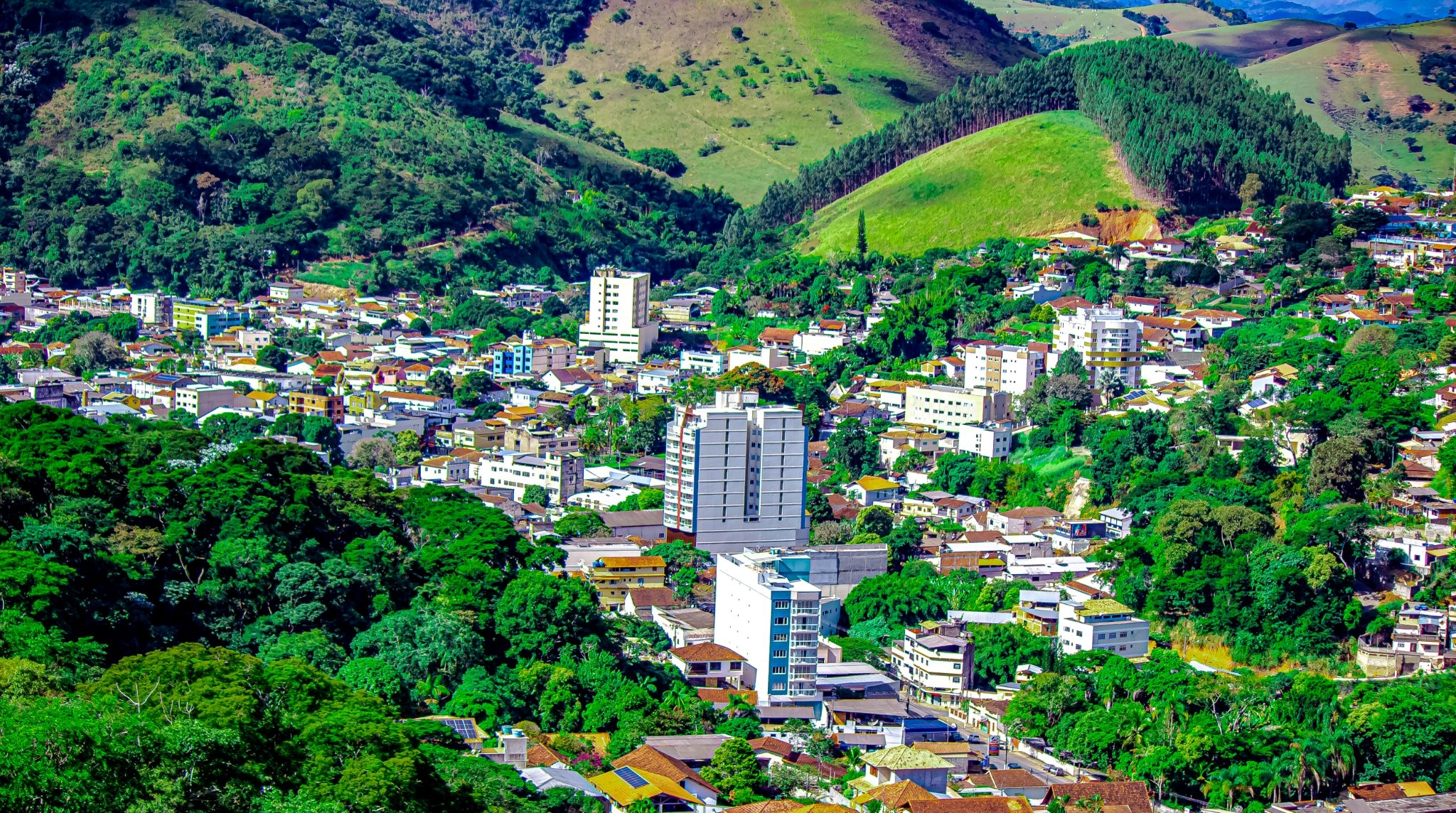

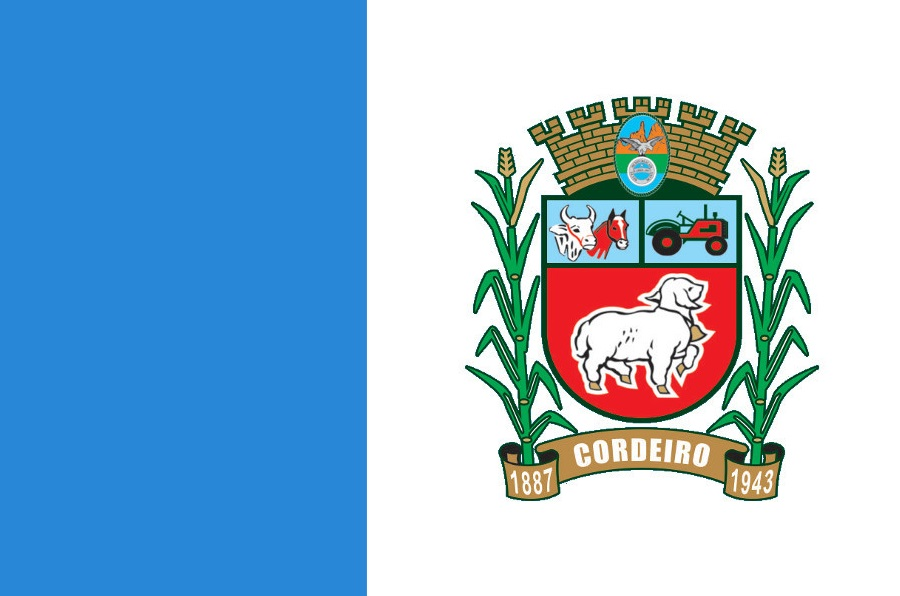
- Flag Coat of arms

- Location of Cordeiro in the state of Rio de Janeiro

- Location of Cordeiro in Brazil
- Coordinates: 22°01′44″S 42°21′39″W
- Country: Brazil
- Region: Southeast
- State: Rio de Janeiro

Government
  - Prefeito: Luciano Ramos (PPS)

Area
  - Total: 116.044 km^{2} (44.805 sq mi)
- Elevation: 485 m (1,591 ft)

Population (2020)
  - Total: 22,041
- Time zone: UTC-3 (UTC-3)

Cordeiro (Portuguese pronunciation: [koʁˈdejɾu]) is a municipality located in the Brazilian state of Rio de Janeiro. Its population was 22,041 (2020) and its area is 116 km^{2}.

The literal translation of the city's name in English is "lamb". Among the city's monuments and attractions are the Methodist church, the park of exhibitions and the Cordeiro Social Club. The city is known for the Cordeiro Agricultural, Commercial and Industrial Exhibition (Expo Cordeiro), considered the oldest exhibition of its kind in Brazil, and for its textile industry.

== Climate ==
Climate data for Cordeiro (1991–2020)
Month	Jan	Feb	Mar	Apr	May	Jun	Jul	Aug	Sep	Oct	Nov	Dec	Year
Mean daily maximum °C (°F)	29.8 (85.6)	30.5 (86.9)	29.4 (84.9)	27.8 (82.0)	25.4 (77.7)	24.8 (76.6)	24.6 (76.3)	25.8 (78.4)	26.8 (80.2)	27.9 (82.2)	27.7 (81.9)	29.0 (84.2)	27.5 (81.5)
Mean daily minimum °C (°F)	19.6 (67.3)	19.6 (67.3)	19.1 (66.4)	17.4 (63.3)	14.7 (58.5)	13.5 (56.3)	12.9 (55.2)	13.3 (55.9)	15.3 (59.5)	17.2 (63.0)	18.2 (64.8)	19.4 (66.9)	16.7 (62.1)
Average precipitation mm (inches)	255.9 (10.07)	128.0 (5.04)	153.0 (6.02)	64.9 (2.56)	41.8 (1.65)	19.2 (0.76)	17.4 (0.69)	20.8 (0.82)	53.5 (2.11)	90.0 (3.54)	214.6 (8.45)	244.8 (9.64)	1,303.9 (51.33)
Average precipitation days (≥ 1.0 mm)	12.9	9.2	11.5	7.1	5.2	3.2	2.9	3.0	5.5	8.5	13.9	15.2	98.1
Source: NOAA
