= Secret Robot Control =

Studio album by Baboon
- Released: April 15, 1997
- Recorded: July 1995 – February 1996
- Studio: Stank Booty Studios, Denton, Texas
- Genre: Rock and roll
- Length: 38:18
- Label: Wind-Up
- Producer: Dave Willingham, Baboon

Professional ratings
Review scores
Source	Rating
Allmusic	2.5/5 stars
Austin Chronicle	3/5 stars
CMJ	(favorable)

Secret Robot Control is the second full-length album by the band Baboon. It was released in April 1997 on Wind-Up Records. The title of the album is taken from a painting by Todd Ramsell, which is featured on the album's cover. The working title of the album was Destroy This Mad Brute!

== Track listing ==
1. "Night of the Long Knives" – 2:57
2. "I'm OK if You're OK" – 3:40
3. "You and I" – 3:50
4. "Numb" – 2:20
5. "The Man with the Plastic Penis" – 2:10
6. "BoxRotter" – 4:36
7. "Bring Me the Head of Jack Skinner" – 3:08
8. "Time Wounds All Heals" – 2:55
9. "A Sip for Strength" – 5:26
10. "You Kill Me" – 4:08
11. "Nation of Twos" – 3:08

All songs by Baboon.

== Personnel ==
- Brian Schmitz - bass (except on "A Sip For Strength" and "Night of the Long Knives"), guitar (on "A Sip For Strength" and "Night of the Long Knives"), backing vocals, organ (on "Boxrotter")
- Mike Rudnicki - guitar (except on "A Sip For Strength" and "Night of the Long Knives"), bass (on "A Sip For Strength" and "Night of the Long Knives"), backing vocals, keyboard (on "Nation of Twos"), thumb piano (on "The Man with the Plastic Penis"), kitchen utensil bashing (on "I'm OK If You're OK")
- Steven Barnett - drums and percussion, keyboard (on "Bring Me the Head of Jack Skinner" and "Nation of Twos"), clarinet (on "A Sip For Strength"), paranoia bass, kitchen utensil bashing, and blender molestation on "I'm OK If You're OK", chimes (on "The Man with the Plastic Penis"), final sequencing
- Andrew Huffstetler - lead and backing vocals, trombone (on "Bring Me the Head of Jack Skinner" and "A Sip For Strength")
- Kim Pendleton - backing vocals (on "A Sip For Strength")
- Dave Willingham - producer, mixer, final sequencing
- Paul Quigg - mixer ("Numb," "Bring Me the Head of Jack Skinner," "A Sip For Strength," and "Nation of Twos")
- Andy VanDette - mastering
- Todd Ramsell - album artwork
