= Sea Hags (album) =

Studio album by Sea Hags
- Released: April 1989
- Recorded: May–September 1988
- Studios: Rumbo (Canoga Park); Record Plant (Sausolito)
- Genres: Sleaze rock, hard rock, glam metal
- Length: 40:33
- Label: Chrysalis
- Producer: Mike Clink

Singles from Sea Hags
- 1. "Half the Way Valley" / "Back to the Grind" Released: July 31, 1989

Professional ratings
Review scores
Source	Rating
AllMusic	4.5/5 stars
Classic Rock	10/10
The Encyclopedia of Popular Music	3/5 stars
The Great Metal Discography	7/10
Kerrang!	4/5 stars
Metal Forces	90/100
Metal Hammer	5/5 stars
Raw	9/10
Rock Hard	6.5/10

Sea Hags is the only studio album by the American hard rock band Sea Hags. It was released in 1989 through Chrysalis Records. During recording, the band's line up changed several times as the label and the band did not think they were capable of producing the right sound. After the album was released, the band went on a European tour, where they promptly broke up.

The members had thoughts about reforming in 1991, but when bassist and founding member Chris Schlosshardt died of pneumonia, the band's fate was sealed. His death also contributed to the dissolution of another band, The Nymphs. That band's lead singer, Inger Lorre, was Schlosshardt's girlfriend, and she went back to New Jersey in the wake of his death.

The album was remastered and re-released in 2007 by Rock Candy with previously unreleased demos of "Doghouse" and "Half the Way Valley" and expanded liner notes.

== Track listing ==
All tracks are written by Ron Yocom and Chris Schlosshardt, except "Someday", by Brian Marnell.

No.	Title	Length
1.	"Half the Way Valley"	3:05
2.	"Doghouse"	4:28
3.	"Too Much T-Bone"	3:10
4.	"Someday" (SVT cover)	5:05
5.	"Back to the Grind"	4:17
6.	"Bunkbed Creek"	2:31
7.	"In the Mood for Love"	3:06
8.	"Miss Fortune"	4:24
9.	"All the Time"	3:41
10.	"Three's a Charm"	2:41
11.	"Under the Night Stars"	4:07
Total length:		40:33

2007 Rock Candy re-release
No.	Title	Length
12.	"Doghouse" (Demo)	5:06
13.	"Half the Way Valley" (Demo)	2:53

Notes

- All songs arranged by Sea Hags and Mike Clink.

== Personnel ==
Adapted from liner notes.

Sea Hags
- Ron Yocom – vocals, rhythm guitar
- Frankie Wilsey – lead guitar
- Chris Schlosshardt – bass guitar, vocals
- Adam Maples – drums

Additional personnel

- Kevin Russell – additional guitar

Artwork

- Rick Griffin – artwork
- Dave Heffernan – artwork
- Neil Zlozower – photography
Production
- Mike Clink – production (all), mixing (7, 8, 10, 11)
- Paul Lani – mixing (1–4, 6–10)
- Chris Lord-Alge – mixing (5)
- Dan Marnien – additional engineering, mixing assistant
- Andy Udoff – mixing assistant
- Ron Beaton – mixing assistant
- George Marino – mastering

Reissue

- Cürt Evans – design
- Greg Langston – archive photos
- John Astley – remastering

== Charts ==
Chart performance for Sea Hags
Chart (1989)	Peak position
UK Heavy Metal Albums (Music Week)	19
US Billboard 200	163
