= Face Down in Turpentine =

Studio album by Baboon
- Released: June 13, 1994
- Recorded: Resin Studios, Denton, Texas
- Genre: Grunge
- Length: 46:10
- Label: Grass
- Producers: Sam McCall, Baboon

Baboon chronology
Sausage (1992)	Face Down in Turpentine (1994)	The Numb E.P. (1996)

Professional ratings
Review scores
Source	Rating
Allmusic	(2/5)
CMJ	(favorable)

Face Down in Turpentine is the first studio album by the band Baboon. It was released on June 13, 1994, on Grass Records.

== Track listing ==
1. "Master Salvatoris" – 1:44
2. "Tool" – 4:05
3. "Step Away" – 3:53
4. "Good Friend" – 3:19
5. "Happy Life" – 2:40
6. "Positive" – 4:04
7. "Why'd You Say Die?" – 3:49
8. "Emotionless" – 3:20
9. "Thumbhead" – 1:57
10. "Sucker" – 4:02
11. "Kamikaze" – 1:55
12. "Naked in the Mall/California Dreaming" – 4:01
13. "Bright Lights Big Mommy" – 2:50
14. "E" – 4:31

All songs by Baboon.

== Personnel ==
- Steven Barnett - drums
- Andrew Huffstetler - vocals, trombone
- Bart Rogers - bass guitar, backing vocals
- Mike Rudnicki - guitar, backing vocals
- Sam McCall - producer
