= God Damn (band) =

British band

- Origin: Wolverhampton, England, UK
- Genre: Rock
- Years active: 2010–present
- Label: One Little Indian Records
- Members: Thom Edward; Ash Weaver
- Website: www.goddamnband.com

God Damn were a British rock band from Wolverhampton, England, formed in 2010.

== Career ==
The band formed in 2010 and were originally a three-piece, until the third member suffered life-threatening injuries in an accident; they are now performing as a duo. They signed to One Little Indian Records in 2014, and released an album named Vultures. Their sound combines 1970s hard rock with 1980s and 1990s grunge, among other influences. They cite influences including Nirvana, Melvins, Queens of the Stone Age, Selfish Cunt, and Butthole Surfers.

As of the release of Everything Ever in 2016, the band has been a 3-piece, with James Brown providing synthesizer and additional guitar/vocals.

The band has toured extensively, playing alongside groups such as Foo Fighters, Thrice, Red Fang, The Cribs, Slaves, and Wolf Alice. They have appeared at Reading and Leeds Festivals and at South by Southwest in Austin, Texas.

== Reception ==
Paul Lester wrote in The Guardian:

Influences cited in early reviews include Pixies, Bleach-period Nirvana and Jesus Lizard, which sounds about right. In fact, listening to their Heavy Money EP, with its elements of goth, grunge, death metal and more, it's tempting to see God Damn as offering a précis of rock styles past and present. [...] New single "Shoe Prints in the Dust" – their first for One Little Indian and recorded at Toe Rag studios with Liam Watson – is their best yet, a total riffy assault, sheer rampant sexnoise that is actually less grungey than groovy, but still heavy as fuck."

The Vultures album was described as being "capable of igniting a spark in your gut that’ll burn until there’s nothing left" by Line Of Best Fit.

Brum Notes Magazine described God Damn as being "colossal, monumental and gut-wrenchingly furious – Wolverhampton's God Damn make more noise with two people than most bands could manage with 20".

Metal Hammer regarded God Damn as being "a different matter: wickedly intense, relentlessly noisy and a million miles away from the polite fuzz rock of the modern era's most notable four-legged outfit (you know the one)".

== Band members ==
Members

- Thom Edward – lead vocals, guitar
- Ash Weaver – drums, percussion
- Hannah Al-Shemmeri - Keys
- Rob Graham - Keys, Additional Guitar, and vocals

Previous Members

- Dave Copson – guitar, vocals
- James Brown – synthesizer, guitar, additional vocals

== Discography ==
=== Studio albums ===
- Demonstration (2012)
- Vultures (2015)
- Everything Ever (2016)
- God Damn (2020)
- Raw Coward (2021)

=== EPs ===
- I'm a Lazer, You're a Radar (2013)
- Heavy Money (2013)

=== Singles ===
- "God Damn" (2012)
- "Shoe Prints in the Dust" (2014)
- "Horus" (2014)
- "When the Wind Blows" (2015)
