= Baboon (band) =

American rock band

- Origin: Denton, Texas, United States
- Genre: Rock
- Years active: 1991–present
- Labels: Grass, Wind-Up, Last Beat
- Members: Andrew Huffstetler; Mike Rudnicki; James Henderson; Bart Rogers; Steven Barnett
- Past members: Bryan Schmitz; Will Johnson; Mark Reznicek; Ben Burt; Matt Pence; Mark Hughes
- Website: baboonland.com (defunct)

Baboon is an American rock band originally from Denton, Texas. The band formed in 1991. Their fourth and final album, Baboon, was released in 2006.

Baboon appeared on an episode of Walker, Texas Ranger titled "Hall of Fame" in 1996. The band and their music were a key point in the episode's plot.

In its early years, Baboon, Brutal Juice, and Caulk were known collectively in the Denton area as the "Fraternity of Noise." Baboon toured extensively, including a stint on the Skoal-sponsored R.O.A.R. Tour in 1997, along with acts such as Iggy Pop, The Reverend Horton Heat, The Bloodhound Gang, Tonic, and Sponge. They also toured with Toadies, Brutal Juice, and Unwound.

Vocalist Andrew Huffstetler and guitarist Mike Rudnicki formed The Boom Boom Box in 2008 and released a self-titled EP later than year, and a full-length album, titled Until Your Eyes Get Used To The Darkness, through Kirtland Records in 2012.

== Band members ==
=== Current members ===
- Andrew Huffstetler - vocals, trombone
- Mike Rudnicki - guitar
- James Henderson - guitar (2003–present)
- Bart Rogers - bass (1991–1994, 2010–present)
- Steven Barnett - drums (1992–present)

=== Former members ===
- Bryan Schmitz - bass (1994–1995)
- Will Johnson - drums (1991–1992)
- Mark Reznicek - percussion, keyboard (2002)
- Mark Hughes - bass (1995–2008)

=== Former unofficial members ===
- Ben Burt - drums
- Matt Pence - drums

== Discography ==
=== Studio albums ===
- Face Down in Turpentine (1994)
- Secret Robot Control (1997)
- Something Good Is Going to Happen to You (2002)
- Baboon (2006)

=== Compilation albums ===
- A Bum Note and a Bead of Sweat (2001)

=== Singles / EPs / Demos ===
- ed Lobster (1991)
- Sausage (1992)
- Save Me (1993)
- Tool (1993)
- The Numb E.P. (1996)
- Halloween Sound FX (1996)
- The Kissing Song / King of the Damned Laser Gag! (1997)
- Free Sampler (1997)
- We Sing and Play (1999)

=== Compilations ===
| Year | Title | Song | Label |
|---|---|---|---|
| 1993 | Get It Through Your Thick Skull | "Tool" | Idol |
| 1993 | We're From Texas And You're Not | "Kamikaze" | Scratched |
| 1994 | Fry Street Fair '94 | "Happy Life" | VIP |
| 1994 | Winter '94 Sampler | "Sucker" | The Met |
| 1994 | Welcome to Hell's Lobby | "Bring Me the Head of Jack Skinner" | One Ton |
| 1995 | Fry Street Fair '95 | "Time Wounds All Heels" | VIP |
| 1996 | Sandy Does Dallas | "You're the One That I Want" | One Ton |
| 1996 | Superwinner's Summer Rock Academy | "Master Salvatoris" | St. Francis |
| 1996 | Coolidge 50 | "Texas, Our Texas" | Coolidge |
| 1997 | CMJ New Music Monthly - May 97 | "Night of the Long Knives" | CMJ |
| 1998 | Creative People Must Be Stopped | "Spoon Bender" | ? |
| 1998 | Scene, Heard Volume III | "Tidal Wave" | Dallas Observer |
| 2000 | 97.1 KEGL Local Show CD | "Mal De Mer" | KEGL 97.1 |
| 2001 | Buzz Oven Vol. 2 | "Lushlife," "Evil (live)" | Buzz Oven |
| 2003 | 13 Tracks Vol. 4 | "Alright" | Fossil Jeans |

== See also ==
- List of alternative rock artists
