= Crave (Cyclefly album) =

Studio album by Cyclefly
- Released: April 8, 2002
- Recorded: 2000 at Parkage Studios (East Sussex, England); 2001 at Totally Wired (Dublin, Ireland)
- Genres: Alternative metal; nu metal; alternative rock; psychedelic rock
- Labels: Radioactive Records; MCA Records
- Producers: Bill Appleberry/Tobias Miller; Colin Richardson

Cyclefly chronology
Generation Sap (1999)	Crave (2002)

Crave is the second album from the band Cyclefly, released on 8 April 2002.

The album, originally called Tales from the Fish Bowl, had a vote by fans to decide the album art.

== Reception ==
Professional ratings
Review scores
Source	Rating
Allmusic	3/5 stars
Music Reviewer	10.0/10

Andy Capper wrote an astonishingly scathing one-star review of the album in NME, decrying it as "a turgid, tuneless, completely crass piece of mix and match nu-metal" and describing the vocals as "whiny and useless", while also referring to fans of the nu metal genre as "wankers" and attacking them for being allegedly unintelligent and "easy to swindle".

A far less derisive review came from Harry Guerin, speaking from RTÉ, who highlighted the acoustic content of the record over the heavier material and expressed optimism in the band's future endeavours: "Crave is very much a case of a band with a work in progress sign hanging over their heads".

Greg Leos of Unearthed gave the album a positive review, stating that it "has enough texture, power and hunger to leave listeners wanting more".

== Track listing ==
No.	Title	Length
1.	"No Stress"	3:46
2.	"Karma Killer" (feat. Chester Bennington)	2:48
3.	"Sellophane Fixtures"	3:13
4.	"Crave"	4:00
5.	"Drive"	3:48
6.	"Crowns"	4:17
7.	"Lost Opinion"	3:35
8.	"King for a Day"	4:12
9.	"Fallen Wishes"	3:26
10.	"Bulletproof"	3:07
11.	"Tales from the Fishbowl" (feat. Sacha Puttnam)	4:53

Bonus tracks
No.	Title	Length
12.	"Weary"	4:05
13.	"Accidental Ornaments"	3:01

=== Outtakes ===
- "Five Years" (David Bowie cover) - 6:03 (Blockbuster: A 70's Glitter Glam Rock Experience compilation)
- "Small Idols" - 3:04 (No Stress single)
- "Karma Killer (Bill Appleberry Mix)" - 2:47 (Released on the band's MySpace page)
- "Crave (Sacha Puttnam & Ciaran O'Shea Remix)" - 4:00 (Released on the band's MySpace page)
- "Middle Class" - 4:07 (Unreleased)
- "Sufficate" (Unreleased)
- "World Idiot" (Unreleased)
- "Wormholes" - 3:49 (Unreleased)
- "Angelgrace" (Unreleased)
- "Slaves To The Sunshine" (Unreleased)
- "Revolver" - 3:14 (Unreleased)
- "Tranquillity" (Unreleased)
- "A Perfect Feeling" (Unreleased)

== Personnel ==
Cyclefly

- Declan O'Shea - vocals, arrangement
- Ciaran O'Shea - guitar, arrangement
- NoNo Presta - guitar, arrangement
- Christian Montagne - bass, arrangement
- Jean-Michel Cavallo - drums, arrangement

Additional musicians

- Chester Bennington - vocals (track 2)
- Sacha Puttnam - strings, organ (track 11), arrangement (tracks 2, 7)

Technical personnel

- Robert Flynt - photography
- Sasha Jankovic - engineer
- Alan Sanderson - engineer
- Ian Blanch - engineer
- Jeff Rothschild - engineer
- Ciaran O'Shea - programming
- David Bianco - mixing
- Bill Appleberry - producer (tracks 1, 4, 5), engineer
- Colin Richardson - producer
- Tobias Miller - producer (tracks 1, 4, 5), engineer

== Release history ==
Region	Date
United Kingdom	April 8, 2002
United States	April 9, 2002
