= Something Good Is Going to Happen to You =

Studio album by Baboon
- Released: October 31, 2002
- Recorded: Last Beat Studios and The Paper House
- Genre: Rock and roll
- Length: 40:51
- Label: Last Beat
- Producer: Baboon, John Congleton

Baboon chronology
A Bum Note and a Bead of Sweat (2001)	Something Good Is Going to Happen to You (2002)	Baboon (2006)

Professional ratings
Review scores
Source	Rating
Austin Chronicle	link
Fort Worth Star-Telegram	favorable link
Dallas Observer	favorable link
Fort Worth Weekly	favorable link

Something Good Is Going to Happen to You is an album by Baboon, released in 2002 on Last Beat Records.

== Track listing ==
All tracks are written by Baboon, except where noted.

No.	Title	Length
1.	"Alright"	2:32
2.	"Crash"	2:25
3.	"Carried"	4:55
4.	"Evil"	3:41
5.	"Son"	5:16
6.	"Too Handsome to Die" (Steven Barnett)	1:26
7.	"King of the Damned Laser Gag"	2:47
8.	"Leave Me Be"	2:42
9.	"Secret Room"	4:06
10.	"Vampirate"	3:10
11.	"Pig Latin"	3:29
12.	"Goodnight, Good-bye"	4:22

== Personnel ==
- Steven Barnett - drums, keyboards, fan-blade guitar, e-bow bass, room evacuator (R.E.1), piano, organ, author and sole-performer ("Too Handsome to Die")
- Andrew Huffstetler - lead vocals
- Mark Hughes - bass, backing vocals, keyboards
- Michael Rudnicki - electric and acoustic guitars, backing vocals, keyboards
- Sean Kirkpatrick - piano (on "Goodnight, Good-bye")
- Regina Chellaw - trumpet (on "Goodnight, Good-bye")
- John Congleton - producer, engineer
- Rob Wechsler - mastering
- Chris Paluska - design and layout
- Todd Ramsell - design and layout
