= Mt. Helium =

American rock band

Background information
- Also known as: The Apex Theory (1999–2004)
- Origin: Los Angeles, California, U.S.
- Genres: Progressive rock; alternative rock; alternative metal; nu metal (early)
- Years active: 1999–2008
- Labels: DreamWorks; Toys of the Masses
- Past members: David Hakopyan; Art Karamian; Ontronik "Andy" Khachaturian; Sammy J. Watson

Mt. Helium, formerly known as the Apex Theory, was an American rock band from Los Angeles, California, that was known for playing Mediterranean music mixed with progressive rock. The band released three studio albums and three extended plays.

== History ==
The Apex Theory was formed in 1999 by Armenian-American musicians Ontronik "Andy" Khachaturian, David Hakopyan (drummer and bass player of Soil / System of a Down respectively), and Art Karamian following Khachaturian's injury and subsequent departure from System of a Down. Sammy J. Watson joined the band after they were unable to find a committed drummer. The band released its first extended play, Extendemo, in 2000. The following year, they signed with DreamWorks Records, releasing their second EP The Apex Theory on October 9, 2001. The band performed at the main stage during the 2001 Warped Tour, and as co-headliners at the 2002 MTV2 tour.

On April 2, 2002, the band released its first album, Topsy-Turvy. It peaked at No. 6 on the Billboard Heatseekers chart and No. 157 on the Billboard 200. Months after the album's release, Khachaturian left the band, and they began to audition new vocalists before deciding that Karamian would take over as the band's vocalist, shifting the band from a quartet to a power trio. The band released an EP in 2004 entitled inthatskyissomethingwatching. After changing the name to Mt. Helium, the band released its second album, Faces, as a digital download on June 3, 2008.

== Musical style ==
Former vocalist Ontronik Khachaturian described the band's sound as a "heavy Mediterranean groove". The Michigan Daily writer Sonya Sutherland wrote, "The Apex Theory combines a heavy drum support, melodic guitars and honey sweet vocals to provide an entertaining and emotional message." The band's musical style was influenced by Mediterranean, Middle Eastern and Near Eastern music. PopMatters described Topsy-Turvy as "an energy-filled fusion of progressive and modern rock."

The MTV News writer Jon Wiederhorn wrote that "the Apex Theory's multi-textured music [...] combines metal, prog-rock, Mediterranean music and even jazz. And the off-kilter rhythm, skittering drums, whirlpool guitars and aggressive vocals of 'Shhh ... (Hope Diggy)' are a perfect taster for the band's debut album". Deseret News said that "Apex Theory's progressive punk mixed exotic music signatures with psychedelic rock". As The Apex Theory, they were also labelled nu metal.

== Band members ==
- David Hakopyan — bass guitar (1999–2008)
- Art Karamian — guitar, vocals (1999–2008)
- Ontronik "Andy" Khachaturian — vocals (1999–2002)
- Sammy J. Watson — drums (1999–2008)

== Discography ==
=== Albums ===
- Topsy-Turvy (2002) (as The Apex Theory)
- Faces (2008) (as Mt. Helium)

=== Extended plays ===
- Extendemo (2000) (as The Apex Theory)
- The Apex Theory (2001) (as The Apex Theory)
- Inthatskyissomethingwatching (2004) (as The Apex Theory)
- Lightpost (2007) (as The Apex Theory)

=== Promotional releases ===
- Random Bursts (2001) (as The Apex Theory)
