= Ontronik =

American musician (born 1975)

- Also known as: Andy Khachaturian
- Born: Antranik Khachaturian; May 4, 1975 (age 51); Los Angeles, California, U.S.
- Genres: Electronica; alternative rock; progressive rock; alternative metal; nu metal; house
- Occupations: Musician; producer; DJ
- Instruments: Drums; vocals; turntables; keyboards
- Years active: 1994–present
- Member of: OnTroniK
- Formerly of: System of a Down; The Apex Theory; VoKee; KillMatriarch

Antranik Khachaturian (born May 4, 1975) also known as Andy Khachaturian or artistically as Ontronik (stylized as OnTroniK), is an American musician, producer and DJ. He is known for being the original drummer (1994–1997) of the metal band System of a Down and founder/lead vocalist (1999–2002) of the alt-progressive rock band The Apex Theory, as well as a member of his band VoKee. He was also the founder, drummer, keyboardist, and backing vocalist of KillMatriarch (2010–2012) and currently is working on his solo project, OnTronik.

== History ==
=== System of a Down ===
Ontronik was born to Armenian parents (Martin and Asdghik Khachaturian) in Los Angeles, California. He met Daron Malakian and Shavo Odadjian in high school. He then met Serj Tankian when they decided in 1994 to form the band System of a Down. Together, they recorded a demo titled "Untitled 1995 Demo" and "Demo Tape 1". In 1996, they recorded "Demo Tape 2" and "Demo Tape 3" and in 1997, recorded "Demo Tape 4". In 1997, after spending three years with System of a Down, Khachaturian had to leave the band due to an injury inflicted while practicing Jeet Kune Do after punching a hole in the wall and breaking every bone in his hand. He was replaced by John Dolmayan, the current drummer of System of a Down.

=== The Apex Theory, VoKee, KillMatriarch and DJ stage ===
In 1998, Khachaturian, with Art Karamian, David Hakopyan and Sammy J. Watson, decided to form the band The Apex Theory, bringing to market two music albums and an EP. In 2002, he left the band because of musical differences. After leaving The Apex Theory, Khachaturian formed a rock band in 2004 with a group of friends, called VoKee. In 2010, he co-founded the industrial rock trio KillMatriarch and produced the first EP titled "Order Through Chaos". In 2012, the band disbanded and currently, Khachaturian is working in Los Angeles on his OnTronik solo project.

=== Bands ===
Band	Position	Start date	End date
System of a Down	Co-founder/Drums	1994	1997
The Apex Theory	Founder/Vocalist	1999	November 2002
VoKee	Founder/Guitar and Vocals	2004	–
KillMatriarch	Founder/Keyboards/Drums and backing Vocals	2010	2012

== Discography ==
=== System of a Down ===
- Untitled 1995 Demo (1995)
- Demo Tape 1 (1995)
- Demo Tape 2 (1996)
- Demo Tape 3 (1997)
- Demo Tape 4 (1997)

=== The Apex Theory ===
- Extendemo (EP) (2000)
- The Apex Theory (EP) (2001)
- Topsy-Turvy (2002)

=== KillMatriarch ===
- Order Through Chaos (EP) (2010)
