= Baboon (album) =

Studio album by Baboon
- Released: October 10, 2006
- Recorded: Juniper Music and Sound Design
- Genre: Rock and roll
- Length: 54:07
- Label: ed Lobster Music
- Producer: Baboon

Baboon chronology
something good is going to happen to you (2002)	Baboon (2006)

Professional ratings
Review scores
Source	Rating
The Tripwire	favorable

Baboon is an album by Baboon. It was self-released in 2006. All songs were written by Baboon.

== Track listing ==
1. "Airplane" – 4:31
2. "Breaking Glass" – 4:26
3. "Saturday" – 4:06
4. "Dracula Eyes" – 4:48
5. "Arms Around the World" – 4:59
6. "Into the Sea" – 2:33
7. "Light of the Lightning Strike" – 3:56
8. "Surround" – 5:32
9. "Accidents Are Waiting to Happen" – 3:19
10. "Circles" – 4:37
11. "Waiting for the Rain" – 4:31
12. "Can't Be Wrong" – 6:49

All songs by Baboon.

== Personnel ==
- Steven Barnett - drums
- James Henderson - guitar, backing vocals, keyboards
- Andrew Huffstetler - lead vocals
- Mark Hughes - bass, backing vocals
- Mike Rudnicki - guitar, backing vocals
- Rob Wechsler - mastering
- Baboon - cover concept
- Darren Paul - art direction
- Danna Berger (Band) - photography
- Tim Becker - photography
- D. Muller - photography
- Nellie Buir - photography
- Nic Taylor - photography
- Dimitris Kritsotakis - photography
- Kenn Kiser - photography
- Rikard Sigvardsson - photography
