= Lollipop Lust Kill =

American nu metal band

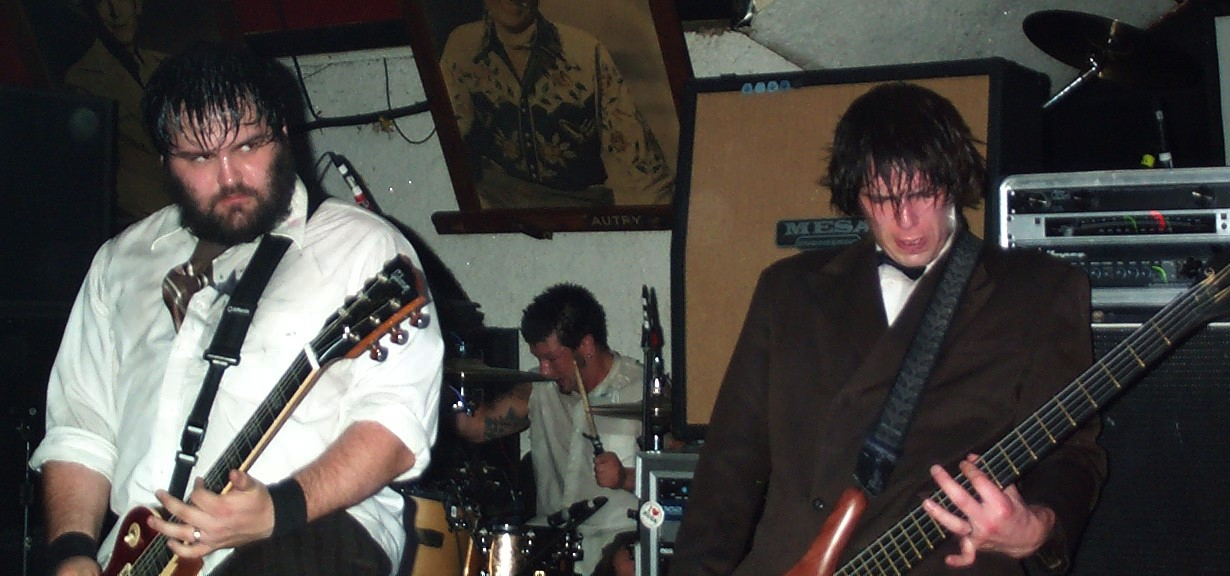

Background information
- Origin: Toledo, Ohio
- Genres: Nu metal
- Years active: 1996–2020
- Labels: Murder Rock; Artemis
- Past members: Deadgreg; Pill; Knits; Evvy Pedder; Dhuman; Killer K
- Website: Official MySpace site

Lollipop Lust Kill was an American nu metal band, formed in 1996 in Toledo, Ohio.

== Band history ==
Lollipop Lust Kill was formed in 1996 in Toledo, Ohio with the original line-up including DeadGreg, Dr. Distorto, Evvy Pedder, D. Human, and drummer Bloody Sunday.

In 1998, Lollipop Lust Kill were finalists in Toledo WBUZ radio's "Buzz Band Showdown", earning them a spot on WBUZ's second local artist CD and opening a radio showcase concert, Buzzfest '98, with another Toledo-based band, Sugar Buzz. Performers included just-signed Kid Rock, Sevendust, Candlebox, Caroline's Spine, Fuel and Stabbing Westward.

In 2000, Lollipop Lust Kill self-released their full-length debut, Motel Murder Madness. Their major label debut, My So Called Knife, was produced by Sylvia Massy and recorded in Weed, California. Massy is known for her work with Tool, System of a Down, Prince and Johnny Cash. The album featured a heavy rock remake of Depeche Mode's song "Personal Jesus". It was released by Artemis Records in June 2002, but the album was met with mediocre sales.

In February 2004, Knits left Lollipop Lust Kill. In March 2004, guitarist DeadGreg and bassist D. human announced their departure from the band, citing personal reasons. Keyboardist Killer K. would follow suit a few weeks later. The band auditioned several potential replacement bassists before settling on Jay Jay and guitarist Brian Tilse, formerly of Rob Halford's outfit Fight. The reformed band attempted to write and record a follow-up to My So Called Knife for several months, before deciding to call it quits in June 2004. Jay Jay and Tilse proceeded to start the band Glass Pipe Suicide with Knits, and they recorded some demos which were made available for free online before disbanding sometime in 2005.

LLK played their final show at the popular Toledo venue Headliners on June 5, 2004.

Notably, LLK toured with Coal Chamber, American Head Charge, Ministry, Motograter, Dog Fashion Disco and Kittie.

Three members (DeadGreg, Pill, and Knits) agreed to start a new band, called They Thought We Were Strangers, and played together for the first time since the farewell show in 2004. On January 27, 2011, the group released a 4-song EP available for download.

== Albums ==
- 1997: Candycanes and Razorblades (EP)
- 2000: Motel Murder Madness
- 2002: My So Called Knife
