= Lightpost (EP) =

EP by The Apex Theory
- Released: January 16, 2007
- Genre: Progressive rock
- Length: 15:25
- Label: Toys of the Masses
- Producer: The Apex Theory

Mt. Helium chronology
| Topsy-Turvy (2002) | Lightpost (2007) | Faces (2008) |

Lightpost is the third extended play by American rock band Mt. Helium, formerly The Apex Theory. Released as a digital download on January 16, 2007, it is the band's first release as a power trio.

== Track listing ==
| No. | Title | Length |
|---|---|---|
| 1. | "Lightpost": 1. "Awkward Nerve" (3:25); 2. "Ambient Romance" (2:35); 3. "Audition" (3:13); 4. "NineEleven" (2:35); 5. "Good Luck" (3:36)" | 15:25 |

== Personnel ==
The Apex Theory

- Art Karamian – vocals, guitar
- Dave Hakopyan – bass
- Sammy J. Watson – drums
