= Brutal Juice =

American acid punk band

- Brutal Juice Promotional Photograph. L-R: Sam McCall, Ted Wood, Craig Welch, Ben Burt and Gordon Gibson.

Background information
- Origin: Denton, Texas
- Genres: Acid punk
- Years active: 1991–1997, 2012–present
- Labels: Homus Boyus, Alternative Tentacles, Interscope
- Members: Craig Welch; Gordon Gibson; Sam McCall; Ted Wood; Ben Burt

Brutal Juice is an American acid punk band from Denton, Texas. The band formed in 1990 and officially disbanded in February 1997, although they held several reunion concerts between 1999 and 2012, which usually took place at Fry Street Fair in Denton. They officially reformed in 2012 and released their latest album, titled "Welcome to the Panopticon," on October 28, 2016. Brutal Juice still performs a few times a year, typically playing shows in the Dallas-Fort Worth metroplex, or in Austin.

== History ==
The band was formed by singer/guitarist Gordon Gibson and drummer Ben Burt, who added classical/jazz-trained guitarist Ted Wood, and later Sam McCall (bass guitar, who had recorded the band's early demos prior to joining the group) after their first three bassists had come and gone, this lineup recording the How Tasty Was My Little Timmy? tape before Craig Welch joined, initially as a dancer, but soon becoming co-vocalist. They took the name Brutal Juice, which according to some sources was taken from a Hertz commercial featuring O. J. Simpson and Arnold Palmer, although promotional material supplied with the release of Mutilation Makes Identification Difficult claimed "they had the stupid name [Brutal Juice] before the stupid O. J. stuff".

Over the next two years the band released singles "Cannibal Holocaust" and "Black Moment Of Panic", and in 1994 they released the live album I Love the Way They Scream When They Die on Alternative Tentacles/Sound Virus.

The band's first studio album proper, Mutilation Makes Identification Difficult, was released in 1995 after the band had signed to Interscope Records. It was described by Patrick Kennedy in his Allmusic review as "a positively brilliant, sprawling construction of punk rock fury, prog mathematics, spacey, tripped out leads and effects, and densely churning metal riffs". Mark Jenkins, for The Washington Post, described the songs as "cannily structured and sometimes even catchy".

They were dropped by Interscope, and released the "All American City" single on the Man's Ruin label in June 1996, before splitting in 1997.

The band toured extensively throughout the 1990s, opening for bands such as Toadies, Gwar and Ed Hall. Brutal Juice also toured with Neurosis, Baboon, Alice Donut, and The Meatmen.

Vocalist Craig Welch was known for his on-stage antics, often standing on his head and putting out cigarettes on his tongue or forehead during the band's performances. This habit led to his next band taking the name International Sparkdome.

Brutal Juice had a habit of writing songs that incorporate their album titles. Even their earliest recordings employed this. How Tasty Was My Little Timmy? is a line from the song "Cannibal Holocaust", which appears on their first release. Similarly, I Love the Way They Scream When They Die is a line from "Burpgun", which appears on the release that followed it. Likewise, Mutilation Makes Identification Difficult is a lyric from "Bound For Glory", which first appeared on a single that was released a year after the album with that title.

Jim Green, writing for Trouser Press, described the band's music as "like a steamroller massage but includes irregular time signatures and unusual chord progressions".

After the band dissolved in 1997, the members of Brutal Juice remained active in the music scene. Gordon Gibson and Ben Burt went on to form The Tomorrowpeople, along with ex-Toadies guitarist Darrel Herbert. Ben Burt also played in the bands Pinkston, Falkon, Jack With One Eye, and most recently Five Dollar Priest in New York City. Craig Welch played with International Sparkdome, Fabulous Badasses, Neeks, 2MAI, Wounded Infidel, The Banes, Dead Cow Mountain, FISK, Glitterature and now has his solo project Foolish2. Ted Wood played with Hand of Onan, The Banes, Clutch Cargo, Magnum Octopus, and Austin-based band Babydick (along with Sam McCall). Sam McCall also produced and recorded albums for other bands.

The band played several local shows from 2000 onwards, and formally reformed in 2012, and began to work on new material. Their most recent album, the David Icke-inspired Welcome to the Panopticon, was self-released in late 2016, described by Welch as "an acid-fueled excuse to turn amps to 11 and play with feedback loops", and by Michael Toland of the Austin Chronicle as "a distinctive mélange of fantastical indulgence and political commentary".

Wesley Willis wrote a song about Brutal Juice after seeing them perform in New York City. It appears on his 1996 album Fabian Road Warrior.

== Band members ==
- Craig Welch - lead vocals
- Gordon Gibson - lead vocals, guitar
- Sam McCall - bass
- Ted Wood - guitar, vocals
- Ben Burt - drums, vocals

== Discography ==
=== Albums ===
- How Tasty Was My Little Timmy? (1991), Homus Boyus
- I Love the Way They Scream When They Die (1994), Alternative Tentacles
- Mutilation Makes Identification Difficult (1995), Interscope
- Welcome to the Panopticon (2016), Homus Boyus

=== Singles / E.P.s / demos ===
- Brutal Juice (demo) (1992), Homus Boyus
- "Cannibal Holocaust" (1992), Direct Hit
- "Black Moment of Panic" (1993), Alternative Tentacles
- "All American City" (1996), Man's Ruin

=== Compilation appearances ===
Year	Title	Song	Label
1993	Get It Through Your Thick Skull	"Eastern Cat"	Idol Records
1993	Tales from the Edge Vol. 7	"Cannibal Holocaust"	KDGE FM
1993	We're from Texas	"Pull the Plug"	Scratched Records
1994	Welcome to Hell's Lobby	"Cannibal Holocaust"	One Ton
1994	The Futility of a Well Ordered Life	"Galaxy"	Alternative Tentacles
1996	Show and Tell: A Stormy Remembrance of TV Themes	"Paid Programming" ("I'd Like to Teach the World to Sing") "Bewitched" (theme song)	Which?
