= System of a Down (album) =

Studio album by System of a Down
- Released: June 30, 1998
- Studios: Sound City (Van Nuys); The Mansion (Hollywood)
- Genres: Nu metal; alternative metal
- Length: 40:36
- Labels: American; Columbia
- Producers: Rick Rubin; System of a Down

System of a Down chronology
System of a Down (1998)	Toxicity (2001)

Singles from System of a Down
- 1. "Sugar" Released: May 24, 1998; 2. "Spiders" Released: February 10, 1999

System of a Down is the debut studio album by the American heavy metal band System of a Down, released on June 30, 1998, by American Recordings and Columbia Records. The album was certified Gold by the Recording Industry Association of America in February 2000. After the success of the band's following album, Toxicity (2001), System of a Down was certified platinum and has since gone double platinum.

In 2022, Eli Enis of Revolver included the song "Suite-Pee" in his list of the "10 Heaviest Nu-Metal Songs of All Time". In 2025, Rae Lemeshow-Barooshian of Loudwire included the album in her list of "the top 50 nu-metal albums of all time", ranking it eleventh.

== Music and lyrics ==
The album is generally considered nu metal and alternative metal, frequently utilizing low guitar tunings such as drop C. The song "Suite-Pee" is a criticism of pedophilia within the Catholic Church and religious extremism. "Sugar" is about the world's population's over use and reliance on drugs and other substances, as well as the predatory state of media like the news, while "P.L.U.C.K" is about the Armenian genocide.

== Artwork ==
John Heartfield's poster inspired the album cover for the album.

The cover artwork is from a 1928 anti-fascist poster designed by visual artist John Heartfield for the Communist Party of Germany. The text on the original poster translates as: "A hand has 5 fingers! With these 5 grab the enemy!" This slogan inspired part of the text contained on the back of the album: "The hand has five fingers, capable and powerful, with the ability to destroy as well as create". Later, it is written in bold letters: "Open your eyes, open your mouths, close your hands and make a fist." Serj Tankian later reused the phrase in the song "Uneducated Democracy" from his 2012 album Harakiri.

== Reception ==
Professional ratings
Review scores
Source	Rating
AllMusic	4/5 stars
Chronicles of Chaos	8/10
Drowned in Sound	10/10
Kerrang!	5/5 stars
Pitchfork	7.5/10
Q	4/5 stars
The Rolling Stone Album Guide	4/5 stars

System of a Down received acclaim from music critics. Q called it "an excellent starting point for this most curious band".

The album is featured in the book 1001 Albums You Must Hear Before You Die. Loudwire included the album in its list of The Best Metal Debut Albums, at number 22.

== Track listing ==
=== Original release ===
All lyrics are written by Serj Tankian, except "CUBErt" co-written by Daron Malakian; all music is composed by Malakian, except where noted.

No.	Title	Music	Length
1.	"Suite-Pee"		2:32
2.	"Know"	Shavo Odadjian, Malakian, Tankian	2:56
3.	"Sugar"	Odadjian, Malakian	2:33
4.	"Suggestions"		2:44
5.	"Spiders"		3:35
6.	"DDevil"	Odadjian, Malakian	1:43
7.	"Soil"		3:25
8.	"War?"		2:40
9.	"Mind"	Odadjian, Malakian, Tankian	6:16
10.	"Peephole"		4:04
11.	"CUBErt"		1:49
12.	"Darts"		2:42
13.	"P.L.U.C.K." (Politically Lying, Unholy, Cowardly Killers)		3:37
Total length:			40:36

Japanese edition bonus tracks
No.	Title	Length
14.	"Marmalade"	3:00
15.	"Störagéd"	1:19
Total length:		44:57

=== Limited edition bonus CD ===
No.	Title	Music	Length
1.	"Sugar" (Live from Irving Plaza, New York, Jan 19, 1999)	Odadjian, Malakian	2:27
2.	"War?" (Live from Irving Plaza, New York, Jan 19, 1999)		2:48
3.	"Suite-Pee" (Live from Irving Plaza, New York, Jan 19, 1999)		2:58
4.	"Know" (Live from Irving Plaza, New York, Jan 19, 1999)	Odadjian, Malakian, Tankian	3:04
Total length:			13:17

Notes

- "Marmalade" was included on most international CDs of System of a Down, while "Storaged" was exlusive to the Japanese CD.
- In 2025, "Marmalade" was placed onto digital deluxe editons of the album.

An early version of "X" from Toxicity was originally recorded for this album.

- The songs "Honey" and "Temper" from Demo Tape 2 were also recorded for this album but ultimately did not make the cut. The re-recorded versions of these songs have yet to surface anywhere.

== Personnel ==
All personnel credits for System of a Down are adapted from the album's liner notes.

System of a Down

- Daron Malakian – guitars, background vocals
- Serj Tankian – vocals, keyboards, samples
- Shavo Odadjian – bass
- John Dolmayan – drums

Production

- Rick Rubin – production; extra piano
- System of a Down – production, art direction
- D. Sardy – mixing, additional recording, finishing touches
- Sylvia Massy – engineering
- Greg Fidelman – engineering, assistant engineer
- Sam Storey – assistant engineer
- Nick Raskulinecz – assistant engineer
- James Saez – assistant mixdown engineer
- Greg Gordon – assistant mixdown engineer
- Andy Haller – assistant mixdown engineer
- Bryan Davis – second assistant mixdown engineer
- Eric "Statik" Anest – extra noise
- Vlado Meller – mastering

Creative personnel

- Anthony Artiaga – photography
- John Heartfield – cover art
- Frank Harkins – art direction

Studios

- Recorded at Sound City, Van Nuys, California
- Vocals and additional recordings at Akademie Mathematique of Philosophical Sound Research, Hollywood, California
- Mixed at Record Plant Studios, Hollywood, California & Hollywood Sound, California
- Mastered at Sony Studios, New York City

== Charts ==
=== Weekly charts ===
Chart (1998)	Peak position
Australian Albums (ARIA)	48
Dutch Albums (Album Top 100)	68
UK Albums (OCC)	103
US Billboard 200	124
US Top Heatseekers (Billboard)	1

Chart (2002–2026)	Peak position
US Billboard 200	113
US Top Rock Albums (Billboard)	17
US Top Alternative Albums (Billboard)	9
US Top Hard Rock Albums (Billboard)	7
US Tastemaker Albums (Billboard)	19

=== Year-end charts ===
Chart (2002)	Position
Canadian Albums (Billboard)	180
Canadian Alternative Albums (Billboard)	58
Canadian Metal Albums (Billboard)	28

== Certifications ==
Certifications for System of a Down
Region	Certification	Certified units/sales
Brazil (Pro-Música Brasil)	Platinum	40,000^{*}
Canada (Music Canada)	Gold	50,000^{^}
Italy (FIMI) sales since 2009	Gold	25,000^{‡}
United Kingdom (BPI)	Platinum	300,000^{‡}
United States (RIAA)	2× Platinum	2,000,000^{‡}
^{*} Sales figures based on certification alone.^{^} Shipments figures based on certification alone.^{‡} Sales+streaming figures based on certification alone.
