= Spiders (System of a Down song) =

Single by System of a Down

from the album System of a Down and Scream 3: The Album
- Released: 1999
- Studio: Sound City Studios, Van Nuys; Akademie Mathematique of Philosophical Sound Research Studios, Hollywood
- Genre: Alternative metal
- Length: 3:35
- Label: American
- Composer: Daron Malakian
- Lyricist: Serj Tankian
- Producers: Rick Rubin; System of a Down

System of a Down singles chronology
"Sugar" (1998)	"Spiders" (1999)	"Chop Suey!" (2001)

Music video
- “Spiders” on YouTube

"Spiders" is a song by the American heavy metal band System of a Down released as the second single from their self-titled debut album. It peaked at 38 on the Alternative Airplay chart and 25 on the Billboard Mainstream Rock chart.

The song was on the soundtrack for the movie Scream 3 and was briefly featured in the film itself. It was also used in the video game Rock Band 4.

== Music ==
"Spiders", like many of System of a Down's songs, is written in the key of C minor. The song relies heavily on the Cm, B♭, and E♭ chords, as well as Fm, Gm, A♭, B, and D♭. "Spiders" uses 4/4 time at a slow tempo, and employs drum-rolls and syncopation in the verses. The music can be described as haunting, ominous, dark, frightening, and depressing with its dark melody and echoing vocal overdubs. Serj Tankian's vocals, while low and melodic in the verses, become more energetic and dissonant in the refrains. The song's minor-key intro serves as a musical motif for the rest of the song; it repeats throughout the song in its normal and raised third forms. After the second refrain, Daron Malakian delivers a solo bridge that creates harmonic tension with its B and D♭ (non-key) chords. The song ends with a soft vocal version of the intro motif.

== Track listing ==
No.	Title	Lyrics	Music	Length
1.	"Spiders"	Serj Tankian	Daron Malakian	3:35

== Charts ==
Chart (1999–2000)	Peak position
US Alternative Airplay (Billboard)	38
US Mainstream Rock (Billboard)	25

== Certifications ==
Certifications for "Spiders"
Region	Certification	Certified units/sales
New Zealand (RMNZ)	Gold	15,000^{‡}
^{‡} Sales+streaming figures based on certification alone.
