= They Say =

They Say may refer to:

- "They Say" (jazz standard), a 1938 song recorded by Teddy Wilson, Artie Shaw, and others
- "They Say It's Wonderful", a 1946 song by Irving Berlin from the musical Annie Get Your Gun
- "They Say" (Scars on Broadway song), a 2008 song by the band Scars on Broadway
