= Addicted to the Violence =

Studio album by Daron Malakian and Scars on Broadway
- Released: July 18, 2025
- Genre: Alternative metal
- Length: 36:37
- Label: Scarred for Life
- Producer: Daron Malakian

Daron Malakian and Scars on Broadway chronology
Dictator (2018)	Addicted to the Violence (2025)

Singles from Addicted to the Violence
- 1. "Killing Spree" Released: June 6, 2025; 2. "Destroy the Power" Released: July 11, 2025

Addicted to the Violence is the third studio album by American rock band Daron Malakian and Scars on Broadway, released by Scarred for Life Records, on July 18, 2025, Malakian's 50th birthday.

== Background and promotion ==
Daron Malakian was responsible for composing, producing, and playing almost all of the musical instruments, with contributions from multi-instrumentalist Orbel Babayan, drummer Roman Lomtadze, and saxophonist Matthew "Narducci" Silberman.

In October 2024, the band performed twice in California, their first performances since 2019. Following these shows, Malakian revealed that the band's third album was already recorded and awaiting release, with plans to release the material by mid-2025.

Daron Malakian and Scars on Broadway announced their third album Addicted to the Violence on June 6, 2025, and would be released on July 18, 2025. The first single from the album, "Killing Spree", was released the same day. On July 11, the band released the second single, "Destroy the Power".

== Reception ==
The online magazine Metallerium gave Addicted to the Violence an 8/10, stating that it "proves that this man (Malakian) has plenty of material to go on and can continue to explore ideas that few have noticed in System of a Down's recent albums, and that at the same time gives him an endless career in this industry that can continue to await more good albums."

Kerrang! magazine gave it a 4/5 rating, calling it "an album brimming with energy, atmosphere, and melody."

Ghost Cult magazine gave it a rating of 8/10. "If you're a fan of System of a Down, this is the next best thing. This album is packed with powerful songs that are worth listening to."

== Track listing ==
Track listing adapted from the iTunes Store. All songs written by Daron Malakian except where noted.

No.	Title	Writer(s)	Length
1.	"Killing Spree"		2:46
2.	"Satan Hussein"		3:06
3.	"Done Me Wrong"	Malakian, Orbel Babayan	3:01
4.	"The Shame Game"		5:16
5.	"Destroy the Power"	Malakian, Babayan	3:56
6.	"Your Lives Burn"		1:57
7.	"Imposter"	Malakian, Babayan	3:16
8.	"You Destroy You"		3:18
9.	"Watch That Girl"		4:32
10.	"Addicted to the Violence"	Malakian, Babayan	5:29
Total length:			36:37

== Personnel ==
Credits adapted from the album's liner notes.

=== Daron Malakian and Scars on Broadway ===
- Daron Malakian – vocals, guitars, bass, production
- Orbel Babayan – engineering (all tracks), keyboard (tracks 3, 4, 10), organ (3, 4), mandolin (5, 8), clean guitars (7, 10), bass (8, 10), piano (8)
- Roman Lomtadze – drums

=== Additional contributors ===
- Ryan Williams – engineering, mixing
- Vlado Meller – mastering
- Jeremy Lubsey – mastering
- Peter Cho – mastering
- Vartan Malakian – front and back cover art
- Matthew "Narducci" Silberman – saxophone (10)

== Charts ==
Chart performance for Addicted to the Violence
Chart (2025)	Peak position
Swiss Albums (Schweizer Hitparade)	84
UK Album Downloads (Official Charts)	71
