= Drop D tuning =

Alternative form of guitar tuning

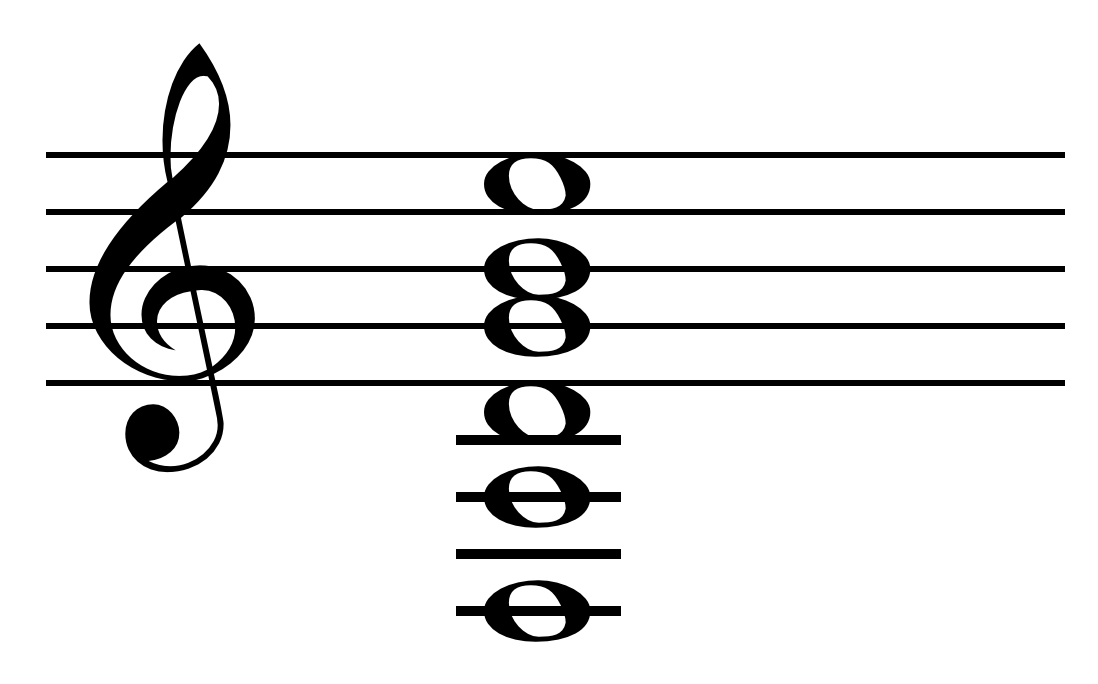
Drop D tuning

Drop D tuning is an alternative form of guitar tuning in which the lowest (sixth) string is tuned down from the usual E of standard tuning by one whole step to D. Therefore, where the standard tuning is E_{2}A_{2}D_{3}G_{3}B_{3}E_{4} (EADGBe), drop D is D_{2}A_{2}D_{3}G_{3}B_{3}E_{4} (DADGBe). Drop D tuning, as well as other lowered altered tunings, are often used with the electric guitar in heavy metal music. It is also used in blues, country, folk (often with acoustic guitar), and classical guitar.

"D5 Power Chord"
A D5 power chord played in Drop D tuning on an electric guitar played with a distortion effect

== Uses ==
In drop D, the three open bass strings form a D5 power chord. Other fifth chords are made when barred with the index finger of the fretting hand shifted up the fretboard. Drop D tuning is frequently used in heavy metal and its various subgenres, as guitarists in these styles often need fast transitions between power chords. Drop D is also used in metal because it adds two lower semitones to the bass range of the rhythm guitar, which adds two more low-range power chords (E♭ and D) and enables a heavier, deeper sound. The tuning has also been used in many other styles of music, including blues, country, folk, and classical. Due to its similarity to standard tuning, drop D is recognised as a useful introduction to alternative tunings, leading logically to an exploration of DADGAD, open D, D tuning (in which all strings are tuned 1 full note lower DGCFAD), drop D♭ (in which only the 6th string is tuned 3 frets lower D♭ADGBe) and drop D drop G (in which both the 5th and 6th strings are dropped a tone DGDGBe) tunings.

The tuning allows for chords with a root or bass note of D to be played with a D an octave lower than with standard tuning. It also allows the playing of open D chords that include the fifth and sixth strings, letting the full sonority of the guitar be heard. This can be especially useful for songs in the keys of D major or minor and is particularly effective on acoustic guitar. Drop D also allows fingerpickers to play chord shapes higher up the neck while maintaining an alternating bass. The bottom three strings, if left open, will vibrate sympathetically and, using chord shapes limited to the top three strings, a drone effect can easily be achieved.

The trade-off is the loss of the open bass E note in chords or fingerings, which the player can adjust to include fretting the sixth string at the second fret (now E).

== In rock and metal ==
Although the drop D tuning was introduced and developed by classical guitarists and lutists – such as English renaissance composer John Dowland – drop D tuning is mostly known from its usage in contemporary heavy metal and hard rock bands. One of the earliest uses of drop D tuning was by English composer John Dowland during the renaissance. Early hard rock songs tuned in drop D include The Beatles' "I Want You (She's So Heavy)" and Led Zeppelin's "Moby Dick", both first released in 1969. Tuning the lowest string one tone down, from E at D, allowed these musicians to acquire a heavier and darker sound than in standard tuning. Without needing to tune all strings (standard D tuning), they could tune just one, in order to lower the whole key. Drop D is also a convenient tuning, because it extends the scale of an instrument by two more semitones: D and D^{♯}.

In the 1980s and 1990s, alternative rock bands like King's X, Soundgarden, and Melvins, influenced by Led Zeppelin and Black Sabbath, made extensive use of drop D tuning. While playing power chords (a chord that includes the prime, fifth, and octave) in standard tuning requires a player to use two or three fingers, drop D tuning needs just one, similar in technique to playing barre chords. It allowed them to use different methods of articulating power chords (legato for example) and more importantly, it allowed guitarists to change chords faster. This new technique of playing power chords introduced by these early grunge bands was a great influence on many artists, such as Rage Against the Machine and Tool. The same drop D tuning then became common practice among alternative metal acts such as the band Helmet, who used the tuning a great deal throughout their career and would later influence many alternative metal and nu metal bands.

Nu metal bands including Deftones and Slipknot went one step further and decided to tune "drop" tuning even lower. By lowering the 6th string one whole step in lowered tunings they created a heavier and grittier sound. Lower tunings such as drop D^{♭}, used prior by groups such as Nirvana and Alice in Chains, drop C, drop B, drop B^{♭}, and drop A were used. These tunings are very popular among alternative metal, metalcore, and deathcore acts like Trivium, Emmure, Breaking Benjamin, August Burns Red, and Suicide Silence, where fast chord changes were an essential part of the sound. Progressive metal acts such as Pain of Salvation, Opeth, Fates Warning, and Dream Theater used these tunings in some of their E-tuned songs.

== Chords in drop D tuning ==
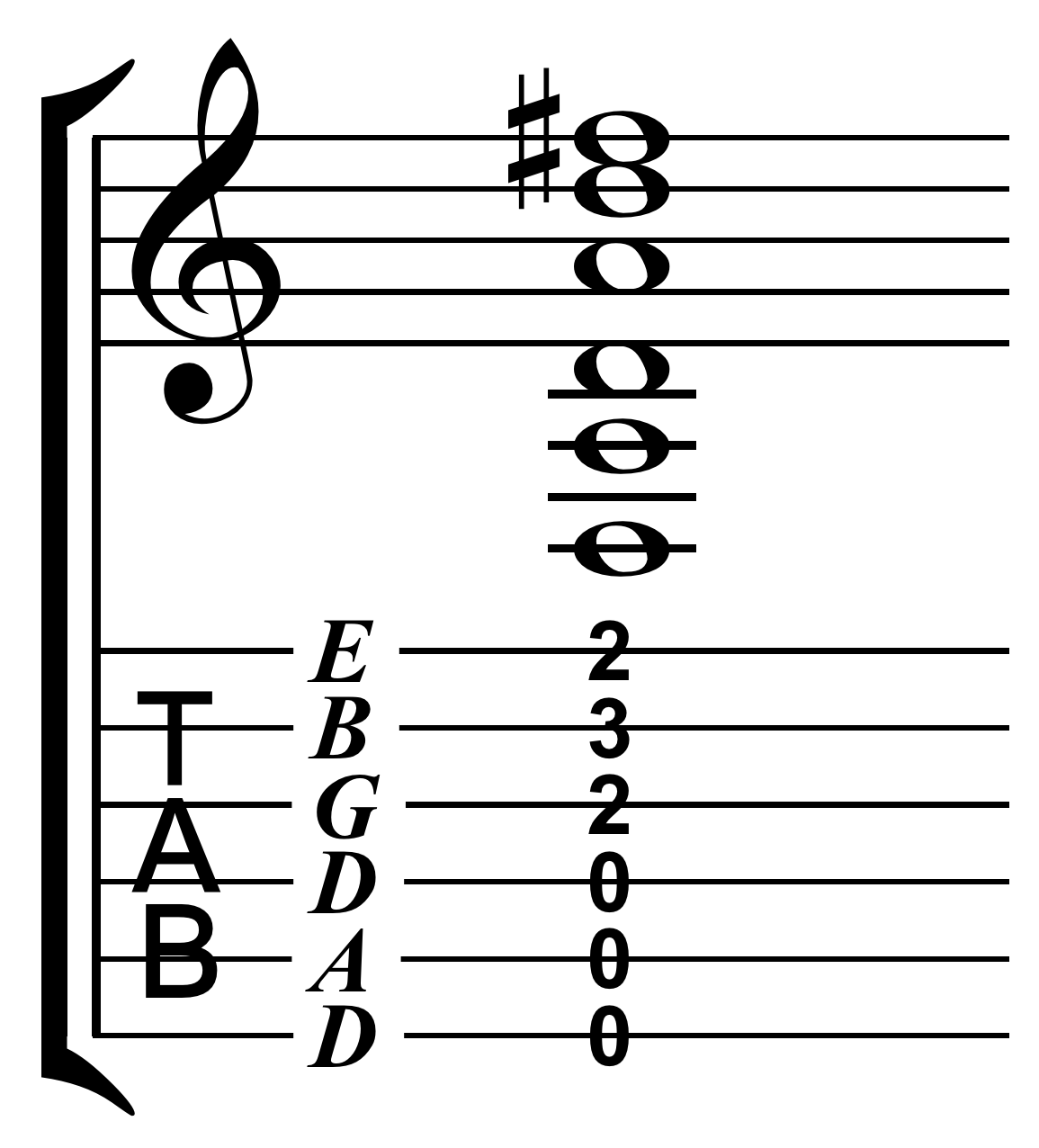
D chord in drop D tuning.

Chords in drop D tuning are formed as they are in standard tuning, with the exception of the sixth string, which is either omitted or fretted one whole step higher:

Chord	Tab
A	x02220
Am	x02210
B	x24442
Bm	x24432
C	x32010
D	000232
Dm	000231
E	222100
Em	222000
F	333211
F♯	444322
F♯m	444222
G	520033

Note that these chords are not the power chords commonly played in drop D tuning. Power chords generally mute the higher notes rather than the lower notes.

For purposes of making the table easier to read, spaces are provided between each number when the fret number becomes a double digit. Additionally, the highest note in any 5th chord is an octave from the root note so it is not necessary to play it to achieve a 5th chord.

Chord	Tabs	
A5	777xxx	x022xx
B♭5	888xxx	x133xx
B5	999xxx	x244xx
C5	10 10 10xxx	x355xx
C♯5	11 11 11xxx	x466xx
D5	000xxx	x577xx
E♭5	111xxx	x688xx
E5	222xxx	x799xx
F5	333xxx	x8 10 10xx
F♯5	444xxx	x9 11 11xx
G5	555xxx	x10 12 12xx
G♯5	666xxx	x11 13 13xx

== Relation to other tunings ==
Drop D tuning is the most basic type of "drop 1" tuning, where the 6th string is tuned down a whole step (a tone). A large number of other "drop 1" tunings can be obtained simply by tuning a guitar to drop D tuning and then tuning all strings down some fixed amount. Examples are Drop D♭, Drop C, Drop B, Drop B♭, and Drop A tunings. All of these use the same fingerings as for drop D tuning.
