= Scars on Broadway (album) =

Studio album by Scars on Broadway
- Released: July 29, 2008
- Recorded: 2007–2008
- Studio: Sunset Sound Studios (Los Angeles); Steakhouse Studio (North Hollywood, California)
- Genre: Alternative metal; experimental rock
- Length: 45:04
- Label: Interscope
- Producer: Daron Malakian

Scars on Broadway chronology
Scars on Broadway (2008)	Dictator (2018)

Singles from Scars on Broadway
- 1. "They Say" Released: March 28, 2008; 2. "World Long Gone" Released: September 8, 2008

Scars on Broadway is the debut studio album by Scars on Broadway, a band consisting of System of a Down members Daron Malakian and John Dolmayan. The album contains 15 tracks, all written by Malakian.

The album opened at No. 17 on the Billboard 200 with 24,000 copies. As of April 2010, the album has sold 83,000 copies in the US.

== Background ==
Following System of a Down's hiatus in May 2006, guitarist Daron Malakian announced his new project — Scars on Broadway — a band which would include System of a Down drummer John Dolmayan and himself. Malakian and Dolmayan experimented with different musicians, for a period of nine months in 2007 the band took form and forged its sound in intense rehearsals and recording sessions under Malakian's direction, at his home studio and Sunset Sound; with musicians Danny Shamoun on keyboards, Dominic Cifarelli on bass, and Franky Perez on guitar and backing vocals. The band begin recording their debut album in September 2007.

On what direction his album will take, Daron Malakian states:

"It will probably be something very heavy mixed in with traditional Armenian and thrash, death, doom, black and dark metal influences. When, or even if, the music comes out, it will still be structured, just like System of a Down's music is."

Malakian stated the sound will be influenced by classic rock such as David Bowie, Brian Eno, Yes, Neil Young, and Roxy Music, shifting his songwriting away from System of a Down's "frazzled metal" to more "song-based" work. "I don't feel we're the mosh-pit band," said Malakian. "That's just where I'm comfortable as a writer right now."

On May 2, 2008, the album was announced. A week later, the band was signed to Interscope Records.

The band released "They Say" as their first airplay single on March 28. The music video for the track was released on June 27. A second single, "World Long Gone", was released on September 8, featured a music video directed by filmmaker Joel Schumacher.

== Reception ==
Professional ratings
Aggregate scores
Source	Rating
Metacritic	73/100
Review scores
Source	Rating
AllMusic	3.5/5 stars
The Aquarian Weekly	Negative
BBC	Negative
Consequence of Sound	D
Entertainment Weekly	B+
The Guardian	4/5 stars
MetalSucks	3/5 stars
Mojo	3/5 stars
Rolling Stone	3.5/5 stars

Reviews for the album were generally positive, with the album holding a score of 73/100 on Metacritic. However, several reviewers were critical of the lyrics. The BBC's Al Fox gave the album a negative review, stating "It's tough to write a review so overwhelmingly negative in response to somebody's heartfelt outpourings but this kind of old-school rock is tired, worn out, and has as little relevance to today's world as a classical string quartet playing the millionth version of a 300-year-old concerto." Similarly, Consequence of Sound gave the album a "D" rating, stating "Scars On Broadway is most definitely worth hearing – if you're a die-hard fan of Malakian's vocals. It's sadly an overall novelty work, with lyrics that unfortunately toe the line of absolute absurdity in some cases".

Rolling Stone, in a 3.5 out of 5 review, stating "as Scars on Broadway, Malakian shaves System's punk-dervish and metallic-vengeance extremes into straight-on rock glazed with New Wave keyboards and impish-angel harmonies. It is a cleverly barbed normality." AllMusic, also giving the album 3.5 out of 5 stars, praised the album's instrumentals but criticized the lyrics. Billboard.com's Gary Graff stated of the album

"Malakian and SOAD drummer John Dolmayan have indeed brought something new for their fans to love—and perhaps even for non-fans as well, given the more direct and accessible nature of Scars' music. The duo still delves into SOAD-style idiosyncracies [sic] via the sonic tumult and machine-gun dynamics of such tracks as 'Serious,' 'Exploding/ Reloading,' 'Chemicals' and 'World Gone Long,' but Scars is just as apt to delve into the poppier melodicism of 'Funny' and 'Insane,' the full-on funk of 'Enemy' or the metallic muscle of "Stoner Hate."

== Track listing ==
All tracks are written by Daron Malakian.

No.	Title	Length
1.	"Serious"	2:08
2.	"Funny"	2:55
3.	"Exploding/Reloading"	2:15
4.	"Stoner Hate"	2:00
5.	"Insane"	3:07
6.	"World Long Gone"	3:16
7.	"Kill Each Other/Live Forever"	3:05
8.	"Babylon"	3:56
9.	"Chemicals"	3:13
10.	"Enemy"	3:03
11.	"Universe"	4:15
12.	"3005"	2:54
13.	"Cute Machines"	3:03
14.	"Whoring Streets"	3:01
15.	"They Say"	2:48
Total length:		45:04

Japanese edition
No.	Title	Length
16.	"Hungry Ghost"	3:29
Total length:		48:44

iTunes edition
No.	Title	Length
16.	"Scars on Broadway" (Instrumental)	2:50
17.	"They Say" (Music Video / Pre-Order Only)	2:48
Total length:		50:42

Best Buy bonus DVD / UK enhanced edition
No.	Title	Length
1.	"The Making of "They Say" (video)	3:10
2.	"They Say" (music video)	2:54
Total length:		51:08

2018 digital download
No.	Title	Length
16.	"Scars on Broadway" (Instrumental)	2:50
17.	"Hungry Ghost"	3:38
Total length:		51:32

2024 Deluxe Edition
No.	Title	Length
16.	"Scars on Broadway" (Instrumental)	2:50
17.	"War for Religion"	5:08
18.	"Stranger"	6:03
19.	"Hungry Ghost"	2:48
20.	"Fucking" (7" Vinyl Single)	2:03
21.	"Shotgun" (7" Vinyl Single)	2:14
Total length:		66:10

== Personnel ==
Scars on Broadway

- Daron Malakian – vocals, guitars, bass guitar, keyboards, organ, mellotron, production
- John Dolmayan – drums
- Franky Perez – guitars, backing vocals
- Danny Shamoun – keyboards, piano, percussion

Production

- Dave Schiffman – engineering
- John Silas Cranfield – additional engineering, editing
- Ryan Williams – mixing
- Eddy Schreyer – mastering
- Vartan Malakian – artwork
- Sandra Cand – artwork
- Brandy Flower – package design

== Charts ==
Chart performance for Scars on Broadway
Chart (2008)	Peak position
Australian Albums (ARIA)	43
Austrian Albums (Ö3 Austria)	22
Canadian Albums (Billboard)	11
Finnish Albums (Suomen virallinen lista)	14
French Albums (SNEP)	88
Dutch Albums (Album Top 100)	83
German Albums (Offizielle Top 100)	23
Italian Albums (FIMI)	78
New Zealand Albums (RMNZ)	26
Scottish Albums (OCC)	52
Swedish Albums (Sverigetopplistan)	54
Swiss Albums (Schweizer Hitparade)	58
UK Albums (OCC)	41
US Billboard 200	17
US Top Alternative Albums (Billboard)	4
US Top Hard Rock Albums (Billboard)	2
US Top Rock Albums (Billboard)	5
US Indie Store Album Sales (Billboard)	4
