= Joel Schumacher =

American film director (1939–2020)

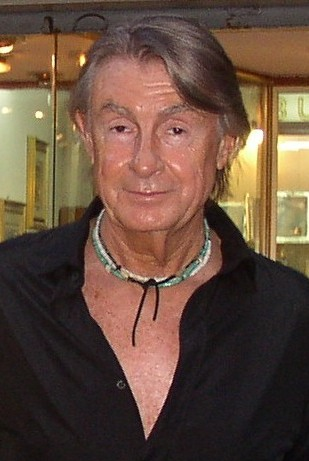
- Schumacher at the 2003 Taormina Film Fest in Italy
- Born: August 29, 1939; New York City, New York, U.S.
- Died: June 22, 2020 (aged 80); New York City, New York, U.S.
- Education: Fashion Institute of Technology; Parsons School of Design
- Occupations: Film director; producer; costume designer; production designer; screenwriter
- Years active: 1970–2015

Joel T. Schumacher (/ˈʃuːmɑːkər/; August 29, 1939 – June 22, 2020) was an American filmmaker. During a four-decade career, he directed more than 20 feature length films that spanned various genres. His films were commercially successful, grossing over a combined $1 billion.

Born in New York City, Schumacher worked as a fashion designer before entering filmmaking. After making his directorial debut in 1981 with the science fiction comedy The Incredible Shrinking Woman, he came to prominence with the 1985 coming-of-age drama St. Elmo's Fire and the 1987 comedy horror The Lost Boys. Schumacher directed several box office hits during the 1990s, including the science fiction horror Flatliners (1990), the romantic drama Dying Young (1991), the action drama Falling Down (1993), the crime thriller 8mm (1999), and the adaptations of the John Grisham novels The Client (1994) and A Time to Kill (1996).

In 1995, Schumacher took over the Batman film franchise with Batman Forever, which grossed more than $336 million. His 1997 follow-up Batman & Robin underperformed at the box office and became regarded as one of the worst films ever made. Schumacher was unable to maintain consistent commercial success afterwards, although the psychological thrillers Phone Booth (2002) and The Number 23 (2007) and his 2004 adaptation of the musical The Phantom of the Opera were financial hits. His final films received limited theatrical releases, including the 2011 crime thriller Trespass, his last feature length work.

== Early life and education ==
Joel T. Schumacher was born on August 29, 1939, in New York City. His parents were Francis Schumacher, a Baptist from Knoxville, Tennessee, who died from pneumonia when Joel was four, and Marian (Kantor), a Swedish Jew. He was raised by his widowed mother in Long Island City. During his youth, he used LSD and methamphetamine and started drinking alcohol by age nine. In 1965, he graduated from Parsons School of Design, after having studied at the Fashion Institute of Technology, and later became a designer for Revlon in 1966.

Schumacher said that at the time of his mother's death in 1965 his "life seemed like a joke" as he was $50,000 in debt, lost multiple teeth, and only weighed 130 pounds (59 kg). However, in 1970, he stopped using drugs and became employed at Henri Bendel. He later stated that "I got my self-respect back getting a good day's pay for a good day's work."

== Career ==
=== Production designer ===
In 1972, Schumacher served as a costume designer for Play It as It Lays and designed the wardrobes of Dyan Cannon, Joan Hackett, and Raquel Welch for the film The Last of Sheila. In 1973, he served as a costume designer for Woody Allen's Sleeper, and Paul Mazursky's Blume in Love. In 1974, he served as the production designer of Killer Bees. He later served as a costume designer for The Time of the Cuckoo, The Prisoner of Second Avenue and Interiors.

=== Early filmmaking ===
In 1974, Schumacher wrote a script for an eponymous biographic made-for-television movie based on the life of Virginia Hill. He was selected to serve as the movie's director and started filming on September 9.

In 1974, he and Howard Rosenman wrote the script for Sparkle which later went into production in 1975, and was released in 1976. His original plan for the film was for the film to be a "black Gone with the Wind", but had to be modest due to the limited budget given to the production by Warner Bros. According to Schumacher the film represented his "personal fascination" with Jesse Jackson, Angela Davis, Tammi Terrell, and Diana Ross. He was later selected to write the screenplays for Car Wash and The Wiz.

In 1978, Schumacher was selected to serve as the director of Amateur Night at the Dixie Bar and Grill which was later released in 1979. On January 31, 1980, he submitted a script for A Chorus Line, but the film underwent rewrites in development hell.

In 1979, he was selected to serve as the director of The Incredible Shrinking Woman, his first theatrically released film, to replace John Landis, who had left after Universal Pictures had reduced the film's budget. In 1981, the film was released to negative reviews, and was a box office bomb. The film was initially given a $30 million budget, but it was reduced to $11–13 million although it would later rise to over $20 million due to the cost of special effects.

In 1983, he directed D.C. Cab starring Mr. T, but later stated that he only worked on the film as he needed a job.

=== St. Elmo's Fire and The Lost Boys ===
In 1984, Schumacher was selected by Columbia Pictures to direct St. Elmo's Fire and was secretive during the production of the film. In 1987, he directed The Lost Boys. Both films were successful among young people and were his first major critical and commercial successes.

Following The Lost Boys, Schumacher directed Cousins (1989, a remake of the French film Cousin Cousine), Flatliners (1990), Dying Young (1991), and Falling Down (1993). He also directed two film adaptations of John Grisham best-sellers:The Client (1994) and A Time to Kill (1996).

=== Batman ===
Schumacher was selected by Warner Bros. in 1993 to replace Tim Burton as the director of the Batman franchise. He directed Batman Forever, which was a stylistic departure from Burton's Batman and Batman Returns. Batman Forever was released to mixed reviews, but was more financially successful than Batman Returns.

He later directed Batman & Robin, which was rushed into production following Batman Forever and was intentionally made toyetic and light-hearted to appeal to children and sell merchandise. The film was released to largely negative reviews and did not perform as well at the box-office as any of its predecessors, causing a planned sequel, Batman Unchained, to be cancelled. Schumacher later approached Warner Bros. to pitch concepts for a new Batman movie which were inspired by Frank Miller's graphic novels Batman: Year One and The Dark Knight Returns, but due to the box-office bomb of Batman & Robin, along with the negative impact that the film had on his reputation, Warner Bros. refused to let him develop another Batman film. In 2017, Schumacher apologized for the quality of Batman & Robin.

It was alleged that Schumacher, a gay man, had added homoerotic elements to the film with the most prominent being the rubber nipples, codpieces, and close-up camera shots of Batman and Robin's buttocks. Schumacher said the suit designs had been based on anatomically correct Greek statues and medical drawings. George Clooney, who played Batman in the film, said in 2005 that Schumacher told him that Batman was gay.

=== Later career ===
Following Batman & Robin, Schumacher directed 8mm (1999), Flawless (1999), Tigerland (2000), Bad Company (2002), Phone Booth (2002), Veronica Guerin (2003), The Phantom of the Opera (2004), The Number 23 (2007), Blood Creek (2009), Twelve (2010), and Trespass (2011).

In August 2008, Schumacher directed the music video for American rock band Scars on Broadway, for their single "World Long Gone".

In 2013, he directed two episodes of the television series House of Cards.

== Personal life ==
Schumacher was openly gay and described himself as "extremely promiscuous", saying in a 2019 interview that he became sexually active at age eleven, and estimating he had sex with between 10,000 and 20,000 men over the course of his life. He said the first person he knew who died from the AIDS epidemic, in 1983, "was not promiscuous", which led Schumacher to believe he would die soon after, recalling that he thought at the time, "If he has it, I must have it quadrupled [...] I was sure I had it, I was planning my death", though he never contracted the disease.

In 1984, Schumacher purchased the horse stables that had belonged to Rudolph Valentino from Doris Duke.

Schumacher donated to Democratic Party candidates, including multiple congressional campaigns as well as John Kerry's 2004 presidential campaign.

Schumacher died from cancer in New York on June 22, 2020, at the age of 80. Following his death, he was praised by Jim Carrey as well as Matthew McConaughey, who credited Schumacher with launching his career.

== Filmography ==
=== Film ===
==== Filmmaking credits ====
Title	Year	Director	Writer	Producer	Notes	Ref.
Sparkle	1976	No	Yes	No	Directed by Sam O'Steen	
Car Wash	1976	No	Yes	No	Directed by Michael Schultz	
The Wiz	1978	No	Yes	No	Directed by Sidney Lumet	
The Incredible Shrinking Woman	1981	Yes	No	No	Directorial debut	
D.C. Cab (a.k.a. Street Fleet)	1983	Yes	Yes	No		
St. Elmo's Fire	1985	Yes	Yes	No		
The Lost Boys	1987	Yes	No	No		
Cousins	1989	Yes	No	No		
Flatliners	1990	Yes	No	No		
Dying Young	1991	Yes	No	No		
Falling Down	1993	Yes	No	No		
The Client	1994	Yes	No	No		
Batman Forever	1995	Yes	No	No		
A Time to Kill	1996	Yes	No	No		
Batman & Robin	1997	Yes	No	No		
8mm	1999	Yes	No	Yes		
Flawless	1999	Yes	Yes	Yes		
Tigerland	2000	Yes	No	No		
Bad Company	2002	Yes	No	No		
Phone Booth	2002	Yes	No	No		
Veronica Guerin	2003	Yes	No	No		
The Phantom of the Opera	2004	Yes	Yes	No		
The Number 23	2007	Yes	No	No		
Blood Creek	2009	Yes	No	No		
Twelve	2010	Yes	No	No		
Trespass	2011	Yes	No	No		
Man in the Mirror	2011	Yes	No	No	Short film	
Sparkle	2012	No	Story	No	Directed by Salim Akil	

Executive producer

- The Babysitter (1995)
- Gossip (2000)

==== Other credits ====
Title	Year	Role	Director	Notes	Ref.
Play It as It Lays	1972	Costume designer	Frank Perry		
Blume in Love	1973	Costume designer	Paul Mazursky		
The Last of Sheila	1973	Costume designer	Herbert Ross		
Sleeper	1973	Costume designer	Woody Allen		
The Prisoner of Second Avenue	1975	Costume designer	Melvin Frank		
Interiors	1978	Costume designer	Woody Allen		
Welcome to Hollywood	1998	Cameo appearance	Adam Rifkin	Mockumentary film	
Halston	2019	Himself	Frédéric Tcheng		

=== Television ===
==== Filmmaking credits ====
Title	Year	Director	Executive producer	Writer	Notes	Ref.
Virginia Hill	1974	Yes	No	Yes	TV film	
Amateur Night at the Dixie Bar and Grill	1979	Yes	No	Yes	TV film	
Now We're Cookin	1983	No	Yes	Yes	Unsold pilot, directed by Noam Pitlik	
Code Name: Foxfire	1985	No	Yes	Creator & Story	Creator and producer (8 episodes) / Story (Episode: "Pilot")	
Slow Burn	1986	No	Yes	No	TV film, directed by Matthew Chapman	
2000 Malibu Road	1992	Yes	Yes	No	5 episodes	
Choose or Lose	2008	Yes	No	No	TV special	
House of Cards	2013	Yes	No	No	2 episodes	
Do Not Disturb: Hotel Horrors	2015	No	Yes	No	3 episodes	

==== Other credits ====
Title	Year	Role	Notes	Ref.
The Lie	1973	Wardrobe Designer, Costume designer	TV film, directed by Alex Segal	
Killer Bees	1974	Production designer	TV film, directed by Curtis Harrington	
Real Housewives of New York City	2012	Cameo appearance	S05E18: "All's Well That Doesn't End Well"	
Nightcap	2017	Cameo appearance	Episode: "Guest in a Snake"	

=== Music videos ===
==== Directing credits ====
Artist	Year	Title
INXS	1988	"Devil Inside"
Lenny Kravitz	1993	"Heaven Help" (European Version)
Seal	1995	"Kiss from a Rose" (Version 2)
The Smashing Pumpkins	1997	"The End Is the Beginning Is the End"
Bush	1999	"Letting the Cables Sleep"
Scars On Broadway	2008	"World Long Gone"
The Killing Floor	2012	"Star Baby"
