= Dictator (Daron Malakian and Scars on Broadway album) =

Studio album by Daron Malakian and Scars on Broadway
- Released: July 20, 2018
- Recorded: 2012
- Genres: Hard rock; punk metal
- Length: 44:05
- Label: Scarred for Life
- Producer: Daron Malakian

Daron Malakian and Scars on Broadway chronology
Scars on Broadway (2008)	Dictator (2018)	Addicted to the Violence (2025)

Singles from Dictator
- 1. "Lives" Released: April 23, 2018; 2. "Dictator" Released: June 1, 2018; 3. "Guns Are Loaded" Released: February 20, 2019

Dictator is the second studio album by American rock band Daron Malakian and Scars on Broadway, released via Scarred for Life on July 20, 2018.

== Background ==
Daron Malakian wrote, produced, and recorded the album over ten days in 2012. Dictator was officially announced on April 16, 2018. Regarding the delay of the album, Malakian stated "not knowing what's happening with System of a Down has kept me from putting my own stuff out. Too much time has passed, and I'm really excited to finally get some music out finally." Malakian stated that the new album could have been System of a Down music, however members of the band couldn't agree on musical direction.

When the album was announced, the band was rebranded as "Daron Malakian and Scars on Broadway" (previously only known as Scars on Broadway).

Malakian's father, Vartan, contributed the artwork for Dictator, as he did for the first Scars on Broadway album and System of a Down's Mezmerize and Hypnotize.

== Promotion ==
"Lives" was released as a single in April 2018. The title track was released as a single on June 1, 2018. The first week of sales of "Lives" on iTunes was donated to the Armenia Fund. The music video for "Guns Are Loaded" was released on February 20, 2019.

== Reception ==
Professional ratings
Aggregate scores
Source	Rating
Metacritic	64/100
Review scores
Source	Rating
The Arts Desk	4/5 stars
Exclaim!	3.5/5 stars
The Independent	4/5 stars
Metal Hammer	3.5/5 stars
Pure Grain Audio	4/5 stars
Rolling Stone	3.5/5 stars

The Independent gave the album 4 out of 5 stars, stating "With a dynamism and ferocity like few other releases so far this year, Dictator shines a light on Malakian's musical prowess: he performs all of the instruments on the record in addition to vocal duties, creating a shifting, immersive mood that delves into everything from straight-up thrash to early Eighties metal and signature, Middle Eastern-influenced guitar." The Arts Desk also gave the album 4 out of 5, stating "All in all, though, Dictator is an immediate and accessible affair, with irresistible hooks, singalong choruses and a pleasing amount of crunchy heaviness."

Exclaim! gave the album 3.5 out of 5 stars, stating "Dictator is a strong release that touches on a lot of the elements of System of a Down's final albums without too many of the quirky moments from those records. Still, it comes across as the comeback record that could have been huge but never happened."

Metal Hammer rated the album 3.5 out of 5 stars, stating "It's not hard to read Dictator as a sly 'fuck you' to his on-off bandmates, or at least the ones holding up a potential album. It's evident in their grand rebranding – they're no longer just Scars On Broadway, but now 'Daron Malakian And Scars On Broadway', a definite 'Who Needs You Guys Anyway?' statement. But it's also there in the fact that, yes, many of these songs could quite have easily parked their backsides on a SOAD record. On this evidence, that's System Of A Down's loss more than it is ours."

Rolling Stone placed the album fourth on its year-end list of the 20 best metal albums.

== Track listing ==
Track listing adapted from the iTunes Store.

No.	Title	Length
1.	"Lives"	4:04
2.	"Angry Guru"	3:36
3.	"Dictator"	3:00
4.	"Fuck and Kill"	3:35
5.	"Guns Are Loaded"	4:17
6.	"Never Forget"	3:19
7.	"Talkin Shit"	4:50
8.	"Till the End"	4:55
9.	"We Won't Obey"	3:39
10.	"Sickening Wars"	2:18
11.	"Gie Mou 'My Son'" (Instrumental, Stamatis Kokotas cover)	2:56
12.	"Assimilate" (Skinny Puppy cover)	3:39
Total length:		44:05

== Personnel ==
- Daron Malakian – vocals, all instruments, production
- Ryan Williams (Pulse Studios) – mixing, engineering

== Charts ==
Chart (2018)	Peak position
Austrian Albums (Ö3 Austria)	48
Belgian Albums (Ultratop Wallonia)	103
Swiss Albums (Schweizer Hitparade)	54
