= Sugar (System of a Down song) =

- Standard retail artwork

Single by System of a Down

from the album System of a Down
- Released: May 24, 1998 (single): May 26, 1999 (EP)
- Recorded: November 1997 – March 1998, January 19, 1999 (live tracks)
- Studio: Sound City Studios, Van Nuys; Akademie Mathematique of Philosophical Sound Research Studios, Hollywood
- Venue: Irving Plaza, New York City, New York (live tracks)
- Genre: Nu metal; alternative metal
- Length: 2:34
- Label: American; Columbia; DDEVIL Music
- Composers: Shavo Odadjian; Daron Malakian
- Lyricist: Serj Tankian
- Producers: Rick Rubin; System of a Down

System of a Down singles chronology
"Sugar" (1998)	"Spiders" (1999)

Alternative cover
- Promotional single cover

Music video
- "Sugar" (clean version) on YouTube

"Sugar" is a song by American heavy metal band System of a Down. It was released as the band's first single on May 24, 1998, and as an EP on May 26, 1999. The song was taken from their debut studio album, System of a Down (1998).

The song propelled the band into the front of the then current metal scene, giving them the opportunity to open for Slayer and later Metallica on their Summer Sanitarium Tour, get second stage at Ozzfest, and getting them their first headlining tour. The video for the song was often played on MTV after release.

== Music and lyrics ==
"Sugar" has been described as "a spazzy, jazz-spattered noise rock freak-out". The song features rapped verses from lead singer Serj Tankian, along with death metal growls and shrieks, the latter two being signatures of the band's early sound. The verses of the song feature guitarist Daron Malakian on backing vocals. Later in the band's career, he would move on to be more of a co-lead vocalist (although he sang on demos of "Roulette" and "DAM"). The ending of the song features the band speeding up from the original tempo.

Lyrically, "Sugar" is about the world's overuse and reliance on drugs and other substances, as well as the predatory state of media and news.

== Music video ==
The music video for "Sugar" shows the band playing on a stage, with an American flag intercut with images of public violence, hangings from the Holocaust, armies, footage of the Upshot-Knothole Grable nuclear test and footage from the German film Metropolis. The video was directed by Nathan Cox.

The video, along with the band's next single "Spiders", would be MTV mainstays for a long time to come, much to the surprise of the band.

== Reception ==
The song was well received by critics and fans alike. It is regarded to be the best song from this album, and one of the band's best overall.

== Track listing ==
All lyrics are written by Serj Tankian.

CD single
No.	Title	Music	Length
1.	"Sugar"	Odadjian; Daron Malakian	2:34
2.	"War?" (live)	Malakian	2:49
3.	"Sugar" (live)	Odadjian; Malakian	2:23
4.	"Suite-Pee" (live)	Malakian	3:04

All lyrics are written by Serj Tankian.

7" single
No.	Title	Music	Length
1.	"Sugar"	Odadjian; Malakian	2:34
2.	"War?" (live)	Malakian	2:48

All lyrics are written by Serj Tankian.

Sugar E.P.
No.	Title	Music	Length
1.	"Sugar" (album version)	Odadjian; Malakian	2:34
2.	"Sugar" (clean version)	Odadjian; Malakian	2:34
3.	"Störagéd"	Malakian	1:19
4.	"Sugar" (live version)	Odadjian; Malakian	2:27
5.	"War?" (live version)	Malakian	2:48
6.	"Sugar" (clean live version)	Odadjian; Malakian	2:27
7.	"War?" (clean live version)	Malakian	2:48

== Personnel ==
System of a Down

- Serj Tankian – lead vocals
- Daron Malakian – guitars, background vocals
- Shavo Odadjian – bass
- John Dolmayan – drums

Production

- Produced by Rick Rubin with System of a Down
- Mixed by D. Sardy
- Engineered by Sylvia Massy
- Engineer/assistant engineer: Greg Fidelman
- Additional recording/finishing Touches: D. Sardy
- Assistant engineers: Sam Storey, Nick Raskulinecz
- Assistant mixdown engineers: James Saez, Greg Gordon, Andy Haller
- Second assistant mixdown engineer: Bryan Davis
- Recorded at Sound City, Van Nuys, California
- Vocals and additional recordings at Akademie Mathematique of Philosophical Sound Research, Hollywood, California
- Mixed at Record Plant Studios, Hollywood, California & Hollywood Sound, California
- Mastered by Vlado Meller at Sony Studios, New York City
- Live Tracks Produced by D. Sardy
- Live Tracks Mixed by D. Sardy
- Live Tracks Engineered by Doug Henderson
- Live Tracks Recorded at Irving Plaza, New York City, New York

== Charts ==
Chart (1998–99)	Peak position
UK Singles (OCC)	136
US Alternative Airplay (Billboard)	31
US Mainstream Rock (Billboard)	28

== Certifications ==
Certifications for "Sugar"
Region	Certification	Certified units/sales
New Zealand (RMNZ)	Gold	15,000^{‡}
United Kingdom (BPI)	Silver	200,000^{‡}
United States (RIAA)	Platinum	1,000,000^{‡}
^{‡} Sales+streaming figures based on certification alone.
