= Drop C tuning =

Guitar tuning

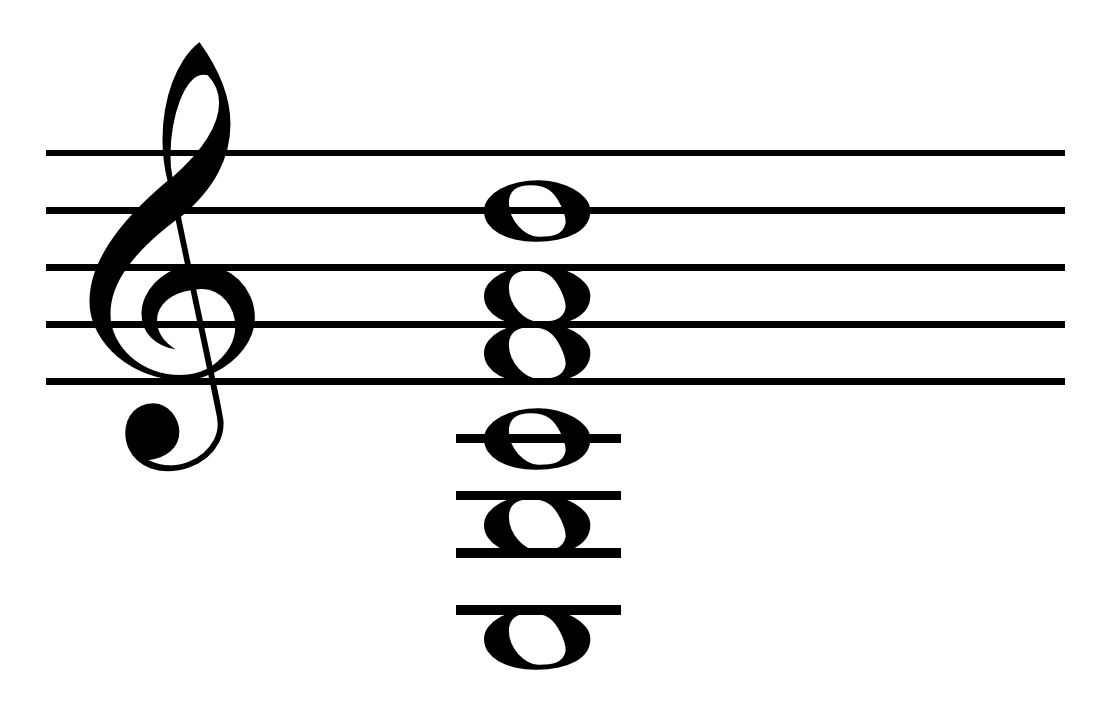
Drop C tuning (CGCFAD)

Drop C tuning (CGCFAD) (listen)

Drop C tuning is an alternative guitar tuning where at least one string has been lowered to a C, but most commonly refers to CGCFAD, which can be described as D tuning with a 6th string dropped to C, or drop D tuning transposed down a whole step. Because of its heavier tone, it is most commonly used in rock and heavy metal music.

== Examples ==
=== CGCFAD tuning ===
- Alter Bridge – on the song "Isolation"
- Arch/Matheos – on the song "Sympathetic Resonance"
- Chimaira – on most songs after their first album
- Metallica – on the majority of songs in the St. Anger album
- Nickelback – on most songs in their 2003 album The Long Road
- Skillet – on the song "Monster"
- System of a Down – on the song "Sugar"

=== CADGBE tuning ===
- Bob Dylan – predominantly in the period 1965–1966
- John Mayer – on the song "Neon"
- Muse – on the song "Map Of The Problematique"
- Brad Richter – on the piece "Flirtation"
- The Tallest Man on Earth – on the song "The Sparrow and the Medicine"

=== CGDGBE tuning ===
- Richard Thompson – on the song "Hope You Like The New Me"
- Soundgarden – on the song "Limo Wreck"
