= They Say (Scars on Broadway song) =

Scars on Broadway song

Single by Scars on Broadway

from the album Scars on Broadway
- Released: March 28, 2008
- Genre: Nu metal, alternative metal
- Length: 2:48
- Label: Interscope
- Songwriter(s): Daron Malakian
- Producer(s): Daron Malakian

Scars on Broadway singles chronology
"They Say" (2008)	"World Long Gone" (2008)

"They Say" is the first single by alternative rock band Scars on Broadway. The song was made available on both the band's official Myspace and their official site on March 28, 2008.

The song was made available for download on the video game Rock Band on July 29, 2008, the same day of the album’s release and is a playable track on the video game Guitar Hero 5. It is also in the racing game, Colin McRae: Dirt 2.

== Track listing ==
- All songs written by Malakian.

=== Digital Download ===
No.	Title	Length
1.	"They Say"	2:48

=== Vinyl ===
No.	Title	Length
1.	"They Say"	2:48
2.	"Hungry Ghost"	3:37

== Music video ==
On June 20, 2008, Scars on Broadway released a music video teaser for "They Say" on a MySpace bulletin and blog. In the teaser, the video is said to premiere soon. The official music video premiered on the Yahoo! Music page on June 27.

The video was directed by Paul Minor. It shows the band playing in a studio of some kind, and flashes clips of world event such as protests intermittently.

The video, that was on YouTube and had amassed over 6.2 million views, is now blocked in a lot of countries across the world. The reasons for this are currently unknown.

== Charts ==
Chart performance for "They Say"
Chart (2008)	Peak position
US Alternative Airplay (Billboard)	15
US Mainstream Rock (Billboard)	25
