= Daron Malakian =

Armenian-American musician (born 1975)

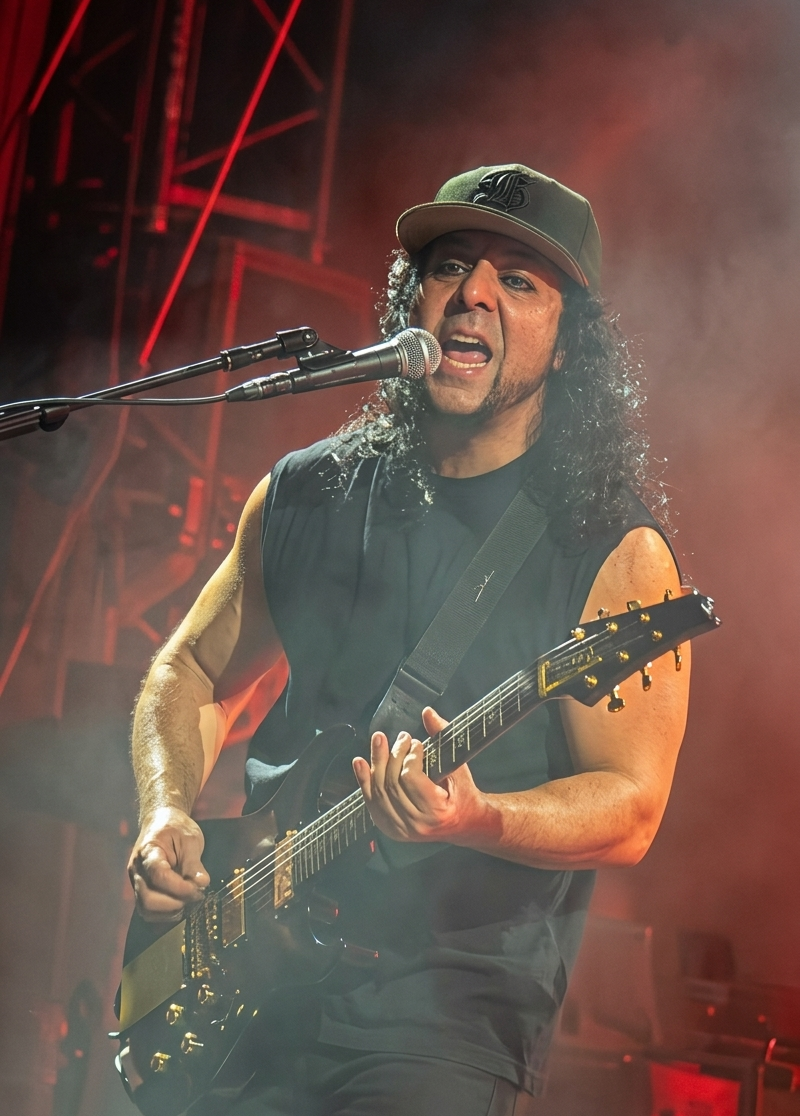
- Malakian performing with System of a Down in 2026

Background information
- Born: July 18, 1975 (age 51); Los Angeles, California, U.S.
- Genres: Alternative metal; alternative rock; nu metal
- Occupations: Musician; singer; songwriter; record producer
- Instruments: Guitar; vocals
- Years active: 1990–present
- Member of: System of a Down; Daron Malakian and Scars on Broadway

Daron Malakian (Armenian: Տարոն Մալաքյան; Western Armenian: Տարօն Մալաքեան; born July 18, 1975) is an Armenian-American musician. He is the guitarist, songwriter, and second vocalist of the metal band System of a Down, and the lead vocalist, lead guitarist, multi-instrumentalist, and songwriter of Scars on Broadway.

Malakian was ranked 47th in Loudwire's list of "Top 50 Hard Rock + Metal Guitarists of All Time" and number 11 in MusicRadar's poll "The 20 Greatest Metal Guitarists Ever". He placed 30th in Guitar World's list of "The 100 Greatest Heavy Metal Guitarists of All Time".

== Biography ==
Daron Malakian was born on July 18, 1975, in Hollywood, California, the only child to Armenian parents Vartan and Zepur Malakian (née Markarian). His father, Vartan, is a painter, dancer, and choreographer from Mosul, Iraq, and his mother is a sculptor who instructed college-level sculpting earlier in her career. At an early age, Malakian got into heavy metal music; his distant cousin played him a Kiss record when he was age 4. Malakian started listening to Van Halen, Aerosmith, Def Leppard, Black Sabbath, Iron Maiden, Judas Priest, Motörhead and Ozzy Osbourne. He always wanted to play the drums, but his parents got him a guitar instead because "You can't turn the drums off." Malakian first picked up a guitar at age 11, saying in an interview, "For the first year and a half, I learned how to play by ear, and did alright. After a few years I gained a reputation as a guitarist in high school. And by 16 or 17 I actually realized it was a good songwriting instrument, and, over anything, that's what I feel like. I don't pretend to be Mr. Guitar Virtuoso." During his teens Malakian listened to thrash metal bands such as Slayer, Venom, Metallica, and groove metal bands like Pantera and Sepultura. Malakian then began listening to the Beatles and cites John Lennon as one of his big influences as a songwriter. He also cites other British Invasion bands such as the Kinks and the Who as major influences as well as folk-rock such as trio Peter, Paul and Mary and punk pioneer Iggy Pop. Malakian went to Rose and Alex Pilibos Armenian School in the Los Feliz side of Hollywood, which his future bandmates Shavo Odadjian and Ontronik "Andy" Khachaturian (System of a Down's original drummer) also attended. System of a Down vocalist Serj Tankian attended the school as well, but he was years older than Malakian and the others. Malakian attended Glendale High School as a teenager.

=== System of a Down ===
Malakian met Serj Tankian in 1993, while they both shared the same rehearsal studio in different bands. Tankian was playing the keyboard for a band, and Malakian was playing guitar and singing for another band. They formed a jam band called Soil with bassist Dave Hakopyan and drummer Domingo Laraino. Shavo Odadjian then became their manager, and then rhythm guitarist. Soil broke up and Malakian, Tankian, and Odadjian (who switched to bass) formed a new band using the name "Victims of a Down", based on a poem that Malakian had written. The word "victims" was changed to "system" because Odadjian believed that it would appeal to a much wider audience and also because the group wanted their records to be alphabetically shelved closer to their musical heroes, Slayer. They recruited drummer Andy Khachaturian, who was then replaced by John Dolmayan in 1997.

Malakian co-produced System of a Down's albums with Rick Rubin, as well as albums by the Ambulance and Bad Acid Trip (a band on fellow member Serj Tankian's Serjical Strike Records). In 2003, Malakian started his own label, EatUrMusic, on which Amen was the first signed band. The label is now inactive and its current status is unknown.

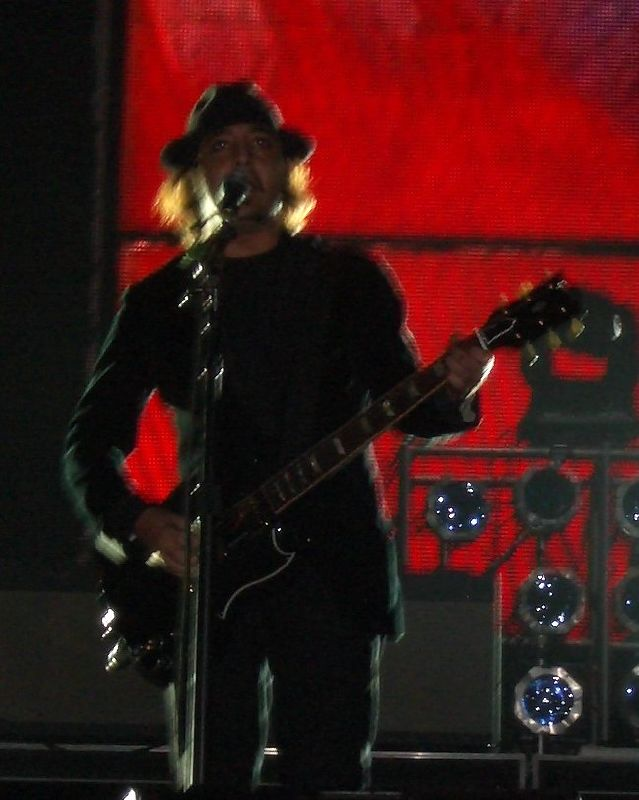
Malakian playing with System of a Down in 2006

=== Scars on Broadway ===
In 2003, Malakian (lead guitar and vocals), Greg Kelso (rhythm guitar), Casey Chaos (vocals), and Zach Hill (drums) recorded a demo tape entitled Ghetto Blaster Rehearsals, credited to the name Scars on Broadway. However, in 2007, an official letter appeared on the band's website that stated that these tracks are not in any way affiliated with Malakian's later project Scars on Broadway. Incidentally, these demo sessions produced "B.Y.O.B.", which would be a major hit for System of a Down in 2005.

Following System's hiatus, Malakian announced his latest project – Scars on Broadway – a band which would include System of a Down bassist, Shavo Odadjian, and himself. Ultimately, Odadjian was not involved with the band, and instead System of a Down drummer, John Dolmayan became a member. After Malakian and Dolmayan experimented with different musicians (for a period of nine months in 2007–2008) the band took form and forged its sound in intense rehearsals and recording sessions (under Malakian's direction at his home studio and Sunset Sound) with musicians Danny Shamoun on keyboards, Dominic Cifarelli on bass, and Franky Perez on guitar and backing vocals for live performances (in the studio Malakian played nearly all the instruments with the exception of drums which were played by Dolmayan and some overdubs provided by the other members). The group released an eponymous album in 2008, which featured the hit single "They Say" (written by Malakian). However, shortly before the tour supporting the album, Malakian canceled all scheduled concert and TV appearances, blaming a lack of enthusiasm and that his "heart wasn't into touring." This sudden cancellation prompted speculation and rumors that the band had broken up. It was the last that would be heard of Malakian for more than a year.

Malakian stayed out of the public eye following his cancellation of the tour in support of Scars on Broadway's debut album in October 2008. In 2009 Malakian made a surprise appearance (his first in a year) at Shavo Odadjian's Halloween Party and played "Suite-Pee", "They Say", and an unknown song with Odadjian, Dolmayan and Scars on Broadway's Franky Perez on guitar. It was the first time that the band members (minus Tankian, who was working on his second solo album) performed together in more than three years.

In August 2009, Scars on Broadway, minus Malakian, traveled to Iraq for a USO tour across the U.S. army bases. Their setlist consisted of covers as well as a few Scars songs. Guitarist/vocalist Franky Perez stated on his Twitter that "the Scars tunes sound amazing but they're not the same without D..." He also stated before they left that Malakian had given them his blessing. In 2009 Franky Perez mentioned on his Twitter that he and the D-Man (Malakian) were going into the studio to jam, this was the first news people have heard about Malakian's whereabouts for about a year.

On November 20, 2009, Malakian played at the Chi Cheng Benefit concert along with Deftones, and also performed with Odadjian and Dolmayan. Malakian, Odadjian, and Dolmayan played "Aerials" and "Toxicity". He appeared on Cypress Hill's 2010 album Rise Up, on one song, "Trouble Seeker", which he also produced.

On May 2, 2010, Malakian reunited with Scars on Broadway at the Troubadour in West Hollywood. It was the first time he had performed with the band since October 2008. The group played songs from their album as well as new songs. Odadjian performed with the band for two songs, playing guitar. On August 20, 2010, Malakian played in Hollywood with Scars on Broadway. On November 29, 2010, it was announced that System of a Down would reunite for a European tour to take place in June 2011. They played at the Download Festival on June 11, 2011. Despite playing a number of reunion shows, the band had no plans to record new material. In October 2011, John Dolmayan expressed his interest in writing new material but stated that band members were all busy with their other projects (such as Malakian's Scars on Broadway and Serj Tankian's solo efforts).

On July 29, 2010, Scars on Broadway released their first new studio recording in exactly two years, a Malakian-penned song called "Fucking". On February 24, 2012, System of a Down announced that the Scars on Broadway website was back online featuring a preview of a new song called "Guns Are Loaded".

In 2014, he appeared on Linkin Park's sixth studio album The Hunting Party, for which he provided additional guitars for the promotional single "Rebellion". The promotional single was self-produced by Mike Shinoda and Brad Delson. On August 18, 2016, Malakian performed with the Los Angeles–based alternative music project Millennials.

On October 28, 2017, Malakian performed with the members of Linkin Park which played a show at the Hollywood Bowl dedicated to the passing of their frontman Chester Bennington. He performed "Rebellion" alongside SOAD bassist Shavo Odadjian.

On April 23, 2018, Malakian released a song with Scars on Broadway called "Lives" about the history and culture of Armenia. On July 20, 2018, Malakian and Scars on Broadway released the album Dictator.

The third album Addicted to the Violence was announced on June 6, 2025, set to be released on July 18, 2025. The first single, "Killing Spree", was released on the day of the announcement.

== Personal life ==
Malakian is not married and has no children. In a 2019 Kerrang! interview, it was revealed that he is dating Gayané Khechoomian.

He is a sports enthusiast and a lifelong fan of the Washington Commanders, Edmonton Oilers and the Los Angeles Kings. He has a large collection of Oilers-related memorabilia and has held Kings season tickets since 1999. Malakian has been described as a fan of the Los Angeles Dodgers.

In a 2006 interview, Malakian said he has not consumed alcohol since he was 21 years old, but that he smokes "an insane amount of weed."

== Musical styles and influences ==
In addition to rock and heavy metal music, Malakian has been influenced by other musical genres. In 2018, he stated that he grew up listening to Armenian, Arabic, and Greek music. "I grew up with Armenian, Middle Eastern and Greek music — going to Armenian weddings, going to Armenian events. My family listened to an Egyptian singer named Umm Kulthum. She's the diva of Middle Eastern music. In the Arabic world, she is the goddess of Arabic singing. Umm Kulthum is like the Aretha Franklin. She's very important to me and my style. Music became my art form because of Umm Kulthum — that's because when my mom was pregnant with me, she would sing a lot of Umm Kulthum songs. I can't explain how I got into music. Music found me. I was in love with music ever since I was born. Umm Kulthum and Abdel Halim Hafez are two Arabic singers that are very respected in that community of music that are huge influences on my life. As a guitar player, I play Arabic scales. It comes more natural to me. Traditionally, American guitar players play more blues scales, and rock & roll comes from 12-bar blues. For me, Arabic music scales leak out of me effortlessly".

== Discography ==
=== Features ===
Year	Featured in single	Peak positions	Album
Year	Featured in single	FR	Album
2010	"Trouble Seeker" (Cypress Hill featuring Daron Malakian)	–	Rise Up
2014	"Rebellion" (Linkin Park featuring Daron Malakian)	83	The Hunting Party

=== System of a Down ===
- System of a Down (1998)
- Toxicity (2001)
- Steal This Album! (2002)
- Mezmerize (2005)
- Hypnotize (2005)
- Protect The Land (2020)

=== Scars on Broadway ===
- Scars on Broadway (2008)
- Dictator (2018)
- Addicted to the Violence (2025)

=== Other appearances ===
Year	Artist	Song	Release and/or explanation
Live performances
2000	Metallica (featuring Jonathan Davis and Daron Malakian)	"One"	
2000	Metallica (featuring Serj Tankian and Daron Malakian)	"Mastertarium"	
2003	Metallica (featuring Shavo Odadjian and Daron Malakian)	"Creeping Death"	Reading Festival 2003
2003	The Ambulance (featuring Daron Malakian)	"Stop"	
2010	Cypress Hill	"Trouble Seeker"	Rise Up
2014	Linkin Park	"Rebellion"	The Hunting Party
2017	Linkin Park (featuring Daron Malakian, Shavo Odadjian and Frank Zummo)	"Rebellion"	Linkin Park and Friends: Celebrate Life in Honor of Chester Bennington

== Production credits ==
Year	Album	Artist	Credit(s)
1998	System of a Down	System of a Down	Producer (credited as System of a Down)
2001	Toxicity	System of a Down	Producer
2002	Steal This Album!	System of a Down	Producer
2004	Death Before Musick	Amen	Executive producer
2004	Lynch the Weirdo	Bad Acid Trip	Producer
2005	Mezmerize	System of a Down	Producer
2005	Hypnotize	System of a Down	Producer
2008	Scars on Broadway	Scars on Broadway	Producer
2018	Dictator	Scars on Broadway	Producer
2025	Addicted to the Violence	Scars on Broadway	Producer

== See also ==
- History of the Armenian Americans in Los Angeles
