= Phantom Anthem =

Studio album by August Burns Red
- Released: October 6, 2017
- Genres: Metalcore, Christian metal
- Length: 53:41
- Label: Fearless
- Producers: Carson Slovak, Grant McFarland

August Burns Red chronology
Found in Far Away Places (2015)	Phantom Anthem (2017)	Guardians (2020)

Singles from Phanton Anthem
- 1. "Invisible Enemy" Released: July 26, 2017; 2. "The Frost" Released: September 14, 2017; 3. "Dangerous" Released: October 30, 2018

Phantom Anthem is the eighth studio album by American metalcore band August Burns Red. It was released on October 6, 2017 through Fearless Records and was produced by Carson Slovak and Grant McFarland. The album peaked at No. 19 on the Billboard 200, selling 19,000 equivalent album units (17,000 in traditional sales) in its first week.

== Recording ==
As with many of August Burns Red previous albums, guitarst JB Brubaker wrote and recorded all but two songs on Phantom Anthem; this included, rhythms, fills, leads and all. Brubaker began working on new material for the album in the winter of 2015, just six months after their previous album Found in Far Away Places was released. He completed all but one of his nine tracks before New Year’s 2016.

Instead of having drummer Matt Greiner record first like they had with all their previous albums, guitarist Brubaker and Davidson recorded all the main rhythm parts before Greiner had even entered the studio. This was due to Greiner not being able to make the first two weeks of the session due to food poisoning.

Lead singer Jake Luhrs stated that he studied a lot of pop artist in order to put his "vocals to good use" on the album. This was due to him wanting the vocals to be the backbone of the album instead of the drumming.

Commenting on the albums style Brubaker stated:

It’s heavier than the last couple. It took some of the heavier, more aggressive elements from some of our earlier records and fused it with some of the more melodic and technical aspects of what we’ve been doing more recently in the last couple of albums.

== Lyrical themes ==
Lead singer Jake Luhrs noted that with this album the band wanted to mature and take more chances when it came to lyrical themes. "I think for us, when we wrote this record, we just wanted to write something that felt like it was a mature step for August Burns Red, and something that was a little more darker and aggressive, kind of implementing our old roots." The album also features the song "Hero of the Half Truth," which serves as one of the bands first political themed songs criticizing the Trump administration.

Like many of the band’s previous albums all members of the band wrote lyrics with over 40 different lyrics being written for the album. The band then read over the lyrics together and decided which ones were the best fit for the album.

The albums title refers to people being something other than what they seem.

== Release and promotion ==
The albums first single "Invisible Enemy" was released on July 26, 2017, alongside an official music video which is a stop motion video featuring the band as miniature marionette puppets. This was followed by the second single "The Frost" which was released on September 15, 2017, and its music video was released two days later on September 17. A third music video for "King of Sorrow" was later released on May 8, 2018.

Phantom Anthem sold 19,000 units in its first week and debuted at number 19 on the Billboard 200. It also became the band 5th album to reach number one of the Top Christian Albums chart.

The initial "Phantom Anthem" tour took place in North America from January 5, 2018, to February 18. With Born of Osiris serving as support.

== Reception ==
=== Critical reception ===
Professional ratings
Aggregate scores
Source	Rating
Metacritic	82/100
Review scores
Source	Rating
AllMusic	4/5 stars
Alternative Press	4/5 stars
Jesus Freak Hideout	4/5 stars
Metal Hammer	3/5 stars
The Music	4.5/5 stars
Ultimate Guitar	8.7/10
Wall of Sound	Positive

Metacritic, with four ratings from selected critics, assigns a score of 82 out of 100, giving the album universal acclaim. James Christopher Monger, from AllMusic, gives the album 4/5 stars, and stated that Phantom Anthem delivers "a balanced, brutal, and almost relentlessly efficient 11-track set that deftly utilizes every inch of sonic space to its advantage". NewNoiseMagazine offers some additional positive feedback, praised the newest album, stating "It's true, classic metalcore, with sometimes lightning fast feeling guitar work underlying harsh vocals. There are not really any clean vocals on this release, but that's not a drawback...it doesn't push the genre – other bands can do that – instead, it just perfects it." Ultimate Guitar wrote "This isn't exactly a bare-bones, stripped down record by any stretch of the imagination, but it feels a bit more in line with the band's more respected peers that may be seen by some as "classics" in the genre, and has just enough of a progressive, melodic touch to it to keep the album interesting the whole way through."

Wall of Sound also praised the album stating "This album twists and turns, combining the heaviest metal with the tastiest jazz infused licks and almost orchestral arrangements. It’s an angry album for angry times, with strong and powerful messages without becoming preachy. If the boys deserved a Grammy nomination for 'Identity' they deserve a win for ‘Phantom Anthem’. The Music added "Here’s yet another fantastic August Burns Red album that will bring in newer, eager fans and will delight the older vanguard who have been around ever since 'Messengers."

=== Accolades ===
August Burns Red received a Grammy nomination for their song "Invisible Enemy" under the "Best Metal Performance" category.

== Track listing ==
No.	Title	Length
1.	"King of Sorrow"	4:05
2.	"Hero of the Half Truth"	5:03
3.	"The Frost"	4:46
4.	"Lifeline"	5:34
5.	"Invisible Enemy"	4:37
6.	"Quake"	4:08
7.	"Coordinates"	5:11
8.	"Generations"	6:00
9.	"Float"	4:15
10.	"Dangerous"	4:23
11.	"Carbon Copy"	5:39
Total length:		53:41

== Personnel ==
August Burns Red

- Jake Luhrs – lead vocals
- JB Brubaker – lead guitar
- Brent Rambler – rhythm guitar
- Dustin Davidson – bass, backing vocals
- Matt Greiner – drums, piano

Additional musicians

- Taylor Brandt – violin on "Float", "Generations", and "The Frost"
- Grant McFarland – production, engineering, mixing, cello on "Generations", "Coordinates", "Dangerous", "Float", "The Frost" and "King of Sorrow"

Additional personnel

- Carson Slovak – production, engineering, mixing
- Bob McCoy – assistant engineering
- Troy Glessner – mastering

== Charts ==
Chart (2017)	Peak position
Australian Albums (ARIA)	46
Austrian Albums (Ö3 Austria)	40
Canadian Albums (Billboard)	57
German Albums (Offizielle Top 100)	58
New Zealand Heatseeker Albums (RMNZ)	10
Swiss Albums (Schweizer Hitparade)	56
US Billboard 200	19
US Top Christian Albums (Billboard)	1
US Digital Albums (Billboard)	5
US Top Rock Albums (Billboard)	4
