= Lost Messengers: The Outtakes =

EP by August Burns Red
- Released: February 24, 2009
- Genre: Melodic metalcore
- Length: 21:20
- Label: Solid State
- Producer: Tue Madsen; Carson Slovak

August Burns Red chronology
Messengers (2007)	Lost Messengers: The Outtakes (2009)	Constellations (2009)

Lost Messengers: The Outtakes is the second EP by American metalcore band August Burns Red. It was released on February 24, 2009, through Solid State Records, featuring B-sides and demos from their previous album, Messengers.

Professional ratings
Review scores
Source	Rating
Christianity Today	4/5 stars
Indie Vision Music	Recommended

== Track listing ==
All tracks are written by August Burns Red, except where noted.

No.	Title	Writer(s)	Length
1.	"Chasing the Dragon"		4:21
2.	"Mosely"		3:51
3.	"Carol of the Bells"	Mykola Leontovych	2:44
4.	"To Those About to Rock"		0:59
5.	"Piano Man"		1:42
6.	"Truth of a Liar" (Demo)		4:09
7.	"Vital Signs" (Demo)		3:31
Total length:			21:20

Notes

- "Carol of the Bells" was originally recorded for the X Christmas compilation and was used in select movie trailers for The Spirit, which was released Christmas Day, 2008. It was also included in the 2010 Christmas special for American Dad!.
- "To Those About to Rock" is a parody of southern rock and southern metal music that was inspired by riffs played by the band for practice.
- "Mosely" was originally a bonus track from the vinyl edition of Messengers.

== Personnel ==
August Burns Red

- Jake Luhrs – lead vocals
- JB Brubaker – lead guitar
- Brent Rambler – rhythm guitar
- Dustin Davidson – bass, backing vocals
- Matt Greiner – drums, piano

Additional personnel

- Tue Madsen – production, mixing (tracks 1 to 5)
- Carson Slovak – production, mixing (tracks 6 and 7)
- Troy Glessner – mastering
- Invisible Creature – art direction
