= Guardians (August Burns Red album) =

Metalcore album

Studio album by August Burns Red
- Released: April 3, 2020
- Studios: Think Loud Studios, York, Pennsylvania; Seventh Wave Studio, Palmyra, Pennsylvania
- Genre: Metalcore
- Length: 49:27
- Label: Fearless
- Producers: Carson Slovak; Grant McFarland

August Burns Red chronology
Phantom Anthem (2017)	Guardians (2020)	Guardians Sessions (2021)

Singles from Guardians
- 1. "Defender" Released: February 6, 2020; 2. "Bones" Released: February 26, 2020; 3. "Paramount" Released: March 26, 2020

Guardians is the ninth studio album by American metalcore band August Burns Red. It was released on April 3, 2020, through Fearless Records. The album was produced by Carson Slovak and Grant McFarland. It is their last album to be released on this label before the band signed to SharpTone Records in 2022.

== Recording ==
While in the middle of recording the album, August Burns Red consciously took a break from recording. Meaning the album had two recording sessions, leaving a lot of time between the two sessions while the band went on tour for the 10 anniversary of their album Constellations. By April of 2019, the band already had eight songs written and finished, so they then recorded the guitar tracks to get a feel for how the album would be. Then following the tour they returned to the studio in August where they polished the original eight songs as they felt they weren’t heavy enough.

This album seen bass player Dustin Davidson write a lot more material than usual. This was due to guitarist JB Brubaker who usually writes a bulk of the band’s material having a child and not having as much time to do so. Davidson wrote six songs on the album, while Brubaker wrote the rest.

== Release and promotion ==
On February 6, 2020, August Burns Red released the first single, "Defender". At the same time, the band announced the album itself, the album cover, the track list, and release date. On February 26, the band released the second single of the album titled "Bones". On March 26, a week before the album release, the band released their third single "Paramount". A music video was made for "Defender" which features all the band members in a comic-book-style. An additional music video was made for "Bones" which guitarist Brent Rambler described as "the coolest music video we've ever done, It takes the song title quite literally, and creates an awesome and visually stunning video." A live performance video for "Paramount" was later released on December 2, 2021.

The album sold 12,000 copies in its first week, 10,500 of those being pure album sales. It debuted at number 53 on the Billboard 200, It became their sixth album to reach number 1 on the Top Christian albums chart, it also reached number 1 on the on the Hard Rock Albums chart, Independent Albums chart, and the Vinyl Albums chart.

After the release of the album on April 3, the band planned to embark on a full North American Tour in support of Killswitch Engage; however, the tour was delayed due to the COVID-19 pandemic.

== Critical reception ==
Professional ratings
Review scores
Source	Rating
AllMusic	3.5/5 stars
Dead Press!	7/10
Distorted Sound	7/10
Exclaim!	8/10
Kerrang!	4/5 stars
KillYourStereo	85/100
New Transcendence	8/10
Wall of Sound	8/10

The album received positive reviews from critics. AllMusic gave the album a positive review saying, "August Burns Red's particular brand of metalcore, one that favors melody and positivity over atonal angst, hasn't changed much over time -- the metalcore genre itself is as calculated as it is explosive -- but Guardians delivers 11 good-to-great reasons why that formula has worked for so long." Carlos Zelaya from Dead Press! rated the album positively calling it: "Guardians is all-in-all a solid album that will undoubtedly satisfy August Burns Red fans. It's hard to guess whether you'd get much out of it if you're not already sold by what they've delivered thus far in their career, or indeed of some of their contemporaries, but when it comes to this type of music, you could certainly do a lot worse." Distorted Sound scored the album 7 out of 10 and said: "There's little doubt that many jumping into Guardians won't be doing so in the hope that AUGUST BURNS RED are about to reinvent themselves. Nine records in, the Pennsylvanians blueprint is nigh-on set in stone by this point, and Guardians reinforces the idea that there's little wrong with this. Will AUGUST BURNS RED write a similar sounding record in two years time? Probably, but the band have done an excellent job at making that kind of statement a compliment rather than a criticism. Guardians is another notch on the belt of arguably one of modern metal's most consistent, reliable bands." Addison Herron-Wheeler of Exclaim! gave it 8 out of 10 and said: "While this record may not necessarily break new ground in the sense that it sounds like something we've never heard before, they definitely showed that they are still more than capable of making a solid record and keeping fans happy."

Kerrang! gave the album 4 out of 5 and stated: "Even with metalcore in its current era of hyper-innovative flux – every band and their dog experimenting with synths, samples and strange new sounds in a race to the genre's next evolutionary step – there's still something to be said for good old meat-and-potatoes melodic munch. 17 years in, Pennsylvania bruisers August Burns Red remain some of its highest-quality purveyors." Hunter Hewgley from KillYourStereo gave the album 85 out of 100 and said: "Guardians feels like an album that was written for any longtime lover of August Burns Red. There is truly something for everyone on their seventh record, pulling influences from every previous era of the metalcore band's history. In any other circumstance, I'd say that this was pandering and a cynical cash-grab, but no, it honestly feels as if August Burns Red is really enjoying writing music like this. You can hear the sheer passion and drive behind each song and every note played, and Jake Luhrs' energetic vocal delivery is the real icing on the cake. This is the album that many people, the band included, have been waiting on for years. As someone who had slightly fallen off of the August Burns Red bandwagon of late, I am over the moon to say that Guardians was a great reminder as to why this band is so wildly popular, and why I still love them as much as I do. I'm back on the wagon now!" New Transcendence praised the album saying, "Overall, Guardians is a righteous testament to diversity within metalcore. It boasts heaviness, catchiness, bounce, emotion, groove—you name it, it's there—but it simply lacks the staying power that made Phantom Anthem such an outstanding record. While August Burns Red's 2020 release isn't a whole step backwards, it fails to continue the incredible trajectory and, in many ways, halts the band's momentum, feeling like a record that—with just a little more refinement—could have been another star-studded entry in the band's ever-evolving discography." Wall of Sound scored the album 8/10 saying: "August Burns Red seem to deliver outstanding records, one after the other. If you're not yet a fan, it is never too late to experience what you have been missing out on and join the party."

== In popular culture ==
The song "Bones" was featured in American action crime drama NCIS: Los Angeles during episode 10 in season 12 as a punishment method towards prisoners.

== Track listing ==
All lyrics are written by Brent Rambler, except where noted.

Guardians track listing
No.	Title	Lyrics	Music	Length
1.	"The Narrative"		Dustin Davidson	4:09
2.	"Bones"		JB Brubaker	4:15
3.	"Paramount"	Matt Greiner	Brubaker	4:48
4.	"Defender"	Greiner	Brubaker	4:21
5.	"Lighthouse"	Greiner	Davidson	4:13
6.	"Dismembered Memory"		Davidson	4:09
7.	"Ties That Bind"		Davidson	4:18
8.	"Bloodletter"		Davidson, Brubaker	3:40
9.	"Extinct by Instinct"		Davidson	4:43
10.	"Empty Heaven"		Brubaker	4:25
11.	"Three Fountains"	Greiner	Brubaker	6:21
Total length:				49:27

== Personnel ==
August Burns Red

- Jake Luhrs – lead vocals
- JB Brubaker – lead guitar
- Brent Rambler – rhythm guitar
- Dustin Davidson – bass, backing vocals, additional guitar
- Matt Greiner – drums, piano

Additional personnel

- Carson Slovak – production
- Grant McFarland – production, cello on tracks 5, 9, 10, and 11
- Troy Glessner – mastering
- Florian Mihr – package design
- Ray Duker – photography
- Martin Wittfooth – illustration

== Charts ==
Chart performance for Guardians
Chart (2020)	Peak position
Australian Albums (ARIA)	54
Austrian Albums (Ö3 Austria)	41
German Albums (Offizielle Top 100)	24
Portuguese Albums (AFP)	39
Swiss Albums (Schweizer Hitparade)	22
US Billboard 200	53
US Top Christian Albums (Billboard)	1
US Top Hard Rock Albums (Billboard)	2
US Top Rock Albums (Billboard)	4
US Vinyl Albums (Billboard)	1

== See also ==
- List of 2020 albums
