= Death Below =

Studio album by August Burns Red
- Released: March 24, 2023
- Genre: Metalcore; progressive metal
- Length: 53:45
- Label: SharpTone
- Producer: Carson Slovak; Grant McFarland

August Burns Red chronology
Guardians Sessions (2021)	Death Below (2023)	Season of Surrender (2026)

Singles from Death Below
- 1. "Ancestry" Released: November 3, 2022; 2. "Backfire" Released: January 25, 2023; 3. "Reckoning" Released: February 22, 2023

Death Below is the tenth studio album by American metalcore band August Burns Red. It was released on March 24, 2023, through SharpTone Records. The album was produced by Carson Slovak and Grant McFarland. It is the band's first and only studio release with the label.

== Background and promotion ==
On November 3, the band released the first single "Ancestry" featuring Jesse Leach of Killswitch Engage and its corresponding music video. On January 25, 2023, the band unveiled the second single "Backfire" along with a music video. On February 22, one month before the album release, the band published the third single "Reckoning" featuring Spencer Chamberlain of Underoath along with an accompanying music video.

== Critical reception ==
Professional ratings
Review scores
Source	Rating
AllMusic	3.5/5 stars
Blabbermouth.net	9/10
Distorted Sound	9/10
Jesus Freak Hideout	4/5 stars
Kerrang!	3/5 stars
Metal Injection	8/10
New Noise	5/5 stars
Wall of Sound	8/10

The album received positive reviews from critics. AllMusic gave the album a positive review saying, "As per usual, the stalwart metalcore enthusiasts find the sweet spot between aggression and affirmation." Blabbermouth.net gave the album 9 out of 10 and said: "Offering both brawn and brains, August Burns Red maintain their status as metalcore behemoths on the uncompromising Death Below, one of the heaviest and most experimental sets of their careers." Daniel Fella of Distorted Sound scored the album 9 out of 10 and said: "[...] the most impressive part; ten albums in and we are still worshipping the ground that this band walks on. If that isn't a mark of success, then what is?" Jesus Freak Hideout rated the album 4 out of 5 and said: "Overall, Death Below shows ABR at their best and doing what makes them the metalcore giants they are as well. Outside of the few missteps where it could be argued that song placement and length should have been changed, this will probably go down as one of their best since Rescue & Restore. Hope and perseverance have always been a huge focus in ABR's music and it's a welcome thing to see that same focus and intentionality still present throughout the entirety of this entry and album cycle." Kerrang! gave the album 3 out of 5 and stated: "This may not be their greatest moment, but it certainly rewards those who take the time to sink into it, for this is superior metalcore played with heart and avoiding the cookie-cutter cliches of the genre. Death may be below, but for ABR, things continue to look up."

Metal Injection rated the album 8 out of 10 and stated, "Despite not taking many steps out of the band's own carefully crafted comfort zone, Death Below is a tree-trunk solid addition to the August Burns Red back catalog that is razor sharp even in its dabblings. While it pushes hard at a darker, more aggressive style of play on top of the usual playful and experimental sections, Death Below never loses the sense of passion that August Burns Red bring to the table that makes this more than just another metalcore day at the beach – and also more than just another August Burns Red album. Here's to another twenty years, on this evidence." New Noise gave the album 5 out of 5 and stated: "Overall, Death Below is a record of struggle, through and through, and although ABR tends to look on the bright side of even the darkest times, there is something so purely heavy and melancholy about their 9th outing. Bold, ambitious, and communal, this is ABR's best record to date." Wall of Sound gave the album a positive review saying: "After twenty years August Burns Red are very comfortable with who they are but unafraid to throw in some different spices to their metalcore dish. Death Below isn't the kind of commercial leap that might suddenly bring in new fans or see them rocket up festival bills but has some good hooks and some brilliant musicianship. They continue to be technically proficient, making Death Below a great album that rewards repeat listens."

== Track listing ==
All lyrics are written by August Burns Red.

Death Below track listing
No.	Title	Writer(s)	Length
1.	"Premonition"	John Brubaker; William Luhrs	1:53
2.	"The Cleansing"	Brubaker; Luhrs; Matthew Greiner	7:47
3.	"Ancestry" (featuring Jesse Leach)	Brubaker; Luhrs; Greiner; Brent Rambler	4:50
4.	"Tightrope" (featuring Jason Richardson)	Brubaker; Luhrs; Greiner; Rambler	4:13
5.	"Fool's Gold in the Bear Trap"	Brubaker; Luhrs; Greiner; Rambler	3:04
6.	"Backfire"	Brubaker; Luhrs; Greiner; Dustin Davidson	4:22
7.	"Revival"	Brubaker; Luhrs; Greiner; Rambler	4:29
8.	"Sevink"	Brubaker	1:23
9.	"Dark Divide"	Brubaker; Luhrs; Greiner; Rambler	4:58
10.	"Deadbolt"	Brubaker; Luhrs; Greiner; Davidson	4:20
11.	"The Abyss" (featuring J.T. Cavey)	Brubaker; Luhrs; Greiner; Davidson	4:34
12.	"Reckoning" (featuring Spencer Chamberlain)	Brubaker; Luhrs; Greiner; Rambler; Davidson; Spencer Chamberlain	7:52
Total length:			53:45

== Personnel ==
August Burns Red

- Jake Luhrs – lead vocals
- JB Brubaker – lead guitar
- Brent Rambler – rhythm guitar
- Dustin Davidson – bass, backing vocals
- Matt Greiner – drums, piano

Additional musicians

- Jesse Leach – guest vocals on track 3
- Jason Richardson – guest guitar solo on track 4
- J.T. Cavey – guest vocals on track 11
- Spencer Chamberlain – guest vocals on track 12

Additional personnel

- Carson Slovak – production
- Grant McFarland – production

== Charts ==
Chart performance for Death Below
Chart (2023)	Peak position
German Albums (Offizielle Top 100)	84
UK Album Downloads (OCC)	69
UK Independent Albums (OCC)	40
UK Rock & Metal Albums (OCC)	18
US Billboard 200	157
US Independent Albums (Billboard)	24
US Top Hard Rock Albums (Billboard)	8
