= Leveler (album) =

Studio album by August Burns Red
- Released: June 21, 2011
- Recorded: February 14 – March 16, 2011
- Genre: Melodic metalcore
- Length: 48:12
- Label: Solid State
- Producer: Jason Suecof

August Burns Red chronology
| Home (2010) | Leveler (2011) | Sleddin' Hill (2012) |

Deluxe CD cover
- August Burns Red Deluxe CD cover

Singles from Leveler
- 1. "Empire" Released: May 27, 2011

Singles from Leveler: 10th Anniversary Edition
- 1. "Poor Millionaire" Released: April 21, 2021; 2. "Pangaea" Released: May 6, 2021

Leveler is the fourth studio album by American metalcore band August Burns Red. It was released on June 21, 2011, through Solid State Records and was produced by Jason Suecof.

== Release and promotion ==
After spending nearly a year touring in support of Constellations, lead guitarist JB Brubaker announced on July 27, 2010 that the band would be taking a break from touring to begin work on a new album. The band announced that writing for their fourth album was completed on February 12, 2011 and planned to start production two days later. The album's name was revealed the following month.

They released the first song, "Empire", on May 16, 2011 on their Facebook page. It was announced on May 14, 2011 that they were shooting a video for "Internal Cannon". They released "Internal Cannon" on May 31, 2011 via Craveonline.com. The "Internal Cannon" video was filmed at an abandoned water pumping station in rural New Jersey that was located four stories underground. They released "Divisions", June 4, 2011 on YouTube and promoted it through their Facebook page. "Poor Millionaire", the ninth track from the album, was released June 14, 2011 on their official website.

== Commercial performance ==
Leveler sold around 29,000 copies in the United States in its first week of release to land at position No. 11 on The Billboard 200 chart.

As with their previous album, a special, Christmas seven-inch vinyl single will be released with the album through their old label, CI Records, and will be entitled "God Rest Ye Merry Gentlemen". The vinyl is limited to 1000 copies, 400 that are gold-colored, 400 that are white, and 200 that are mixed white-and-gold. The single was released on November 8, 2011.

Professional ratings
Aggregate scores
| Source | Rating |
|---|---|
| Metacritic | (78/100) |
Review scores
| Source | Rating |
| AbsolutePunk | 85% |
| Allmusic | 3.5/5 stars |
| Alternative Press | 4/5 stars |
| Blare Magazine | 4/5 stars |
| Christian Music Zine | 4/5 stars |
| Jesus Freak Hideout | 4.5/5 stars |
| Revolver | 4.5/5 stars |
| Sputnikmusic | 3/5 stars |

== 10th anniversary edition ==
For the album's 10th anniversary, the band re-recorded it with guest musicians, alternate tunings, and new guitar solos. The anniversary edition was released on May 21, 2021, through the band's own label, ABR Records. On April 21, the same day as the announcement of the 10th anniversary edition, the band released a new version of "Poor Millionaire" featuring guest vocals from Ryan Kirby of Fit for a King. On May 6, they released a new version of "Pangaea", that features a guest guitar solo from Misha Mansoor of Periphery, as the second single from the 10th anniversary edition.

== Track listing ==
All tracks are written by August Burns Red

| No. | Title | Length |
|---|---|---|
| 1. | "Empire" | 3:52 |
| 2. | "Internal Cannon" | 3:46 |
| 3. | "Divisions" | 3:20 |
| 4. | "Cutting the Ties" | 5:02 |
| 5. | "Pangaea" | 4:20 |
| 6. | "Carpe Diem" | 5:37 |
| 7. | "40 Nights" | 3:54 |
| 8. | "Salt & Light" | 3:40 |
| 9. | "Poor Millionaire" | 4:28 |
| 10. | "01/16/2011" (instrumental) | 0:52 |
| 11. | "Boys of Fall" | 4:28 |
| 12. | "Leveler" | 4:47 |
| Total length: | | 48:12 |

Deluxe Edition Bonus Tracks
| No. | Title | Length |
|---|---|---|
| 13. | "Internal Cannon" (acoustic) | 5:05 |
| 14. | "Pangaea" (performed by Bells) | 6:22 |
| 15. | "Boys of Fall" (performed by Zachery Veilleux) | 4:01 |
| 16. | "Empire" (MIDI) | 3:49 |

"God Rest Ye Merry Gentlemen" 7inch Vinyl
| No. | Title | Length |
|---|---|---|
| 1. | "God Rest Ye Merry Gentlemen" | 2:51 |
| 2. | "Little Drummer Boy" (instrumental) | 4:24 |

Leveler: 10th Anniversary Edition
| No. | Title | Length |
|---|---|---|
| 1. | "X" (instrumental) | 2:20 |
| 2. | "Empire" | 3:51 |
| 3. | "Internal Cannon" (featuring Matt Heafy) | 3:47 |
| 4. | "Divisions" | 3:23 |
| 5. | "Cutting the Ties" | 5:04 |
| 6. | "Pangaea" (featuring Misha Mansoor) | 4:30 |
| 7. | "Carpe Diem" | 5:42 |
| 8. | "40 Nights" | 3:56 |
| 9. | "Salt & Light" | 3:42 |
| 10. | "Poor Millionaire" (featuring Ryan Kirby of Fit for a King) | 4:50 |
| 11. | "1/16/2011" (instrumental) | 0:55 |
| 12. | "Boys of Fall" | 4:29 |
| 13. | "Leveler" | 4:46 |
| Total length: | | 51:15 |

== Personnel ==
August Burns Red

- Jake Luhrs – lead vocals
- JB Brubaker – lead guitar
- Brent Rambler – rhythm guitar
- Dustin Davidson – bass, backing vocals, additional guitar, pre-production
- Matt Greiner – drums, piano

Additional musicians

- Jason Suecof – percussion, additional guitar, production, mixing

Additional personnel

- Troy Glessner – mastering
- Eyal Levi – additional mixing
- Jonathan Dunn and Adam Skatula – A&R
- Jordan Crane – illustrations
- Invisible Creature – art direction
- Ryan Clark – design
- Cory Morton – band photography
