= August Burns Red =

American metalcore band

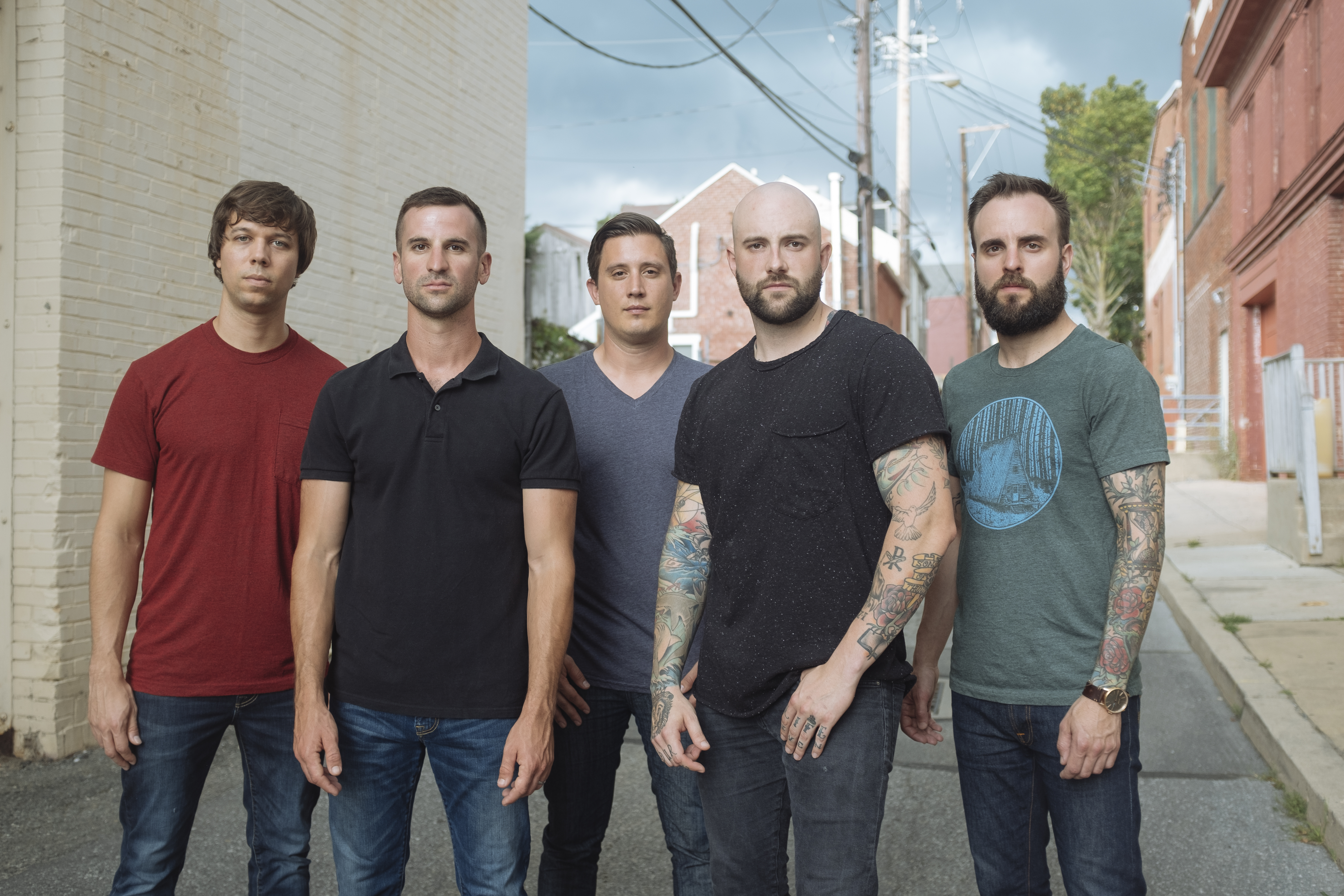
- August Burns Red in 2017

Background information
- Origin: Lancaster, Pennsylvania, U.S.
- Genres: Metalcore; Christian metal; progressive metal
- Years active: 2003–present
- Labels: CI; Solid State; Fearless; SharpTone
- Members: JB Brubaker; Brent Rambler; Matt Greiner; Jake Luhrs; Dustin Davidson
- Past members: Jon Hershey; Josh McManness; Jordan Tuscan
- Website: augustburnsred.com

August Burns Red is an American metalcore band from Lancaster, Pennsylvania, formed in 2003. The band's lineup of guitarists John Benjamin "JB" Brubaker and Brent Rambler, drummer Matt Greiner, lead vocalist Jake Luhrs and bassist Dustin Davidson has remained consistent since 2006.

Their debut album Thrill Seeker was released in 2005, and is the only album to feature vocalist Josh McManness. The group have released 11 full-length studio albums with the most recent Season of Surrender being released in 2026. Six of those albums reached number one on the Top Christian Albums chart. The band has also been nominated for a Grammy Award in 2016 for Best Metal Performance for the song "Identity" from its 2015 release Found in Far Away Places, and again in 2018 for "Invisible Enemy" from Phantom Anthem (2017).

August Burns Red regularly holds a Christmas music festival dubbed "Christmas Burns Red."

== History ==
=== Formation and Thrill Seeker (2003–2006) ===
August Burns Red was founded in March 2003 when all the members were attending high school. The original practice sessions of the band began in drummer, Matt Greiner's old egg house and basement on the Greiner family's farmland. After playing many local shows within Lancaster, they recorded their first EP, titled Looks Fragile After All with label CI Records in 2004.

Vocalist Jon Hershey eventually quit the band during the same year, due to being uncomfortable on tour, and wanting to pursue other endeavors. This led to Josh McManness taking on the position as lead singer. After several months of playing with McManness, August Burns Red signed to Solid State Records in 2005. Hershey would later go on to form post-rock band Bells. August Burns Red released Thrill Seeker, their first full-length album, on November 8, 2005.

=== Messengers (2006–2009) ===
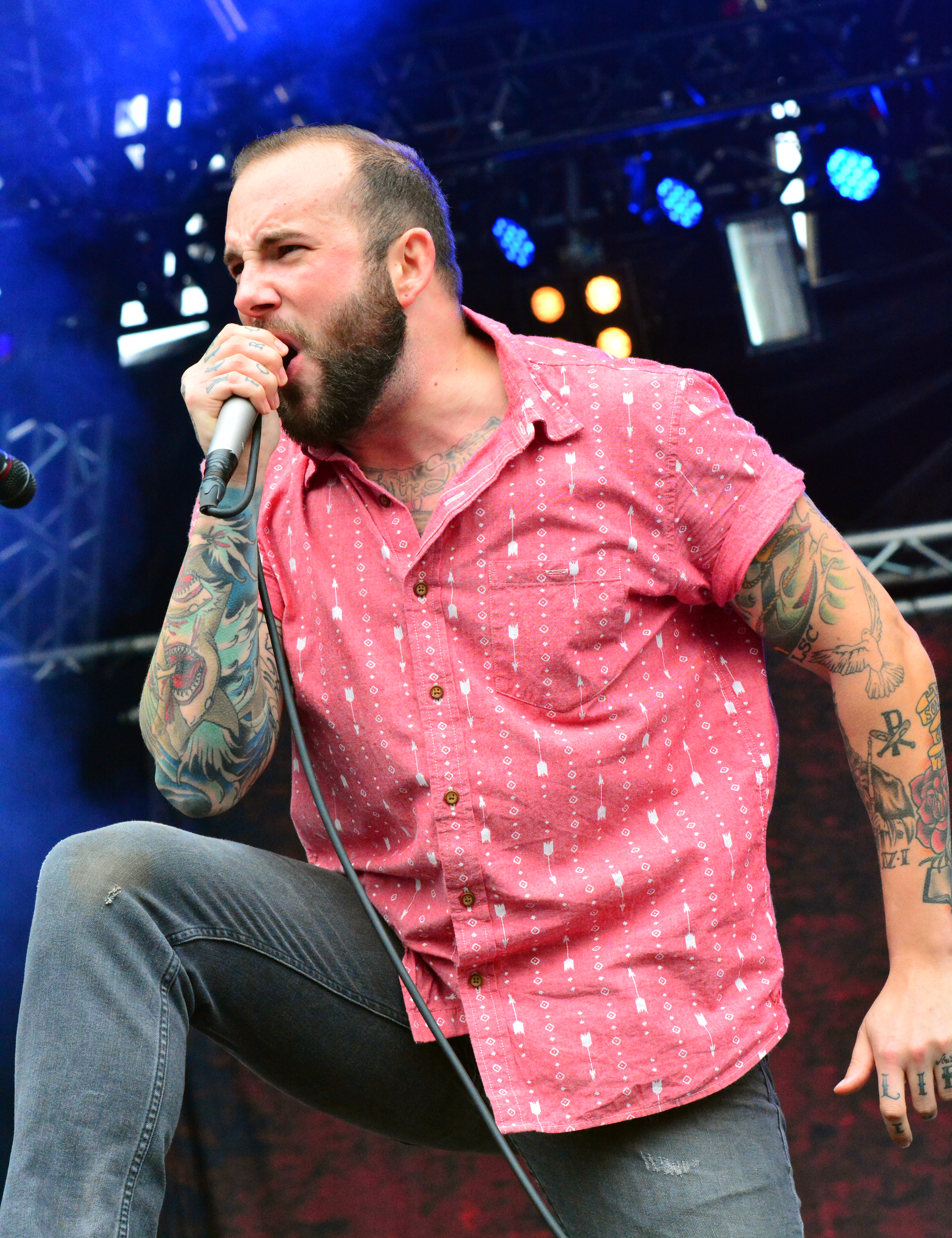
Vocalist Jake Luhrs joined the band in 2006 as the band's third and current lead vocalist

McManness departed from the band in 2006, after only one tour, this was due to him wanting to continue his education. He was replaced by Jake Luhrs, then a resident of Montclair, New Jersey. Bassist Jordan Tuscan also left the band in 2006 for similar reasons as McManness. He was replaced by bassist Dustin Davidson, a friend of the band. During the Spring of 2007, the band toured North America with From a Second Story Window and Chasing Victory. The band's second album, Messengers, was released on June 19, 2007. Marking the debut for Luhrs fronting the group, it became the band's breakthrough album, reaching number 81 on the Billboard 200, while also becoming their first to reach number 1 on the Top Christian albums chart. During the Fall they supported Unearth on a US tour alongside Darkest Hour.

Throughout 2008, August Burns Red toured with several acts across North America and Europe to promote Messengers. From April to May they toured with As I Lay Dying and Misery Signals across the United States and Canada. In September and October of that same year, they headlined a tour with A Skylit Drive, Sky Eats Airplane, Greeley Estates, and This or the Apocalypse in the United States. The band also visited Europe for a month-long headlining tour in November, playing in Germany, Finland, Norway, Sweden, the United Kingdom, Republic Of Ireland, Northern Ireland, Italy, Belgium, The Netherlands, Czech Republic, Slovakia, and France.

After this series of tours, the band recorded two covers of popular songs. They recorded an instrumental version of the classic song, "Carol of the Bells" for the X Christmas compilation album, which was featured in trailers for the film, The Spirit, released Christmas Day 2008. They also recorded a cover of "...Baby One More Time" by pop singer Britney Spears for the Punk Goes Pop 2 compilation album, released in March 2009.

On February 24, 2009, the band released an EP, entitled Lost Messengers: The Outtakes. It contains material that is related or was decided not to be included in the final, mastered version of Messengers. August Burns Reds' first trip to the Middle East took place on March 6, 2009, with the band playing at the Dubai Desert Rock Festival. The band's last tour before their next album release took place in the United States, where they toured with metalcore band All That Remains throughout April and May.

=== Constellations (2009–2011) ===
To promote their upcoming album, August Burns Red released several new tracks and a music video during June 2009. The tracks Thirty and Seven, Existence, and Ocean of Apathy were all released on the 15th, 21st, and 29th, respectively. A music video for the song Meddler was also released during this month. On July 7, a week before the album's release, August Burns Red began streaming the full album on their Myspace profile for a limited time. August Burns Red released their third full-length album, Constellations, on July 14, 2009. During the week of August 1, 2009, the album charted at spot 24 on the Billboard 200. Another United States tour was organized with August Burns Red headlining and support from Blessthefall, Enter Shikari, All Shall Perish, and Iwrestledabearonce. After this tour, the band joined a short tour in Australia with Architects in support of Australian band Parkway Drive. August Burns Red toured alongside Underoath and Emery in November and December 2009 as well.

The band released their first live CD/DVD, Home, on September 28, 2010. The group co-headlined an Alternative Press tour throughout November. On February 23, 2010, Constellations was nominated for the Dove Award for "Best Rock Album".

August Burns Red toured Australia and New Zealand in December 2010 on the No Sleep Til Festival. The band played alongside Parkway Drive, A Day to Remember, NOFX, Dropkick Murphys, Suicide Silence, Megadeth, Descendents, Gwar and many others.

=== Leveler and Sleddin' Hill (2011–2013) ===
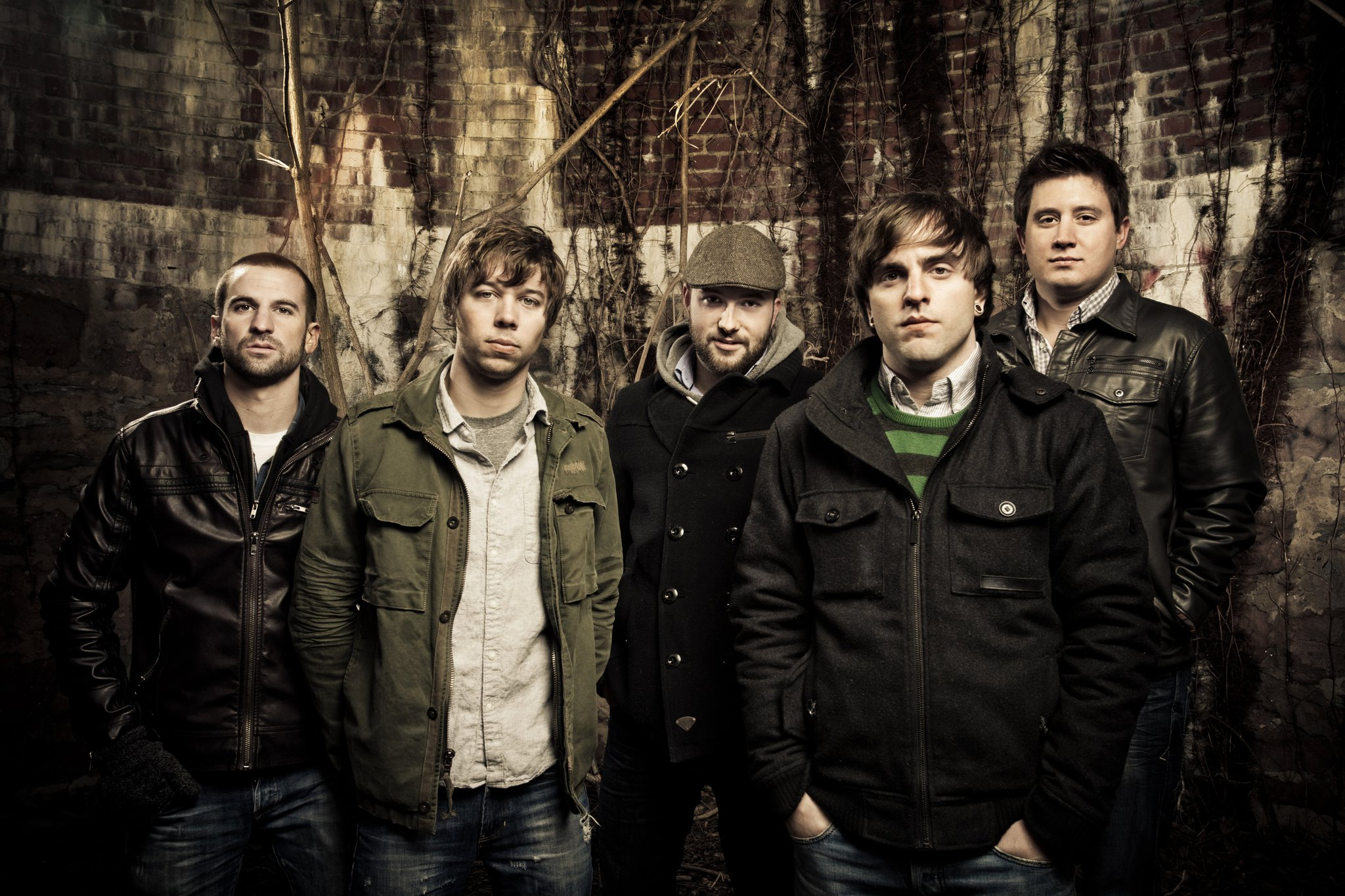
August Burns Red in April 2011

On July 27, 2010, Brubaker stated that the band would be taking time off tour to write their next record. On February 12, 2011, the band announced via their official Facebook page that they had completely finished writing their new record and that they would be entering the studio on Valentine's Day. In March 2011, the band announced that the record was finished, and that it was (at that point) time for mixing. On April 5, 2011, August Burns Red revealed the name of the record as Leveler.

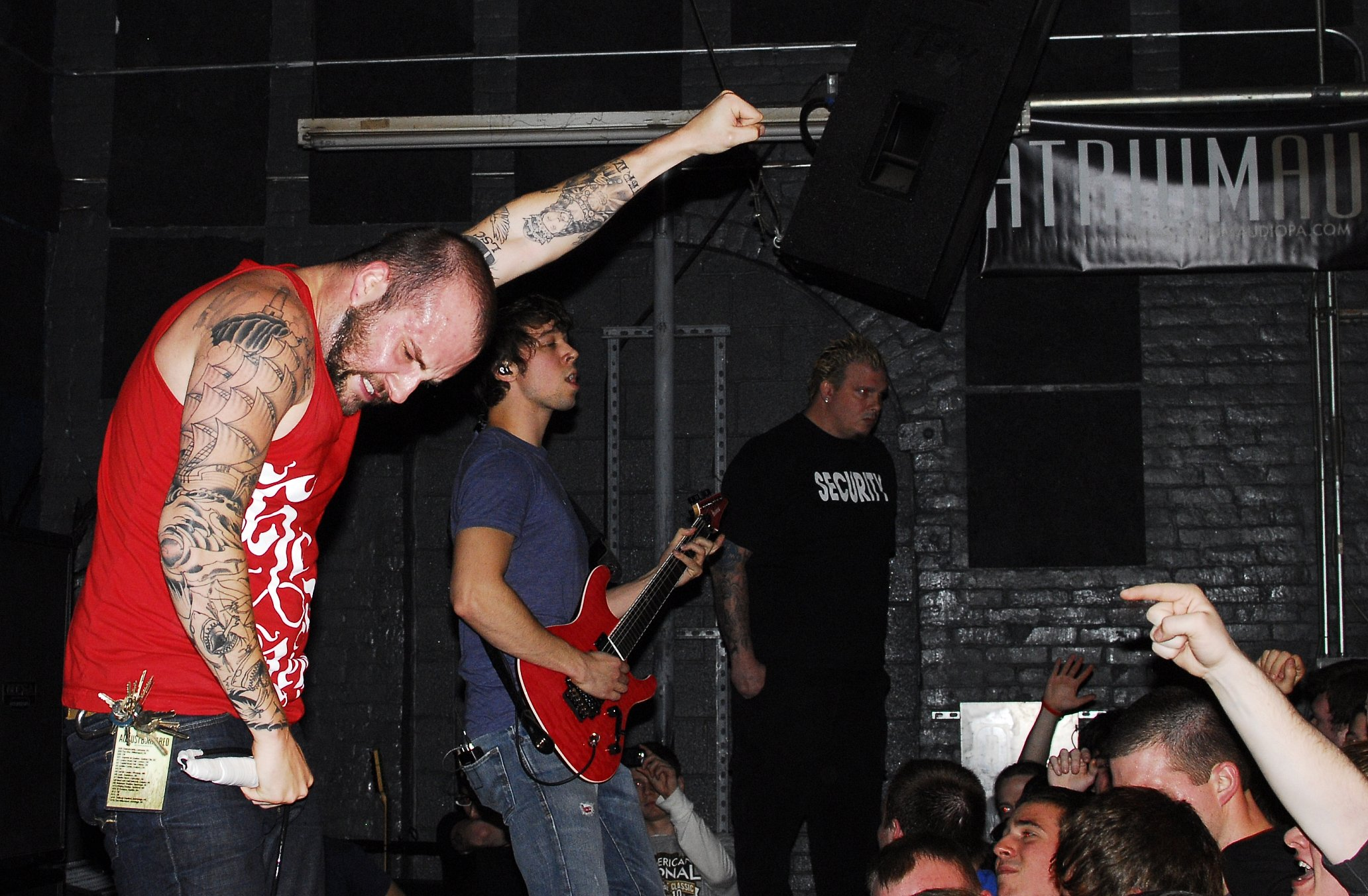
August Burns Red performing live in 2011

Leveler was released on June 21, 2011, in two forms; standard and deluxe. The deluxe version of Leveler contains four extra songs, including an acoustic version of the song "Internal Cannon". The album sold particularly well compared to their other releases, with 29,000 of its opening first week-copies being sold in the United States alone. These sales had the record land at position 11 on The Billboard 200 chart. After the release, August Burns Red took part on the main stage of the 2011 Vans Warped Tour. During October–November 2011 the band took part in the European Eastpak Antidote Tour A Day to Remember,The Ghost Inside and Living with Lions.

August Burns Red headlined their own Leveler tour on the first quarter of 2012 with Silverstein, Texas in July, I the Breather and Letlive as support acts. In 2012, August Burns Red embarked on a European tour with The Devil Wears Prada and Veil of Maya, and an American tour with Of Mice & Men and The Color Morale.

August Burns Red released their first Holiday album, entitled August Burns Red Presents: Sleddin' Hill on October 9, 2012.

On February 8, 2013, the band was officially announced as part of Warped Tour 2013 alongside Bring Me the Horizon, NeverShoutNever, Black Veil Brides, 3OH!3, Crizzly and Bowling for Soup.

=== Rescue & Restore (2013–2014) ===
On February 12, 2013, the band announced that they would be back in the studio the next week to commence recording on their new album. Carson Slovak (Century) and Grant McFarland (former This or the Apocalypse drummer) again oversaw the production of the album.

On May 5, they announced that the album, Rescue & Restore was set to release June 25, 2013. The album debuted at No. 9 on the Billboard 200. This is the highest that they have reached on the chart. On August 30, they announced that they would release a documentary DVD titled Foreign & Familiar before the end of the year. Lyrically, the release delved into topics such as depression, grief at the death of a loved one, and social tolerance. It also featured influences from progressive metal and thrash metal as well as more mellow, melodic rock music. Adam Gray of the band Texas in July appears as a guest musician. In November and December of 2013, August Burns Red embarked on a North American tour with Blessthefall, Defeater and Beartooth serving as support.

=== Found in Far Away Places (2014–2016) ===
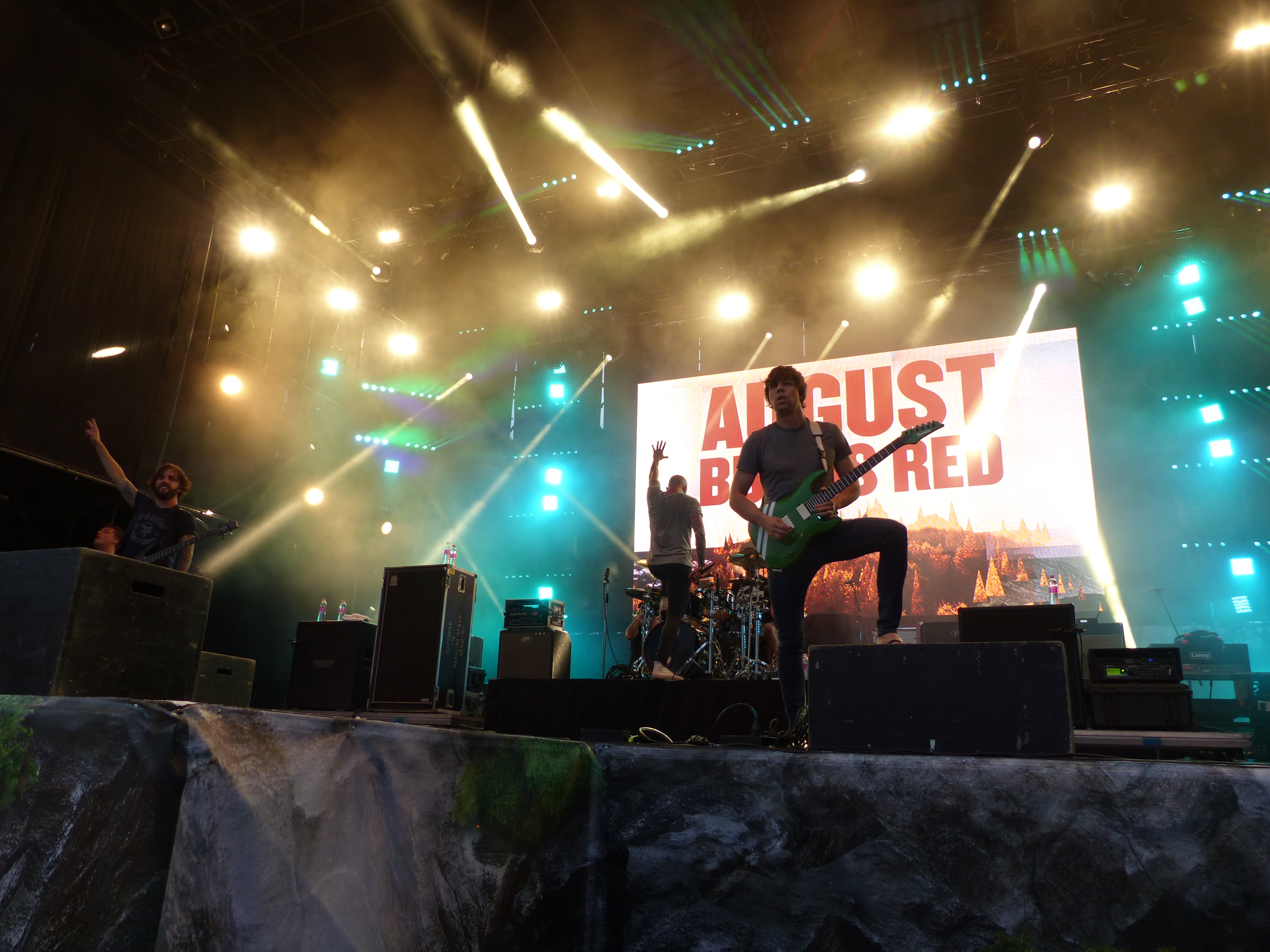
August Burns Red in Budapest on June 14, 2016

During the Summer of 2014, August Burns Red made multiple festival appearances. On August 5, 2014, it was announced the band had signed to Fearless Records and Found in Far Away Places would be available for pre-order on April 13, 2015, along with their new single "The Wake", with the album set to be released on June 29, 2015. The album would debut at No. 9 on the Billboard 200 chart. It also reached number one on the Top Christian albums chart, US Hard Rock, US Independent and became their first to reach number one on both the US Top Rock and US Top Rock & Alternative albums charts.

The band embarked on the Frozen Flame Tour from January 22 to March 8, 2015, along with Miss May I, Northlane, Fit for a King and Erra, for 39 shows in Canada and the United States, sponsored by Rockstar Energy. They then headlined a US tour during the Winter alongside Every Time I Die and Stick to Your Guns.

On December 7, 2015, August Burns Red was nominated for a Grammy Award in the Best Metal Performance Category for their song "Identity". In the Spring of 2016, August Burns Red held an extensive US tour with support from The Faceless and the Good Tiger. During the Fall they embarked on the "The Legends of the Fall" tour with Erra serving as support.

On July 1, 2016, just over a year after its release, the band released an instrumental edition of Found in Far Away Places.

=== Phantom Anthem (2016–2018) ===
On November 21, 2016, a teaser for the Messengers 10th Anniversary Tour in Europe and the United States was uploaded to the band's Facebook page. The tour started on the January 4, 2017 and went till February 17, with supporting artists, Protest the Hero, In Hearts Wake and '68. On July 26, 2017, August Burns Red announced their new album, Phantom Anthem, released on October 6, 2017. It debuted at No. 19 on the Billboard 200 chart.On November 28, 2017, it was further announced that band had been nominated for another Grammy Award in "Best Metal Performance" for "Invisible Enemy".

On January 26, 2018, the band released a remixed version of Messengers, for the album's 10th-year anniversary via Solid State Records. During the bands 15th anniversary show on April 14, at the Lancaster County Convention Center they reunited with former bassist Jordan Tuscan and vocalist Josh McManness, to play songs off their 2005 debut album Thrill Seeker.

=== Guardians and Leveler: 10th Anniversary Edition (2019–2021) ===
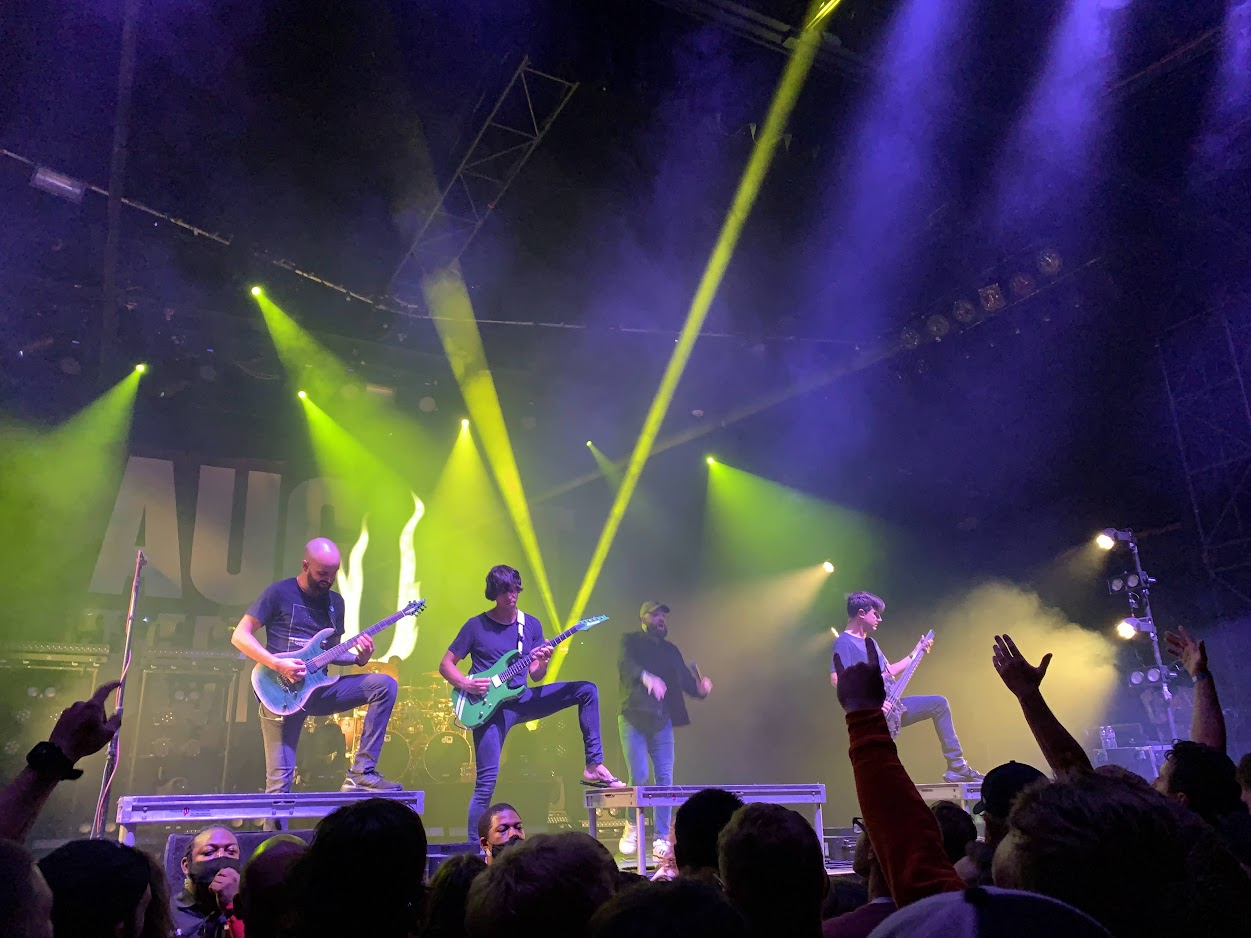
August Burns Red at Fillmore Auditorium in Denver in 2021

On June 14, 2019, the band released a remixed version of Constellations for the album's 10-year anniversary, once again via Solid State Records.

In 2019, the band embarked on the Constellations 10th Anniversary World Tour spanning from June 21 to December. The band will tour North America over the summer, go to Australia in October, and finish the tour in Europe in November and December.

On December 13, 2019, the band released an instrumental edition of Phantom Anthem.

On February 6, 2020, August Burns Red released their first single, "Defender", from their upcoming ninth studio album, Guardians, which was scheduled to be released on April 3, 2020, after which they were slated to embark on a full North American tour in support of Killswitch Engage. On February 26, the band released the second single of the album titled "Bones". On March 26, a week before the album release, the band released their third single "Paramount". The album debuted at No. 53 on the Billboard 200 chart. On December 15, the band released their cover of System of a Down's "Chop Suey!" on streaming music services.

For the 10th anniversary of the album Leveler, the band re-recorded it with guest musicians, alternate tunings, and new guitar solos. The anniversary edition was released on May 21, 2021, through the band's own label, ABR Records. On April 21, the same day as the announcement of the 10th anniversary edition, the band released a new version of "Poor Millionaire" featuring guest vocals from Ryan Kirby of Fit for a King. On May 6, they released a new version of "Pangaea", that features a guest guitar solo from Misha Mansoor of Periphery, as the second single from the 10th anniversary edition. On October 14, 2021, the band released a new song entitled "Vengeance".

=== Death Below and Thrill Seeker: 20th Anniversary Edition (2022–2025) ===
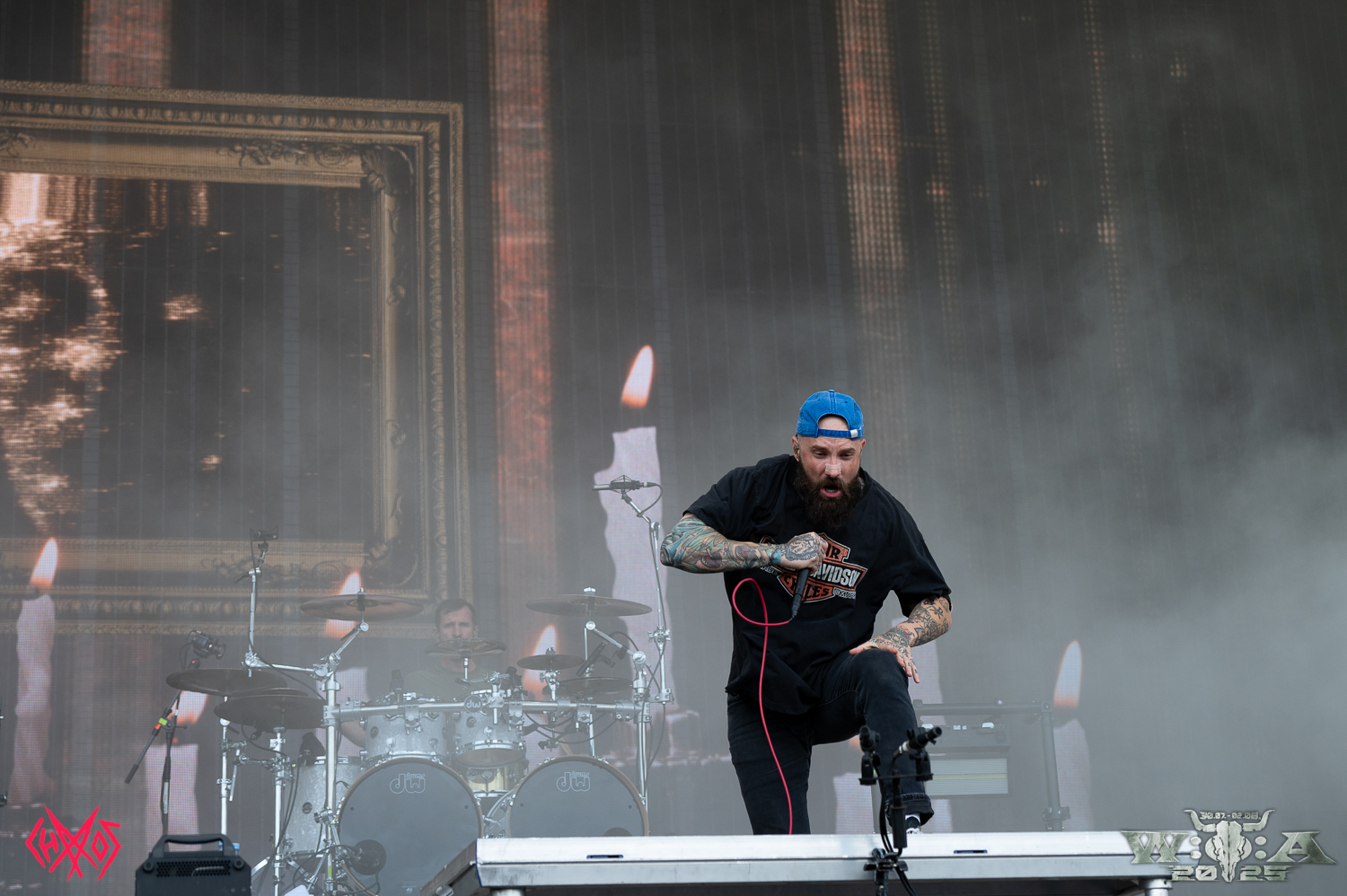
August Burns Red at Wacken Open Air 2025

From January to March of 2022, August Burns Red toured North America alongside Killswitch Engage and Light the Torch. On March 25, the band announced that they had parted ways with Fearless Records and signed with SharpTone Records while also revealing that they were working on their ninth studio album with a teaser shared online. During the Summer of that year the band headlined the "Through the Thorns Tour" with We Came as Romans, Hollow Point and Void of Vision serving as support. On November 1, the band announced their tenth studio album, Death Below, which was released on March 24, 2023. At the same time, they revealed the album cover and the track list. On November 3, the band released the first single "Ancestry" featuring Jesse Leach of Killswitch Engage and its corresponding music video.

On January 25, 2023, the band unveiled the second single "Backfire" along with a music video. On February 22, one month before the album release, the band published the third single "Reckoning" featuring Spencer Chamberlain of Underoath along with an accompanying music video. The band toured during this time with support from The Devil Wears Prada and Bleed From Within. On April 10, 2024, the band re-released the song "The Cleansing" from the Death Below album featuring Lorna Shore vocalist Will Ramos. In May of that year August Burns Red went on a short US tour. The band would then release a new single titled "Exhumed" on September 13, 2024. During the Fall they supported A Day to Remember on their North American tour.

In celebration of the 20th anniversary of their debut album, Thrill Seeker the band announced on January 3, 2025, that they will release a re-recorded version of the album on January 24, 2025 with current lead vocalist and bassist Jake Luhrs and Dustin Davidson through the band's own label, ABR Records. Along with the announcement, the band released a re-recorded version of the track "Your Little Suburbia Is in Ruins". The re-recorded Thrill Seeker features guest appearances from Killswitch Engage's Adam Dutkiewicz (who was the producer on the original version of the album) and Josh McManness (who performed vocals on the original version of the album) and was produced by Carson Slovak and Grant McFarland. On January 17, 2025, the band released a re-recorded version of the track "Barbarian" which featured guest vocals from Josh McManness. In the Summer of 2025, the band held a Summer European tour with Unprocessed serving as support.

=== Season of Surrender (2025–present) ===
On September 29, 2025, the band revealed they had entered the studio to begin recording their eleventh studio album with new music to be released in 2026. On November 21, 2025, Luhrs announced that he had completed recording vocals for the upcoming album. August Burns Red played the 2026 Emo's Not Dead Cruise, which ran from January 22 to January 26th. It showcased a variety of their musical catalog.

On February 20, 2026, the band released a new single "Behemoth", and along with the release it was announced that the band had re-signed with Fearless Records. On March 27, the band released another new single "The Nameless", and also announced the title of their new album Season of Surrender to be released on June 5, 2026 via Fearless Records, along with the tracklist of the album revealing features from Mike Hranica of The Devil Wears Prada, Jamie Hails of Polaris and Make Them Suffer, with the album once again being produced by Carson Slovak and Grant McFarland. Luhrs also commented on the album: "This album is rooted in traditional August Burns Red and I think it's the heaviest album we've written in a long time." August Burns Red will promote the album with a tour through Australia and New Zealand in September and October 2026, with guest bands Bloom and I Promised the World.

== Artistry ==
=== Musical style and influences ===
August Burns Red is generally credited as a metalcore, melodic metalcore, progressive metalcore, and Christian metalcore band. The band's songs frequently feature highly melodic guitar riffs, technical or odd time signatures and breakdowns, with a variety of influences including Meshuggah, Symphony in Peril, Pelican, Slayer and The Dillinger Escape Plan, as well as Between the Buried and Me, Misery Signals and Hopesfall.

While the group has stated that they don't mind being classified as metalcore, Brubaker has grown a distaste for many of the genre's bands: "I feel like anyone who can pick up and play a guitar and learn to play a metalcore riff and any drummer who can learn to play a thrash beat over a breakdown is doing it. It's almost become very formulaic, and metal to me was never a formulaic genre." Musically, the group has incorporated instrumentals such as the cello and the violin while also featuring song elements such as classical music inspired interludes, pushing the boundaries of what is considered 'metalcore'. Many of their songs do not contain choruses. In 2026, vocalist Jake Luhrs commented on the bands style stating "I feel like we're a technical, progressive, American metalcore band, and lyrically I think we've always been that band that tries to shine some hope or dig a little deeper into something of substance, something that carries a little weight versus just maybe a very basic topic or formulaic style of writing."

Much of the band’s material musically is written by lead guitarist JB Brubaker including rhythms, fills and leads. However the process for their lyrical content is democratic, with every member of the band writing lyrics and the group then voting on what topics should be featured on the album.

=== Band name ===
August Burns Red members have been asked about the origin of their band name on many occasions and have given numerous different stories. The most popular story behind the name is an incident involving Jon Hershey, the band's original vocalist, when he dated a woman named August who burned his dog Redd alive in his dog house.

However, it was later revealed in a radio interview that this story, and the others, was simply a joke and that there is no actual meaning behind the band's name. Drummer Matt Greiner stated in the interview that they "just came up with the name to come up with a name".

=== Christianity ===
For a significant part of the band's history, August Burns Red was widely considered a Christian band. JB Brubaker mentioned in an interview with online magazine Shout! that "Christianity is a religion and not a style of music" and that he would "rather just let the music speak for itself". Brent Rambler commented, "It is important to us that people know that we are indeed Christians ... without having us stand up there and ram it down people's throats."

JB Brubaker responded to a 2015 interview question about the band's reaction to being labeled as a Christian metal band by explaining that the presence of Christianity varies in each of the members' lives, but then saying, "We decided years ago that we were not going to be an 'evangelical band.' We're not onstage to bring people to God, that's not our purpose up there. Our number one purpose in ABR is to entertain." In a 2014 interview, Jake Luhrs responded to a similar question by saying, "No, we are not a Christian band because, in my eyes, and I'm a believer in Jesus Christ...that doesn't mean because all of us are Christians we are now a Christian band."

Brent Rambler said in a 2016 interview, "We don't preach from stage, and we made the active choice that this band is about music, and being a positive influence. Since a lot of people correlate Christianity for positivity, that label has stuck with us." Some members have later stated in interviews that not all of the band are Christian, and they now just hope to spread positive messages in their music and lyrics, whether they are perceived as spreading a Christian message or not. In a 2019 podcast, Matt Greiner stated that the band decided to drop their Christian label in 2012, after disputes within the band over what kind of message they were trying to spread, and whether their main intention was to make music or to spread a Christian message. Although the decision initially was met with disapproval by Greiner and Luhrs, members of the band continue to state that August Burns Red is not a Christian band.

== Band members ==
August Burns Red live at Elbriot 2017

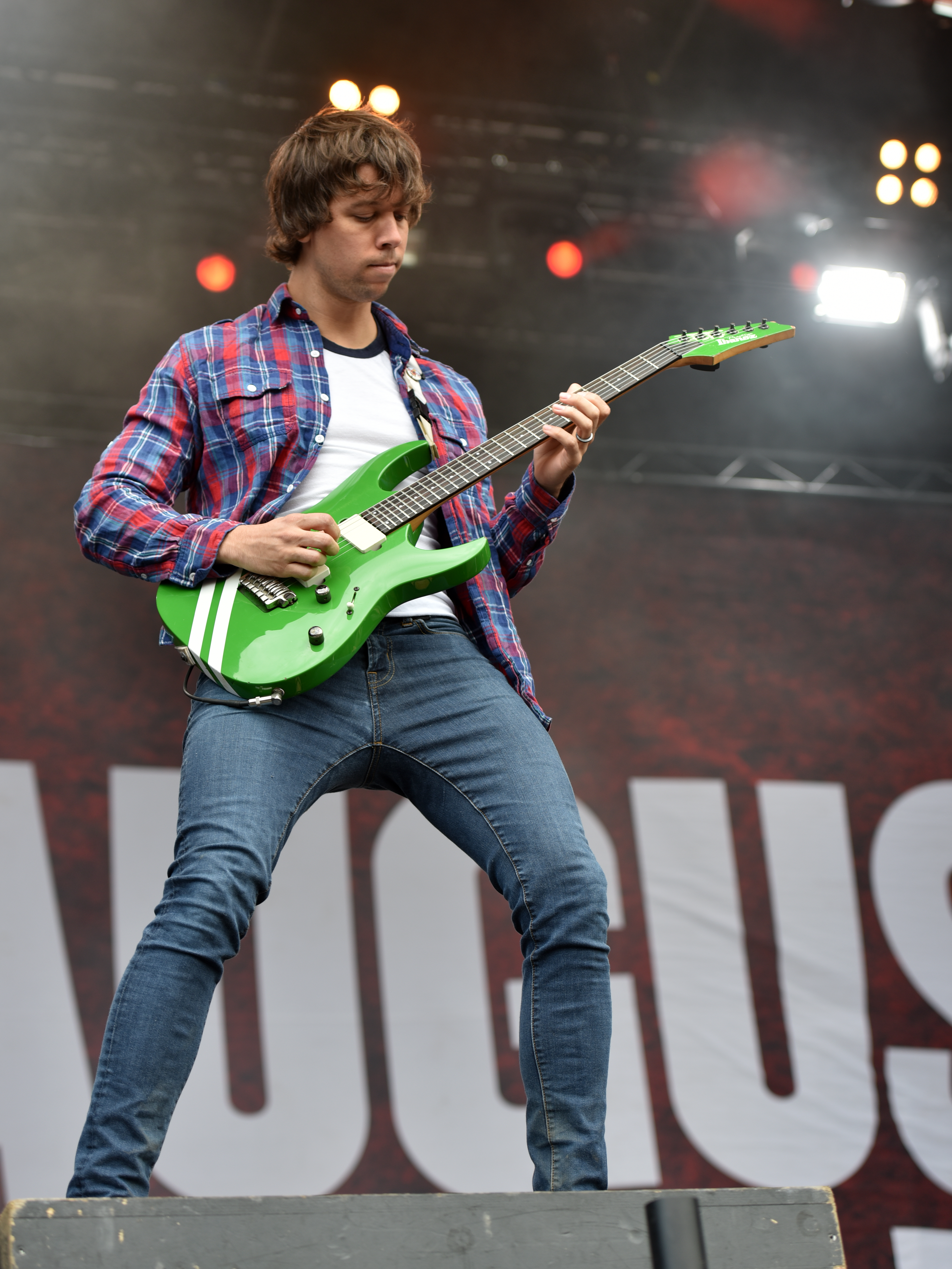
JB Brubaker

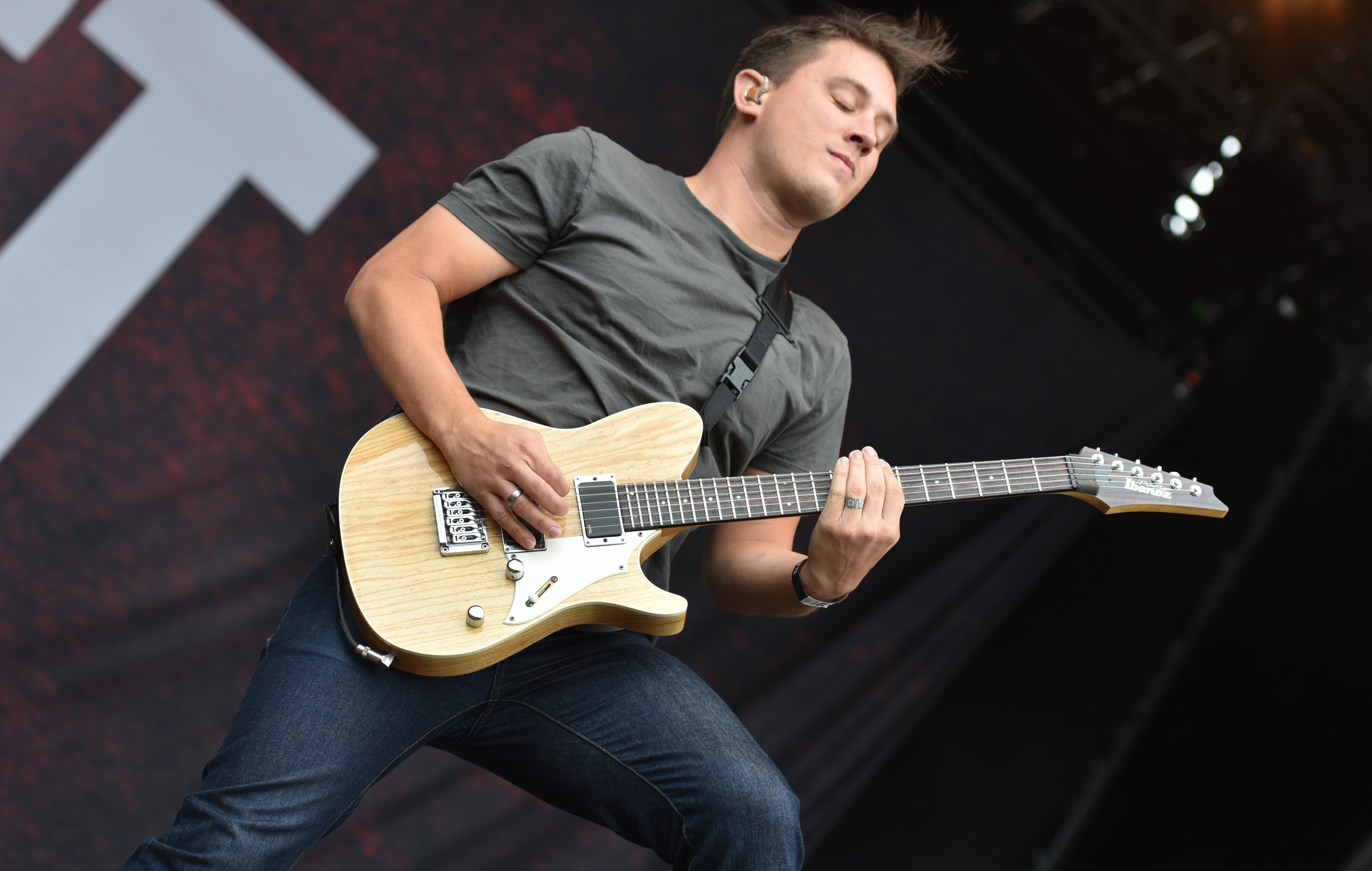
Brent Rambler

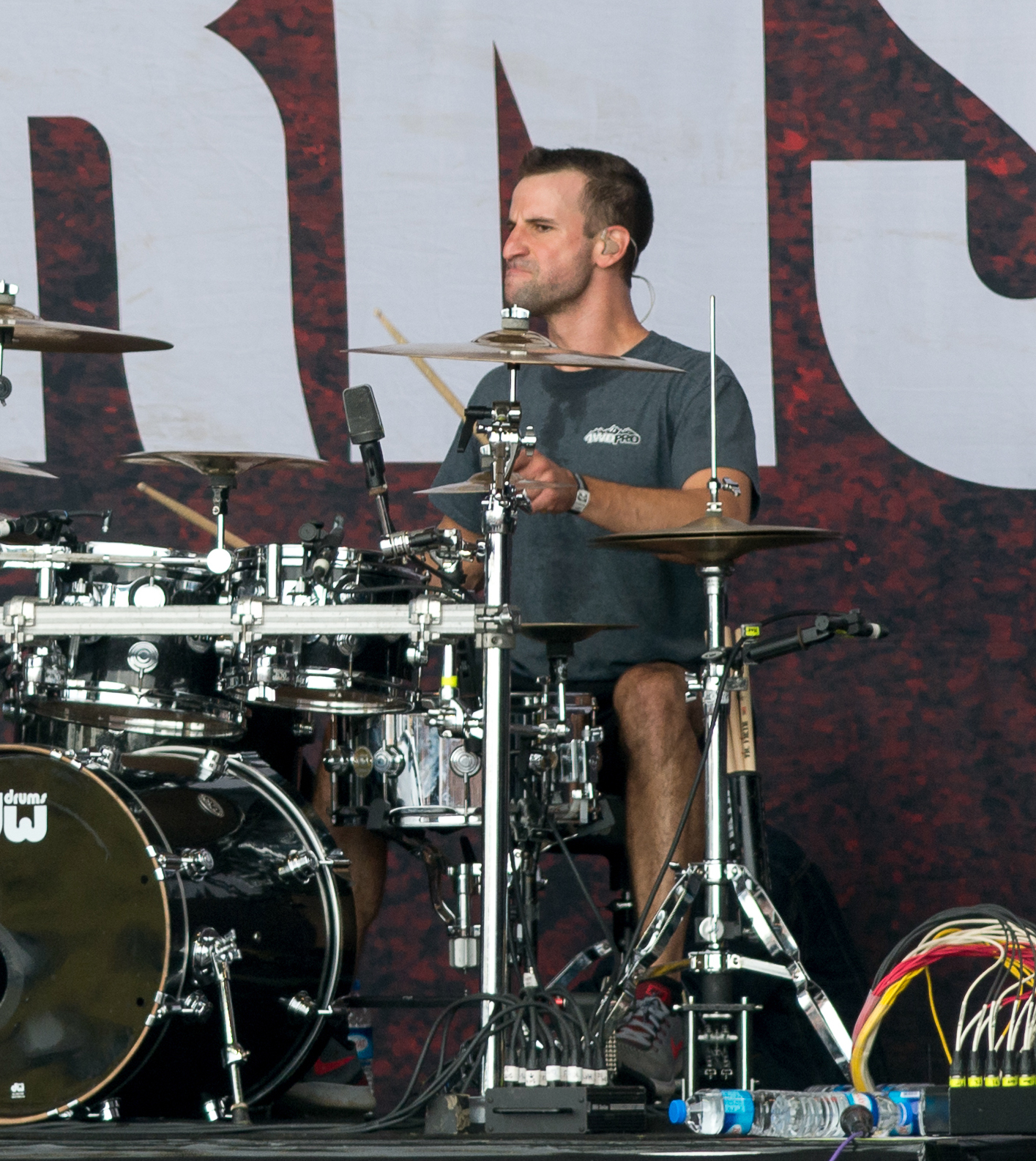
Matt Greiner

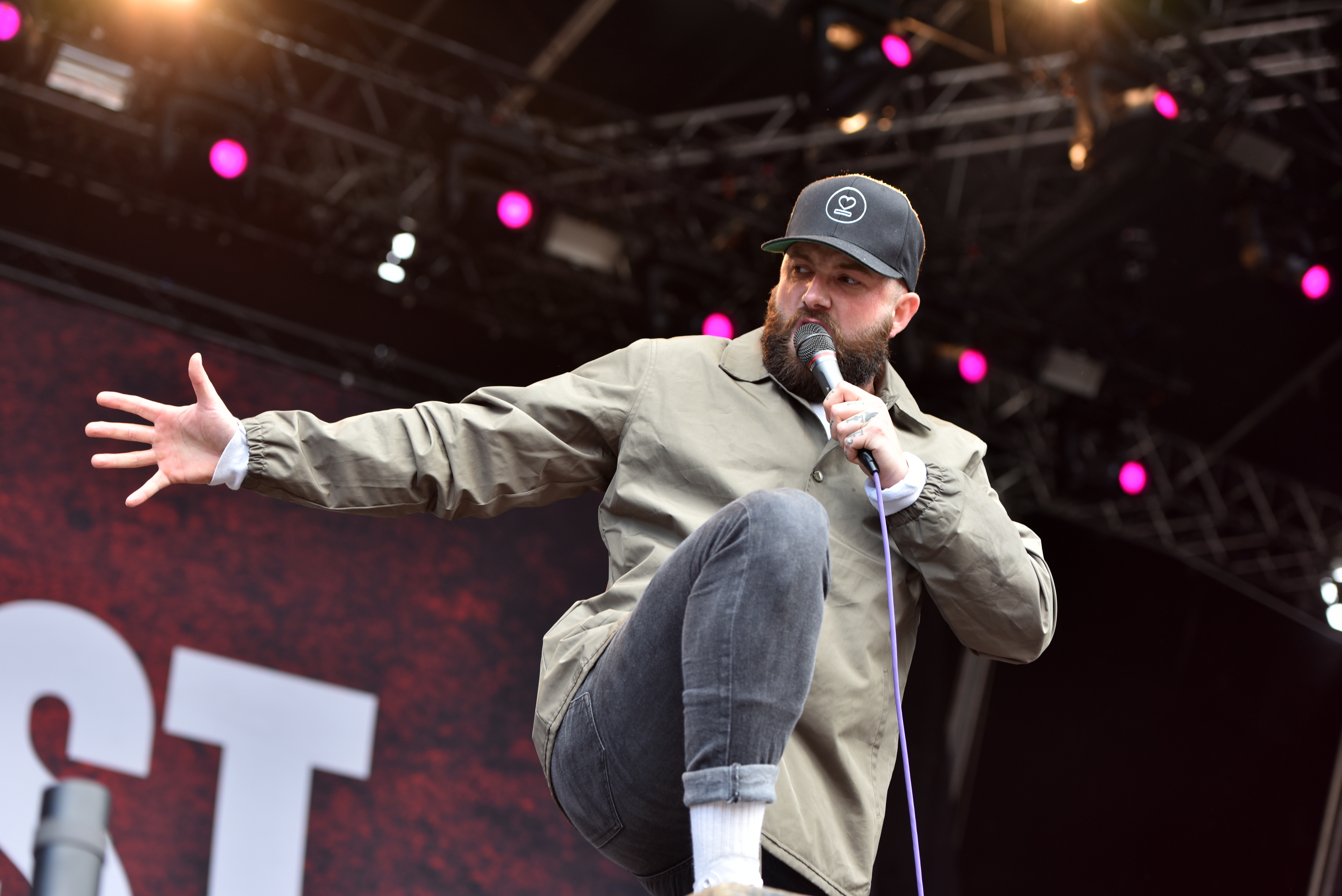
Jake Luhrs

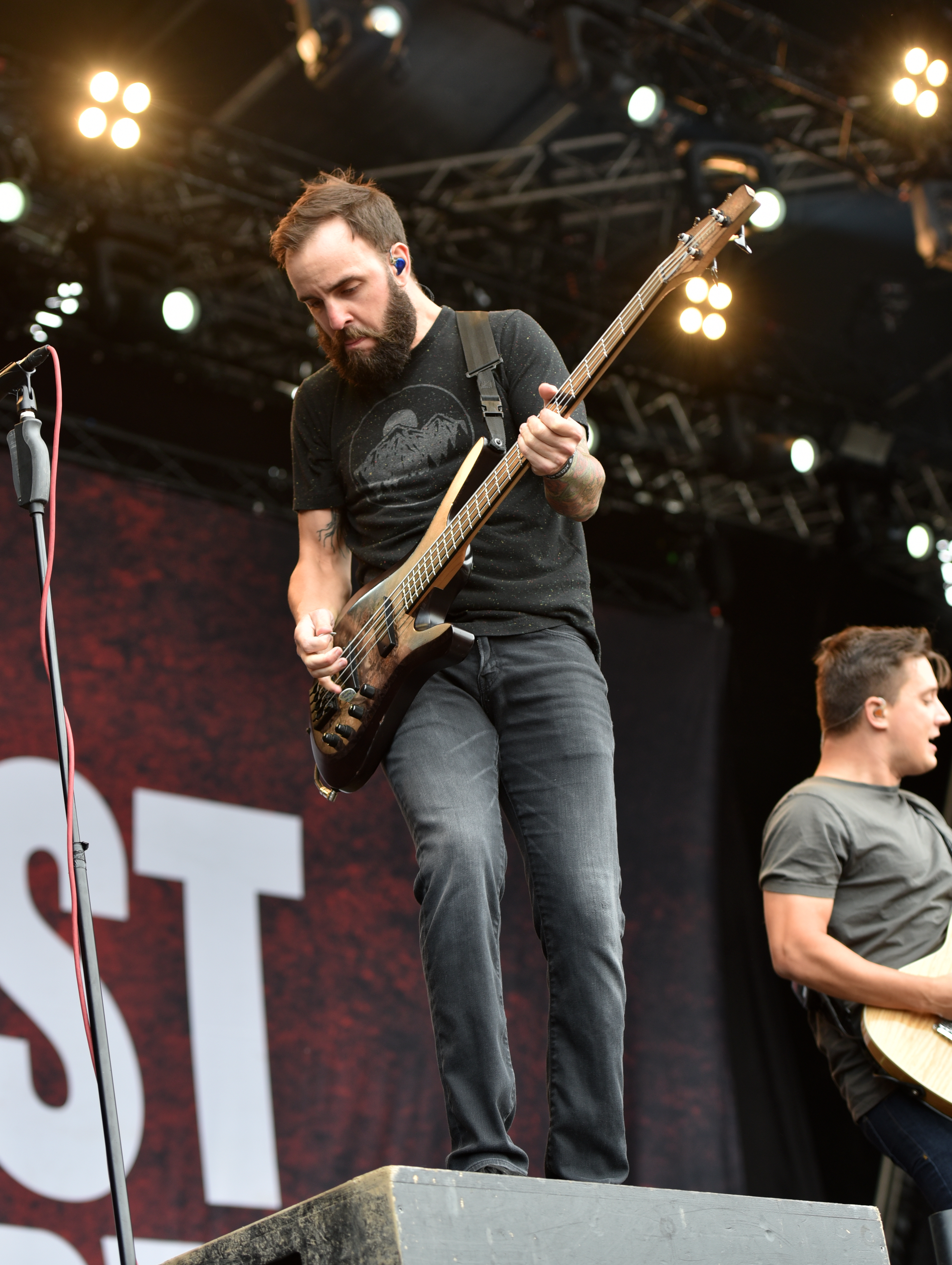
Dustin Davidson

Current

- John Benjamin "JB" Brubaker – lead guitar (2003–present)
- Brent Rambler – rhythm guitar (2003–present)
- Matt Greiner – drums, piano (2003–present)
- Jake Luhrs – lead vocals (2006–present)
- Dustin Davidson – bass, backing vocals (2006–present)

Former

- Jon Hershey – lead vocals (2003–2004)
- Josh McManness – lead vocals (2004–2006)
- Jordan Tuscan – bass (2003–2006)

Touring

- Adam Gray – drums (2016, 2023)
- Michael Felker – vocals (2021)

== Discography ==
- Thrill Seeker (2005)
- Messengers (2007)
- Constellations (2009)
- Leveler (2011)
- August Burns Red Presents: Sleddin' Hill (2012)
- Rescue & Restore (2013)
- Found in Far Away Places (2015)
- Phantom Anthem (2017)
- Guardians (2020)
- Death Below (2023)
- Season of Surrender (2026)

== Awards and nominations ==
Grammy Awards

Year	Nominee / work	Award	Result
2016	"Identity"	Best Metal Performance	Nominated
2018	"Invisible Enemy"	Best Metal Performance	Nominated

Loudwire Music Awards

Year	Nominee / work	Award	Result
2013	"Fault Line"	Cage Match Hall of Fame	Won
2017	Matt Greiner	Best Drummer	Nominated

Alternative Press Music Awards

Year	Nominee / work	Award	Result
2014	Matt Greiner	Best Drummer	Nominated
2014	JB Brubaker	Best Guitarist	Nominated
2015	Jake Luhrs	Artist Philanthropic Award	Nominated
2016	JB Brubaker	Best Guitarist	Nominated
2016	"Identity"	Best Music Video	Nominated
2016	Jake Luhrs (HeartSupport)	Artist Philanthropic Award	Won
2016	Found in Far Away Places	Album of the Year	Nominated

GMA Dove Awards

Year	Nominee / work	Award	Result
2010	Constellations	Best Rock Album	Nominated
2012	Leveler (Deluxe Edition)	Recorded Music Packaging	Nominated

Central Pennsylvania Music Hall of Fame

Year	Nominee / work	Award	Result
2025	August Burns Red	Hall of Fame	Inducted
