= HeartSupport =

Mental health nonprofit

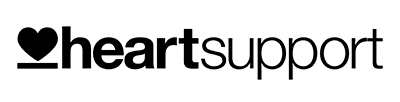
- Formation: 2011; 15 years ago
- Founder: Jake Luhrs
- Type: Non-profit
- Tax ID no.: 46-4342239
- Headquarters: Round Rock, Texas, U.S.
- Website: www.heartsupport.com

YouTube information
- Channel: HeartSupport
- Genre: interview

HeartSupport is a mental health-based non-profit organization that offers peer support to help individuals within the metal community who struggle with their mental health. The non-profit was founded by Jake Luhrs, vocalist of the band August Burns Red, in 2011. Their mission statement is "Heal The Scene".

== History ==
HeartSupport was founded by Jake Luhrs in 2011 after fans shared their personal traumas with him while he ran August Burns Red's merch booth. Inspired by these conversations, Luhrs wanted to create a supportive community where people, including fans he had already connected with, could share their stories.

In 2013, HeartSupport toured with August Burns Red during the Vans Warped Tour of that year.

In 2016, HeartSupport's founder, Jake Luhrs, won the Artist Philanthropic Award at the APMA Awards for his work with the organization.

In a 2020 Revolver article, it was reported that HeartSupport had six full-time employees, over a hundred volunteers, and approximately five hundred thousand users per month interacting with the nonprofit through its support forum and social media.

HeartSupport organized a Twitch live stream in support of World Suicide Prevention Day in 2021, titled Choose Life. The stream featured performances and interviews from musical artists such as Brian Welch, Lacey Sturm, We Came as Romans, and more.

In 2023, the organization hosted HeartSupport Fest in Orlando, Florida. The event was a mission-based metal music festival focusing on "diversity, acceptance, inclusion, self-love and self-care, and mental health as priority." The festival was headlined by Rise Against and Parkway Drive.
