= Thrill Seeker =

Studio album by August Burns Red
- Released: November 8, 2005
- Recorded: 2005
- Studios: Dark Horse Studio, Franklin, Tennessee
- Genre: Christian metalcore
- Length: 44:43; 47:38 (20th Anniversary Edition)
- Labels: Solid State; ABR (20th Anniversary Edition)
- Producers: Adam Dutkiewicz; Carson Slovak; Grant McFarland; (20th Anniversary Edition)

August Burns Red chronology
Looks Fragile After All (2004)	Thrill Seeker (2005)	Messengers (2007)

20th Anniversary Edition cover

Singles from Thrill Seeker: 20th Anniversary Edition
- 1. "Your Little Suburbia Is in Ruins" Released: January 3, 2025; 2. "Barbarian" Released: January 17, 2025

Thrill Seeker is the debut studio album by American metalcore band August Burns Red. It was released on November 8, 2005 through Solid State Records and was produced by Adam Dutkiewicz. A music video was released for the opening track "Your Little Suburbia Is in Ruins".

Thrill Seeker is the band's last release to feature original bassist Jordan Tuscan and the only release with vocalist Josh McManness, as they both would later depart from the band the following year with Dustin Davidson and Jake Luhrs taking their positions respectively. An unreleased track, "Pride & Humility", was featured on This is Solid State Vol. 6.

== Background ==
August Burns Red released its debut EP, Looks Fragile After All, was released on August 24, 2004 through CI Records. Later that year, vocalist Jon Hershey left the band and was replaced by Josh McManness. After months of performing with McManness, the band would be signed to Solid State Records in 2005.

== Critical reception ==
Professional ratings
Review scores
Source	Rating
AbsolutePunk	88%
Indie Vision Music	5/10
Jesus Freak Hideout	4/5 stars

Thrill Seeker received mixed to positive reviews upon release.

Sean Lex of Jesus Freak Hideout praised the band's musicianship and complimented the band's sound as being "way more mature than their age. They've got the sound of a metal band that's been around for a few album releases." Lex did criticize some of the lyrics for being cynical and feeling like a "emocore diary entry" and stated that some of the music was formulaic. A mixed review came from Indie Vision Music, with the review stating Thrill Seeker adds little to the hardcore/metalcore scene, but also said the album "is not entirely a waste of time", praising the closing track "The Seventh Trumpet".

In 2020, the band celebrated the album's 15th anniversary with a virtual livestream concert, with no fans in attendance due to the COVID-19 pandemic. They performed the album in its entirety, featuring a guest appearance from both McManness and Tuscan. This performance was later made available to stream as an album.

== 20th Anniversary Edition ==
On August 26, 2024, the band announced that they had entered the studio and were re-recording Thrill Seeker with current vocalist Jake Luhrs. The re-recorded version of the album, produced by Carson Slovak and Grant McFarland, and includes guest appearances by Adam Dutkiewicz on "Speech Impediment" and Josh McManness on "Barbarian". On January 3, 2025, the band released the re-recorded version of "Your Little Suburbia Is in Ruins" and announced the re-recorded album will be released on January 24 through the band's own label, ABR Records. A re-recorded version of "Barbarian" was released on January 17, 2025.

== Track listing ==
All tracks are written by August Burns Red.

No.	Title	Length
1.	"Your Little Suburbia Is in Ruins"	3:58
2.	"Speech Impediment"	4:01
3.	"Endorphins"	3:10
4.	"Too Late for Roses"	3:19
5.	"Barbarian"	3:45
6.	"The Reflective Property"	3:51
7.	"A Wish Full of Dreams"	2:58
8.	"Consumer"	4:10
9.	"A Shot Below the Belt"	4:10
10.	"Eve of the End" (instrumental)	3:09
11.	"The Seventh Trumpet"	8:12
Total length:		44:43

15th anniversary vinyl bonus track
No.	Title	Length
12.	"Pride & Humility"	2:37

Thrill Seeker: 20th Anniversary Edition
No.	Title	Length
1.	"Your Little Suburbia Is in Ruins"	4:05
2.	"Speech Impediment" (feat. Adam Dutkiewicz)	4:03
3.	"Endorphins"	3:12
4.	"Too Late for Roses"	3:21
5.	"Barbarian" (feat. Josh McManness)	3:49
6.	"The Reflective Property"	3:52
7.	"A Wish Full of Dreams"	2:59
8.	"Consumer"	4:10
9.	"A Shot Below the Belt"	4:04
10.	"Eve of the End" (Instrumental)	3:18
11.	"The Seventh Trumpet"	8:04
12.	"Pride & Humility"	2:41
Total length:		47:38

== Personnel ==
August Burns Red

- Josh McManness – vocals
- JB Brubaker – lead guitar
- Brent Rambler – rhythm guitar
- Jordan Tuscan – bass
- Matt Greiner – drums, piano

Additional personnel

- Adam Dutkiewicz – production, engineering, mixing
- Wayne Krupa – engineering
- Troy Glessner – mastering
- Asterik Studio – art direction, design
- Dave Hill – band photography

== 20th Anniversary Edition personnel ==
August Burns Red

- Jake Luhrs – vocals
- JB Brubaker – lead guitar
- Brent Rambler – rhythm guitar
- Dustin Davidson – bass
- Matt Greiner – drums, piano

Additional musicians

- Adam Dutkiewicz – guitar solo on "Speech Impediment"
- Josh McManness – additional vocals on "Barbarian"

Additional personnel

- Carson Slovak – production
- Grant McFarland – production

== Charts ==
Chart (2025)	Peak position
Top Christian Albums (Billboard)	32
