= August Burns Red Presents: Sleddin' Hill =

August Burns Red Presents: Sleddin' Hill, A Holiday Album

Studio album by August Burns Red
- Released: October 9, 2012
- Recorded: March 12–30, 2012
- Studio: Atrium Studios, Lancaster, PA
- Genre: Melodic metalcore; Christmas music
- Length: 42:06
- Label: Solid State
- Producer: Carson Slovak

August Burns Red chronology
Leveler (2011)	August Burns Red Presents: Sleddin' Hill, A Holiday Album (2012)	Rescue & Restore (2013)

Singles from Sleddin' Hill
- 1. "Sleigh Ride" Released: September 18, 2012

August Burns Red Presents: Sleddin' Hill, A Holiday Album is the fifth studio album, the first Christmas album and the first instrumental (Note: The tracks "Rudolph the Red-Nosed Reindeer" and "Joy to the World" both feature vocals.) album by American metalcore band August Burns Red. It was released on October 9, 2012, through Solid State Records and was produced by Carson Slovak.

== Background ==
The album was announced on Solid State's website on August 7, 2012.

Despite being mainly an instrumental album, several tracks feature vocals ("Rudolph the Red-Nosed Reindeer" and "Joy to the World").

Discussing the album, lead guitarist J.B. Brubaker said he was able "to get a little more wild" with his influences and that one of the solos was an ode to Blue Album-era Weezer. He also said that his punk influences are evident all over the album.

"Flurries" was the first song released from the album for streaming. It was released online on August 31, 2012.

"Sleigh Ride" was the second song released from the album. It was released on September 18, 2012 to online retailers. The song was one of the last songs to be recorded for the album due to "its crazy song structure and various key changes", guitarist J.B. Brubaker said. The song features a jazz section in the middle with a horn section.

Professional ratings
Review scores
Source	Rating
HM Magazine	4/5 stars
Jesus Freak Hideout	4.5/5 stars
Metal Injection	Positive

== Track listing ==
All songs arranged by JB Brubaker. All songs are public domain, unless otherwise stated.

No.	Title	Writer(s)	Length
1.	"Flurries"	JB Brubaker	4:17
2.	"Frosty the Snowman"	S. Nelson & J. Rollins	2:18
3.	"Sleigh Ride"	Leroy Anderson	2:53
4.	"God Rest Ye Merry Gentlemen" (remastered)	Traditional/Unknown	2:50
5.	"Jingle Bells"	James Lord Pierpont	4:13
6.	"Oh Holy Night"	Adolphe Adam	4:24
7.	"Rudolph the Red-Nosed Reindeer"	Johnny Marks	1:59
8.	"Sleddin' Hill"	Brubaker	2:38
9.	"Little Drummer Boy" (remastered)	Katherine Kennicott Davis, Henry Onorati & Harry Simeone	4:19
10.	"Winter Wonderland"	Felix Bernard	1:55
11.	"O Come, O Come, Emmanuel" (remastered)	Traditional/Unknown	4:55
12.	"Carol of the Bells" (2012)	Mykola Leontovych	2:48
13.	"We Wish You a Merry Christmas"	Traditional/Unknown	2:30
Total length:			42:06

2013 re-release bonus track
No.	Title	Writer(s)	Length
14.	"Dance of the Sugar Plum Fairy"	Pyotr Ilyich Tchaikovsky	2:47

2014 re-release bonus track
No.	Title	Writer(s)	Length
14.	"Joy to the World"	Isaac Watts	3:07

== Personnel ==
Credits adapted from AllMusic.

August Burns Red

- Jake Luhrs – vocals (track 7)
- JB Brubaker – lead guitar, vocals, banjo (track 7)
- Brent Rambler – rhythm guitar, vocals (track 7)
- Dustin Davidson – bass, vocals (track 7)
- Matt Greiner – drums, piano, vocals (track 7)

Additional musicians

- Zachary Veilleux – piano (track 3)
- Taylor Brandt – violin (tracks 3, 6, 7 & 13)
- Ailie Herr – additional violin (track 13)
- Grant MacFarland – additional drums and percussion (tracks 3 & 5), cello (tracks 6 & 13)
- Jason Welsh – tuba (track 13), trumpet (tracks 3 & 13)
- Lancaster Bible College Vocal Choir – vocals (track 6)
- Dr. Robert Bigley – vocal choir writing, direction (track 6)

Additional personnel

- Carson Slovak – production

== Charts ==
Chart (2012)	Peak position
US Billboard 200	147
US Christian Albums (Billboard)	8
US Hard Rock Albums (Billboard)	14
