= Matt Greiner =

American drummer

- Greiner at Wacken Open Air in 2025

Background information
- Born: Matthew Greiner; October 28, 1985 (age 41)
- Origin: Manheim, Pennsylvania, U.S.
- Genres: Metalcore; Christian metal
- Occupation: Musician
- Instruments: Drums, piano
- Years active: 2003–present
- Member of: August Burns Red

Matthew Wilson Greiner (born October 28, 1985) is an American drummer, best known as a founding member of the metalcore band August Burns Red. In 2012, he also cofounded the drum company Greiner&Kilmer with fellow drummer Kaleb Kilmer. Greiner is an outspoken Christian. While Greiner is best known for his drumming, he also plays the piano.

== Career ==
Greiner first started playing drums in his church at the age of 15. In 2003, while still in high school he started his musical career. Lead guitarist JB Brubaker hired him, rhythm guitarist Brent Rambler, bassist Jordan Tuscan and lead vocalist Jon Hershey to help form the band August Burns Red. The band formed in March 2003 in Greiner's basement.

The band recorded the Looks Fragile After All EP in 2004 and was released by CI Records, a label local to where Greiner and the members lived. In 2005, Vocalist Jon Hershey left the band to eventually start Bells. He was replaced by Josh McManness. After McManness joined, the band signed to Solid State Records. On November 8, 2005, ABR released their debut album, titled Thrill Seeker. After the album was released, Greiner started endorsing Truth Custom Drums. In 2006, McManness and Tuscan left the band, and were replaced by Jake Luhrs and Dustin Davidson.

On June 19, 2007, the band released their sophomore album, Messengers on Solid State. The album did extremely well and sold 108,000 copies by May 2011. Throughout 2008, the band toured with bands such as As I Lay Dying, Misery Signals, A Skylit Drive, and This or the Apocalypse. On February 24, 2009, the band released some of the tracks that were not released with Messengers, titled Lost Messengers: The Outtakes. Constellations came out later in the year of 2009. The band released Leveler in 2011 and August Burns Red Presents: Sleddin' Hill, a Christmas album, in 2012. In 2011, Greiner started Greiner&Kilmer with local drummer and woodworker Kaleb Kilmer. On October 25, 2011, the Christian hardcore band, Life in Your Way released their fifth studio album, Kingdoms, which Greiner produced the drums.

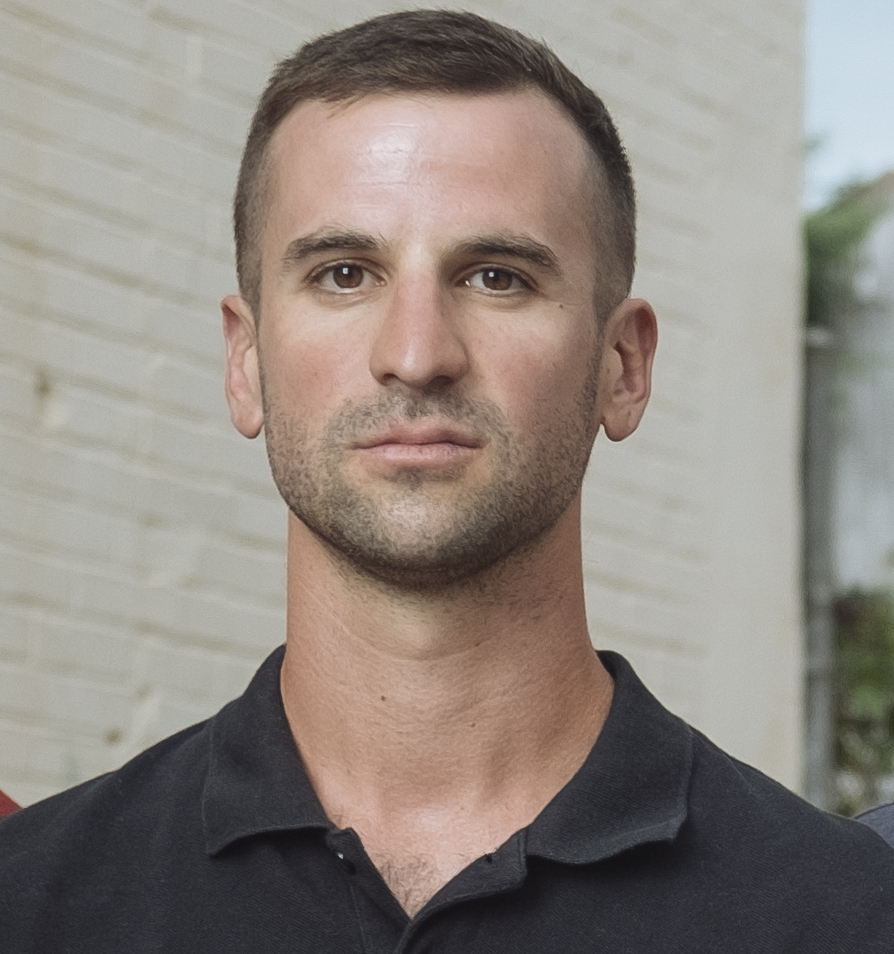
Greiner in 2017

The album also features Greiner's fellow ABR member, Jake Luhrs. On May 13, 2013, the Metalcore band, Texas in July released their self titled album. Greiner was featured on the album's final track, "Cloudy Minds". Later, on June 25, 2013, ABR released their sixth full-length album, called Rescue & Restore. The album did extremely well, charting very high on the Billboard charts. In 2014, ABR's only development, announced they had left Solid State Records to sign to Fearless Records and the band's new album, Found in Far Away Places, would be available for pre-order on April 13, 2015 along with their new single "The Wake". On June 29, 2015, the band released Found in Far Away Places on Fearless. The band was Grammy nominated for "Best Metal Performance" for their songs "Identity" and "Invisible Enemy".

In 2020, he founded Matt Greiner Lessons, an online drumming website where he teaches double bass and breaks down August Burns Red songs along with hosting drummer hangouts.

He currently uses Evans drumheads; Vic Firth (Matt Greiner signature sticks); Zildjian (including his signature Zildjian FX Blast Bell); DW drums.

== Legacy ==
Greiner is considered a highly influential drummer. In the Christian metal genre, Greiner, as well as Lance Garvin (Living Sacrifice, Soul Embraced), Brandon Trahan (Impending Doom, xDeathstarx), and Ted Kirkpatrick (Tourniquet, Trouble) are thought to be the most influential drummers for the genre.

== Personal life ==
Greiner is an outspoken Christian. He was homeschooled as a child, which gave him more time to practice drumming. On the album Constellations, the song "Indonesia" was written as a tribute to David Clapper, who was Greiner's second cousin. Greiner was raised on Contemporary Christian music and he grew up going to festivals such as Cornerstone, Creation, and Purple Door. He also spent time attending micro sprint races with his family and would listen to NASCAR on weekends.

Since 2012, Greiner has sporadically posted drumming videos on his Youtube Channel.

In January of 2026, Greiner missed August Burns Red performance on the Emo's Not Dead cruise due the birth of he and his wife’s second child.

== Discography ==
=== August Burns Red ===
- Thrill Seeker (2005)
- Messengers (2007)
- Constellations (2009)
- Leveler (2011)
- August Burns Red Presents: Sleddin' Hill (2012)
- Rescue & Restore (2013)
- Found in Far Away Places (2015)
- Phantom Anthem (2017)
- Guardians (2020)
- Death Below (2023)
- Season of Surrender (2026)

=== Guest appearances ===
- Texas in July by Texas in July (2013)
- Kingdoms by Life in Your Way (2011)
