= Found in Far Away Places =

Studio album by August Burns Red
- Released: June 29, 2015
- Genres: Metalcore, progressive metal
- Length: 52:21
- Label: Fearless
- Producers: Carson Slovak, Grant McFarland

August Burns Red chronology
Rescue & Restore (2013)	Found in Far Away Places (2015)	Phantom Anthem (2017)

Singles from Found in Far Away Places
- 1. "The Wake" Released: April 13, 2015; 2. "Identity" Released: May 26, 2015

Found in Far Away Places is the seventh studio album by American metalcore band August Burns Red. It was released on June 29, 2015 through Fearless Records and was produced by Carson Slovak and Grant McFarland. It is their first release on the label. The album sold 29,000 copies in its first week debuting at number 9 on the Billboard 200.

On December 7, 2015, the single "Identity" was nominated for a Grammy Award in the Best Metal Performance category, making it the band's first Grammy nomination.

== Background and recording ==
On August 14, 2014, it was announced August Burns Red had signed with Fearless Records. On November 5, 2014, it was announced the band had begun the recording process for seventh studio album with the drums being tracked at Atrium Audio in Lancaster, Pennsylvania.

The album title was taken from a lyric in "Majoring in the Minors". In an interview with Outburn, guitarist JB Brubaker stated that the song was about touring all over the world and experiencing new things, making them the band they are today. Unlike their previous releases the main focus of the album’s lyrical content focuses on social issues. Guitarist Brent Rambler noted that the writing process was very democratic, with every member of the band writing lyrics for the album and the group then voted on what topics should be featured on the album. "The Wake" focuses on humanity and the destruction of the earth, via misuse of resources. The lyrics to "Identity" were based on the coming out of a friend.

When asked on the meaning of the albums title Brubaker responded:

Found In Far Away Places talks to me about where our band came from and how we got to where we are. After being in the band for all these years and having so many experiences together and basically traveling around the world together we sort of found out who we are as people, as a band and as friends.

The albums cover art was created by Ryan Clark, the artwork consists of Clark’s vision of the album’s title.

== Release and promotion ==
On March 30, 2015, the band uploaded a brief audio clip from the new album on their social media accounts. "The Wake" was the first song to be released from the album, debuting on April 13, 2015. A lyric video was uploaded via Fearless Records' YouTube channel, with a digital single being released that same day. Metalsucks reviewer Axl Rosenburg responded positively to the track and commended the band on "keeping shit heavy when so many of their peers have gone in the other direction."

On May 26, 2015, the second single "Identity" was released, a music video for the song was later released on August 13, 2015. This was followed by the third and final single "Ghost" featuring A Day to Remember vocalist Jeremy McKinnon was released four days prior to the album on June 25, 2015. The songs music video was later released on October 13, 2015.

The band toured North America, Europe and Australia in support of the album.

== Critical reception ==
Professional ratings
Aggregate scores
Source	Rating
Metacritic	81/100
Review scores
Source	Rating
AbsolutePunk	9.4/10
Allmusic	4/5 stars
Alternative Press	4.5/5 stars
Cross Rhythms	9/10 squares
Exclaim!	7/10
HM Magazine	4/5 stars
Jesus Freak Hideout	4/5 stars 3.5/5 stars
Kerrang!	3/5 Ks
Metal Hammer	7/10
Outburn	9/10

Metacritic, with six ratings from selected critics, assigns a score of 81 out of 100, giving the album acclaim. Awarding the album four and a half stars from Alternative Press, Dan Slessor states, "the quintet further distinguish themselves from the metalcore pack in a manner that seems effortless." Amy Sciarretto, giving the album a nine out of ten for Outburn, writes, "August Burns Red won't have trouble finding fans—both old and new—with this latest rallying cry." Rating the album a seven out of ten at Metal Hammer, Thea de Gallier describes, "Don't be put off, though – this is, at its heart, an emotionally charged thrillride of a record." Jake Denning, awarding the album a 9.4 out of ten review by AbsolutePunk, says, "Known for their intensity and unwavering vehemence, Found In Far Away Places shows the band exploring brand new territories both instrumentally and lyrically." Giving the album a seven out of ten from Exclaim!, Bradley Zorgdrager, states, "This is the sound of a band breaking out, and they haven't sounded this fresh in over half-a-decade." Awarding the album four stars for AllMusic, James Christopher Monger writes, "That the band never lose themselves in the process of these myriad digressions is impressive to say the least, but what's most notable about Found in Far Away Places is how fluid the ride is." Kerrang!, rating the album three K's, says, "There's nothing ambitious or monumental here but a tight 50 minutes of call-to-arms rage."

Sean Huncherick, awarding the album four stars from HM Magazine, writes, "With this new album, ABR shows that the genre still has something new to offer if a band is willing to break a few boundaries. In pushing forward, August Burns Red’s musicianship leans closer to progressive metal than ever on Found in Far Away Places." Giving the album four stars at Jesus Freak Hideout, Wayne Reimer says, "Found In Far Away Places is certainly a superbly composed record, and many a fan of flawlessly manicured metalcore will no doubt love it." Michael Weaver, rating the album three and a half stars for Jesus Freak Hideout, states, "Found in Far Away Places, shows little to no growth for the band since 2011...The instrumentation on Found in Far Away Places is as good as expected, but the creativity and sound is a little lackluster."

The album was included at No. 49 on Rock Sound's top 50 releases of 2015 list.

=== Awards and nominations ===
Year	Award	Category	Result
2016	Grammy Awards	Best Metal Performance (for "Identity")	Nominated
2016	Alternative Press Music Awards	Album of the Year	Nominated

== Commercial performance ==
The album was officially released on June 29, 2015, and sold 29,000 copies in its first week debuting at number 9 on the Billboard 200. Making it their highest charting album on the mainstream chart along with their 2013 release Rescue & Restore. The album reached number one on the Top Christian albums chart, US Hard Rock, US Independent and became their first to reach number one on both the US Top Rock and US Top Rock & Alternative albums charts. Internationally the album reached number 7 on the Canadian Albums chart, while also making the chart in four other countries.

== Track listing ==
All tracks are written by August Burns Red.

Found in Far Away Places —Standard edition
No.	Title	Length
1.	"The Wake"	3:26
2.	"Martyr"	4:35
3.	"Identity"	4:19
4.	"Separating the Seas"	4:19
5.	"Ghosts" (featuring Jeremy McKinnon of A Day to Remember)	4:49
6.	"Majoring in the Minors"	4:18
7.	"Everlasting Ending" (featuring Paul Waggoner of Between the Buried and Me)	5:09
8.	"Broken Promises"	6:12
9.	"Blackwood"	4:42
10.	"Twenty-One Grams"	4:53
11.	"Vanguard"	5:39
Total length:		52:21

Found in Far Away Places —Bonus tracks for Deluxe edition
No.	Title	Length
12.	"Marathon"	4:46
13.	"Majoring in the Minors" (reprise)	4:20
14.	"Identity" (MIDI version)	4:22
Total length:		65:49

== Personnel ==
August Burns Red

- Jake Luhrs – lead vocals
- JB Brubaker – lead guitar
- Brent Rambler – rhythm guitar
- Dustin Davidson – bass, backing vocals
- Matt Greiner – drums, piano

Additional musicians

- Jeremy McKinnon of A Day to Remember – guest vocals on track 5
- Paul Waggoner of Between the Buried and Me – additional guitars on track 7

Additional personnel

- Carson Slovak – production
- Grant McFarland – production

== Charts ==
=== Weekly charts ===
Chart (2015)	Peak position
Australian Albums (ARIA)	43
Austrian Albums (Ö3 Austria)	66
Belgian Albums (Ultratop Flanders)	165
Canadian Albums (Billboard)	7
German Albums (Offizielle Top 100)	56
US Billboard 200	9
US Top Christian Albums (Billboard)	1
US Digital Albums (Billboard)	5
US Top Hard Rock Albums (Billboard)	1
US Independent Albums (Billboard)	1
US Top Rock Albums (Billboard)	1
US Vinyl Albums (Billboard)	1

=== Year-end charts ===
Chart (2015)	Position
U.S. Billboard Christian Albums	19
U.S. Billboard Hard Rock Albums	19
U.S. Billboard Independent Albums	29
U.S. Billboard Top Rock Albums	57
