= Season of Surrender =

Studio album by August Burns Red
- Released: June 5, 2026
- Genre: Metalcore
- Length: 44:44
- Label: Fearless
- Producers: Grant McFarland; Carson Slovak

August Burns Red chronology
Death Below (2023)	Season of Surrender (2026)

Singles from Season of Surrender
- 1. "Behemoth" Released: February 20, 2026; 2. "The Nameless" Released: March 27, 2026; 3. "Sonic Salvation" Released: April 27, 2026

Season of Surrender is the eleventh studio album by the American metalcore band August Burns Red. It was released on June 5, 2026, through Fearless Records.

== Background and promotion ==
On February 20, 2026, the band released the first single, "Behemoth", and its corresponding music video. On March 27, the band unveiled the second single, "The Nameless", along with a lyric video.

On April 27, the band published the third single, "Sonic Salvation", featuring Jamie Hails of Polaris along with an accompanying music video. Other guest vocalists appearing in the album include Mike Hranica of The Devil Wears Prada in the opening track "Legions" and Make Them Suffer vocalists Sean Harmanis and Alex Reade in "Cerebral Malfunction".

Vocalist Jake Luhrs has explained the idea behind the album title: "It's an emotionally driven album that connects with the listener to some degree about something they're going through, and recognizing there's a choice to make. They can take the thing that's closest to their heart and surrender it, or they can either heal from that thing and overcome it. By doing that and going through that 'season of surrender,' it's going to change the direction and course of their life very much to the point where maybe they are now living in their true identity — an individual unique purpose versus letting a traumatic thing kind of carry on in your life. What happens if you give that up? What happens if you heal from that? What kind of life would you live? That's the direction I personally wanted to go with the with the lyrics, and the songs are rippers."

August Burns Red will promote the album with a tour through Australia and New Zealand in September and October 2026, with guest bands Bloom and I Promised the World.

== Critical reception ==
Professional ratings
Review scores
Source	Rating
Blabbermouth.net	8/10
Jesus Freak Hideout	3.5/5 stars
Kerrang!	4/5
Wall of Sound	7.5/10

Blabbermouth.net wrote "They wear all of these subtle deviations from the norm lightly, but there is no mistaking the sound of a band still feverishly reinventing themselves at every opportunity. Again, they are a classy bunch, and "Season Of Surrender" is one of their classiest (and heaviest) statements to date." Jasmine Longhurst of Kerrang! also gave the album a positive review stating "Feeling much like a return to the best of mid-to-late noughties metalcore, Season of Surrender is full of aggressive percussion and squealing guitars that provide a burst of nostalgia but never feel too stuck in their ways. Not only the heaviest album the band has released in years, but one of the best, too." Wall of Sound added "It’s well balanced throughout. With so many other bands shifting sounds to incorporate other elements, August Burns Red load up their cannons and fire them all, declaring war on trends and satisfying both longtime diehards and fans who just want to snap their neck."

== Track listing ==
Season of Surrender track listing
No.	Title	Writer(s)	Length
1.	"Legions" (featuring Mike Hranica)	JB Brubaker; Jake Luhrs; Brent Rambler; Mike Hranica	4:18
2.	"The Nameless"	Dustin Davidson; Luhrs; Rambler	2:50
3.	"Behemoth"	Brubaker; Davidson; Luhrs; Rambler	3:40
4.	"Den of Thieves"	Brubaker; Davidson; Luhrs; Rambler	4:12
5.	"Sonic Salvation" (featuring Jamie Hails)	Brubaker; Luhrs; Rambler	4:13
6.	"Cerebral Malfunction" (featuring Make Them Suffer)	Brubaker; Luhrs; Rambler	4:47
7.	"Tear of the Clouds"	Davidson	0:42
8.	"Whispers Like Splinters"	Brubaker; Davidson; Luhrs; Rambler	3:48
9.	"S.O.S."	Brubaker; Luhrs; Rambler	4:27
10.	"New Horizons"	Brubaker; Luhrs; Rambler	5:02
11.	"Forged by Failure"	Brubaker; Luhrs; Rambler	6:45
Total length:			44:44

== Personnel ==
Credits are adapted from the album's liner notes and Tidal.

=== August Burns Red ===
- Jake Luhrs – vocals
- JB Brubaker – guitars
- Dustin Davidson – guitars, bass, additional engineering
- Brent Rambler – guitars
- Matthew Greiner – drums

=== Additional contributors ===
- Carson Slovak – production, engineering, mixing, mastering
- Grant McFarland – production, engineering, mixing, mastering, programming, additional vocals on "Whispers Like Splinters"
- David Salinas – illustration
- Sage LaMonica – package design
- Claire Thompson – project management
- Megan Dickinson – project management
- Mike Hranica – additional vocals on "Legions"
- Jamie Hails – additional vocals on "Sonic Salvation"
- Alex Reade – additional vocals on "Cerebral Malfunction"
- Sean Harmanis – additional vocals on "Cerebral Malfunction"

== Charts ==
Chart performance for Season of Surrender
Chart (2026)	Peak position
Australian Albums (ARIA)	85
UK Album Downloads (Official Charts)	87
UK Christian & Gospel Albums (Official Charts)	9
US Top Album Sales (Billboard)	32
US Top Christian Albums (Billboard)	5
