= Identity (August Burns Red song) =

Single by August Burns Red

from the album Found in Far Away Places
- Released: May 26, 2015
- Genre: Metalcore
- Length: 4:20
- Label: Fearless
- Songwriters: JB Brubaker; Brent Rambler; Matt Greiner; Jake Luhrs; Dustin Davidson
- Producers: Carson Slovak; Grant McFarland

August Burns Red singles chronology
"The Wake" (2015)	"Identity" (2015)	"What Child Is This? (Greensleeves)" (2016)

"Identity" is a song by American metalcore band August Burns Red. Released on May 26, 2015, it is the second single from their seventh studio album Found in Far Away Places. The song was nominated for Best Metal Performance for the 2016 Grammy Awards, losing to Cirice by Ghost. The lyrics were based on the coming out of a friend.

== Music video ==
The songs music video is a mixed media piece using custom designed illustrations along with live action footage of the band performing.

The videos director Drew Russ commented on the videos creation process stating:

All of the outlines were hand drawn (by Mike Cortada) custom for this video. Then, using a light box, the outlines were then painted over on watercolor paper, combined digitally and composited into the video. In the guitar solo section there was a combined frame-by-frame animation technique. Each frame was printed (over 300) onto watercolor paper, JB was painted over by hand (By Brian Fahey), then the paintings were scanned back into photoshop, stabilized to the original footage, and then exported as a image sequence to get the final video. All water color textures, colors, and fills were all hand painted as well.

The video was nominated in the best music video category at the 2016 Alternative Press Music Awards.

== Charts ==
Chart (2015)	Peak position
Christian Digital Songs (Billboard)	44
Hot Christian Songs (Billboard)	35
