= Jake Luhrs =

American singer (born 1985)

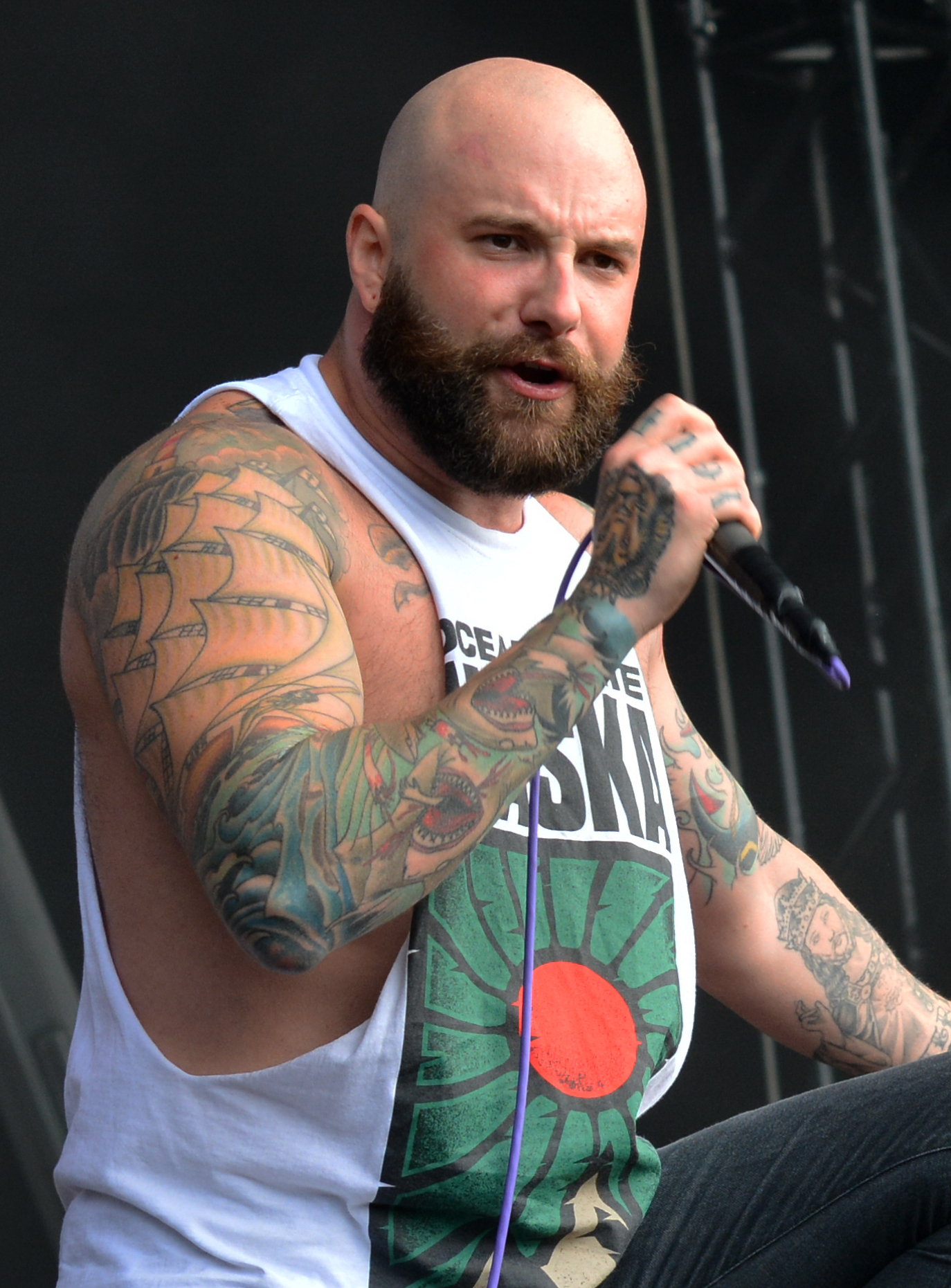
- Luhrs performing with August Burns Red in 2017

Background information
- Born: William Jacob Luhrs; February 2, 1985 (age 41); Montclair, New Jersey, U.S.
- Genres: Metalcore; Christian metal
- Occupations: Singer, businessman
- Years active: 2006–present
- Member of: August Burns Red
- Formerly of: She Walks in Beauty

William Jacob Luhrs is an American musician best known as the lead singer of the metalcore band August Burns Red. He is also the founder and president of HeartSupport, a non-profit mental health organization.

== Early life ==
Jake Luhrs was born in Montclair, New Jersey, on February 2, 1985, and grew up in South Carolina. His parents divorced when he was young, with his father moving to Virginia while he his mother and older sister had to move into government aid housing in Greenville. After spending two years in Greenville, his family settled in Columbia, South Carolina, where Luhrs spent much of his early life.

== Music career ==
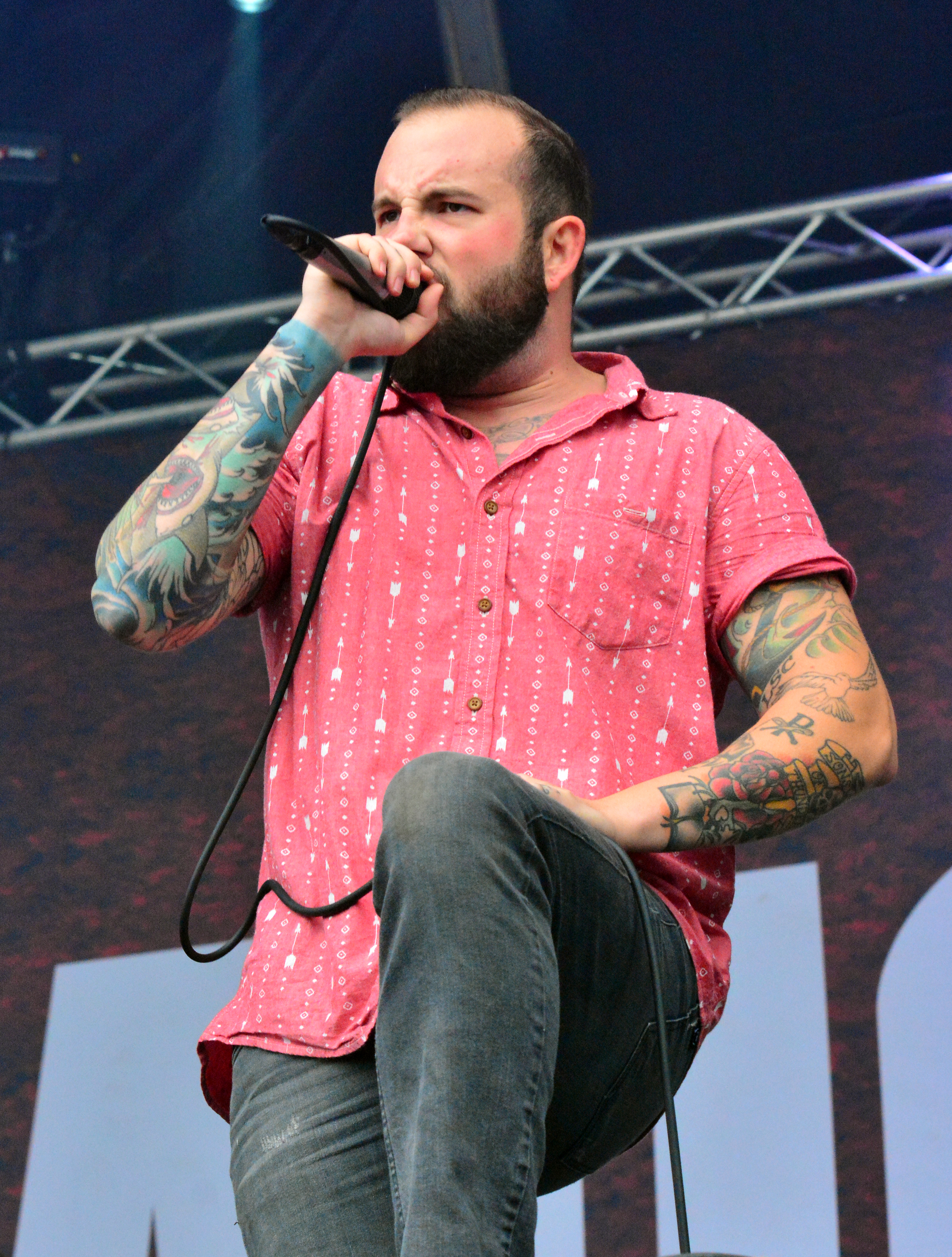
Luhrs performing at Elbriot festival 2014

Luhrs played in a number of bands and briefly attended a local technical college. In 2006 he joined August Burns Red, replacing their previous vocalist Josh McManness. Luhrs has performed on all the ABR albums except 2005's Thrill Seeker and 2003's Looks Fragile After All. With Luhrs, the band was nominated for two Grammy Awards for Best Metal Performance for their songs "Identity" and "Invisible Enemy".

Luhrs has performed both studio and live guest vocal spots for bands such as Pierce the Veil, Blessthefall, and For Today. Luhrs, along with Matt Greiner, JB Brubaker, and members of We Came as Romans and Blessthefall, appear in the video for "Save My Life" by parody metal band Amidst the Grave's Demons.

== Personal life ==
Luhrs is a devout Christian. He is a member of a non-denominational church, and was in seminary at Gordon-Conwell Theological Seminary.

In 2011, Luhrs founded HeartSupport, a mental health-based non-profit organization that offers resources and peer support to individuals within the music community dealing with addiction, anxiety, depression, mental illness, abuse, loss, suicide, and self-harm.

== Discography ==
=== August Burns Red ===
- Messengers (2007)
- Constellations (2009)
- Leveler (2011)
- August Burns Red Presents: Sleddin' Hill (2012)
- Rescue & Restore (2013)
- Found in Far Away Places (2015)
- Phantom Anthem (2017)
- Guardians (2020)
- Death Below (2023)
- Season of Surrender (2026)

=== Collaborations ===
Year	Song	Album	Artist
2011	"Ruler of the Air" (featuring Jake Luhrs)	Kingdoms	Life in Your Way
2012	"Set Apart" (featuring Jake Luhrs)	Immortal	For Today
2013	"Carry On" (featuring Jake Luhrs)	Hollow Bodies	blessthefall
2016	"Dead Memory" (featuring Jake Luhrs)	Deathgrip	Fit for a King
2017	"Delusion" (featuring Jake Luhrs)	Aqua Vitae	The Voynich Code
2019	"Redefined" (featuring Jake Luhrs)	Shaped by Fire	As I Lay Dying
2021	"God of Fire" (featuring Jake Luhrs)	Guardians of the Path	Fit for a King
2021	"When Everything Means Nothing" (featuring Jake Luhrs)	Guardians of the Path	Fit for a King
2024	"Tides" (featuring Jake Luhrs)	Apologies Are for the Weak (15th Anniversary Edition)	Miss May I
2026	"Riptide" (featuring Jake Luhrs)	Single	iamjakehill
2027	"Bloodletting" (featuring Jake Luhrs)	Borderland	Wolves at the Gate

== Awards and nominations ==
Alternative Press Music Awards
Year	Award	Result
2015	Artist Philanthropic Award	Nominated
2016	Artist Philanthropic Award	Won

== Bibliography ==
- Mountains: 25 Devotionals with Jake Luhrs (2018) ISBN 9780999154533
