= Rescue & Restore =

Studio album by August Burns Red
- Released: June 25, 2013
- Recorded: February – April 2013
- Genre: Metalcore; progressive metalcore
- Length: 48:07
- Label: Solid State
- Producer: Carson Slovak; Grant McFarland

August Burns Red chronology
Sleddin' Hill (2012)	Rescue & Restore (2013)	Found in Far Away Places (2015)

Singles from Rescue & Restore
- 1. "Spirit Breaker" Released: June 4, 2013

Rescue & Restore is the sixth studio album by American metalcore band August Burns Red. It was released on June 25, 2013, through Solid State Records and was produced by Carson Slovak and Grant McFarland. The album peaked at No. 9 on the Billboard 200 and No. 2 on the Billboard Top Christian Album chart, losing the No. 1 spot to Skillet's album Rise, which was released on the same day. It is the band's last album to be released through Solid State before they moved to Fearless Records.

It was cited as the band's best album by Bryan Rolli of Loudwire in 2025.

== Background and recording ==
Guitarist JB Brubaker stated that their new album would "...push the boundaries of our genre more than we ever have before. We set out to write a record where every song stands out from the last. There is a lot of ground covered here and a ton of meat to this album. It's full of odd metered rhythms and breakdowns, unexpected twists and turns, and some of our most technical riffing to date. Each of us have parts that make our heads spin and we have had to practice like crazy to get some of this stuff together. I know we always say this, but this will be our most ambitious album yet."

On February 12, 2013, the band announced that they would be back in the studio next week to commence recording on their new album. Carson Slovak (Century) and Grant McFarland (former This or the Apocalypse drummer) would again oversee the production of the album.

== Release and promotion ==
On May 5, they announced that the album, Rescue & Restore was set to release June 25, 2013. They released the first song off of the album called "Fault Line" on May 14 on their Facebook page. On June 4, the album became available for pre-order on iTunes. The pre-order also came with a free download of the first single "Spirit Breaker". In addition, a Japanese special edition was released; this included an extra track entitled "You Vandal" and a second disk with the band's previous release, "Sleddin' Hill."

=== Music videos ===
"Fault Line" was released as a lyric video on May 14, 2013, in advance of the release. "Provision" and "Beauty in Tragedy" both had videos released on November 12, 2013 and June 24, 2014 respectively.

== Critical reception ==
Professional ratings
Aggregate scores
Source	Rating
Metacritic	(84/100)
Review scores
Source	Rating
About.com	4/5 stars
AbsolutePunk	100%
Allmusic	4/5 stars
Alternative Press	4/5 stars
CCM Magazine	4/5 stars
Exclaim!	6/10
HM	5/5 stars
Metal Hammer	8/10
Outburn	10/10
Rock Sound	8/10

Rescue & Restore garnered critical acclaim by the 13 music critics to review the album. Todd Lyons of About.com noted it as being "demanding and rewarding", and that this is a "difficult and ultimately stellar achievement." At AbsolutePunk, Jake Denning promises that "if you consider yourself a fan of heavy music, Rescue & Restore is going to be an automatic staple in your record collection for many years to come." Gregory Heaney of Allmusic stated that the effort "is an incredible leap for the band that should not only please the August Burns Red faithful, but opens them up to a wider audience of metal lovers."

At Metal Hammer, Nik Young wrote that with respect to this album people "who think metalcore, has run its course, think again." Dan Slessor of Outburn called the release "A damn impressive feat" that at its core "flows flawlessly, each track demarcating a subtle shift in direction yet constantly builds toward a whole greater than the sum of its parts." At Rock Sound, Max Barrett noted that the album "isn't reaching into game changing territory, but ABR will retain their status as one of the genre's heavyweights." At HM, Anthony Bryant called the album an "11-track powerhouse solidifies their claim as one of the premier bands [...] not only in the genre [...] but in the whole industry as well", and noted that "from opening to closing, there is something unique about this album." Matt Conner of CCM Magazine stated that the band went beyond their form musical confinements on the release because it has everything "From fluid rhythmic changes to incredible guitar work, the band maintains the intensity through exploratory globally infused soundscapes, capped off with ever-developing theatrics."

Lee Brown of Indie Vision Music highlighted that the release contains a "tight and cohesive musical experience that isn’t afraid to innovate musically". At Jesus Freak Hideout, Wayne Reimer noted how the album "is much more than just metal with a few odd interludes sprinkled throughout." Also, Michael Weaver of Jesus Freak Hideout noted how the release "is stepped up a notch from their previous attempt." Christian Music Zine's Anthony Peronto rated the album 4.75-out-of-five, and told that "Rescue & Restore shows the band at their most inspiring and creative level yet." However, at Exclaim!, Bradley Zorgdrager said that "although the album doesn't repeat a verse-chorus-verse-chorus-breakdown formula, it also lacks distinct or memorable riffs."

== Commercial performance ==
The album debuted at No. 9 on the Billboard 200, selling 26,000 copies within the first week. The album also debuted at the No. 2 spot on Billboard Christian Albums, just behind Skillet's new album Rise, which debuted the same day. In the first five weeks of its release, the album sold 42,000 copies in the US. The album has sold 77,000 copies in the U.S. as of June 2015.

== Track listing ==
All tracks are written by August Burns Red.

No.	Title	Length
1.	"Provision"	4:40
2.	"Treatment"	5:14
3.	"Spirit Breaker"	4:51
4.	"Count It All as Lost"	4:09
5.	"Sincerity"	3:17
6.	"Creative Captivity"	4:42
7.	"Fault Line"	4:03
8.	"Beauty in Tragedy"	4:51
9.	"Animals"	3:29
10.	"Echoes"	4:23
11.	"The First Step"	4:24
Total length:		48:07

== Personnel ==
August Burns Red

- Jake Luhrs – lead vocals
- JB Brubaker – lead guitar, guzheng on "Creative Captivity"
- Brent Rambler – rhythm guitar
- Dustin Davidson – bass, backing vocals
- Matt Greiner – drums, piano

Additional musicians

- Taylor Brandt – violin on "Treatment", "Spirit Breaker", "Creative Captivity", and "Echoes"
- Grant McFarland – production, cello on all tracks except "Sincerity" and "Animals"
- Christopher Lewis – trumpet on "Creative Captivity"
- Adam Gray – additional drums on "Echoes"
- Zach Veilleux – piano on "Provision", "Treatment", and "Beauty in Tragedy"

Additional personnel

- Carson Slovak – production, mixing
- Troy Glessner – mastering
- Invisible Creature – art direction
- Ryan Clark – design, illustration

== Charts ==
Chart (2013)	Peak position
Austrian Albums (Ö3 Austria)	69
Canadian Albums (Billboard)	15
German Albums (Offizielle Top 100)	62
Swiss Albums (Schweizer Hitparade)	64
US Billboard 200	9
US Top Christian Albums (Billboard)	2
US Digital Albums (Billboard)	10
US Top Hard Rock Albums (Billboard)	2
US Independent Albums (Billboard)	1
US Top Rock Albums (Billboard)	3
US Indie Store Album Sales (Billboard)	15
