= Constellations (August Burns Red album) =

Studio album by August Burns Red
- Released: July 14, 2009
- Recorded: 2009
- Studio: Audiohammer Studios
- Genre: Melodic metalcore
- Length: 47:41
- Label: Solid State
- Producer: Jason Suecof

August Burns Red chronology
Lost Messengers: The Outtakes (2009)	Constellations (2009)	Home (2010)

Singles from Constellations
- 1. "Thirty and Seven" Released: June 29, 2009; 2. "Indonesia" Released: July 14, 2009

Constellations is the third studio album by American metalcore band August Burns Red. It was released on July 14, 2009 through Solid State Records and was produced by Jason Suecof.

Fans regard the guitar solo in "Marianas Trench" as being among the best in the metalcore genre, according to Loudwire.

== Recording and music ==
On February 24, 2009 August Burns Red announced they were working on a new album, with producer Jason Suecof at his "Audio Hammer" studio in Orlando, Florida.

The album's music has drawn comparisons to Darkest Hour, Bury Your Dead and the new wave of British heavy metal.

When asked about his drumming on the album Matt Greiner stated "There’s faster stuff than ever on Constellations and slower stuff than ever on Constellations."

The song "Indonesia", which features guest vocals from Tommy Giles Rogers of Between the Buried and Me, was made as a tribute to David Clapper, a missionary who died in a plane crash in Indonesia. He lived in Lancaster, Pennsylvania, the city in which August Burns Red began.

Some tracks from the album are featured in the rhythm game Rock Band 2, via the Rock Band Network.

== Lyrical meaning ==
On the albums message art drummer Matt Greiner stated:

Constellations is about directing our attention towards heaven, trusting that God will direct our steps, regardless of our circumstance, The kites in the artwork represent our own intelligence and innovation. So often we trust our own abilities to guide us through life, but the 'wind' of life will send our kites soaring every which way.

== Release and promotion ==
On the band's Myspace page, they released four singles from the album, "Thirty and Seven" and "Existence", with "Thirty and Seven" also available for download on the iTunes Store. "Ocean of Apathy", the third track from the then-upcoming album, was released on Monday June 29, 2009. "Meddler" was released on July 6, 2009 and was shown on the band's Myspace. On July 7, 2009, the band posted the entire album on their Myspace page. They then would sell the album days ahead of the release at the beginning of their tour with Enter Shikari, Iwrestledabearonce and Blessthefall, starting with the Recher Theatre in Towson, Maryland on July 10, 2009. On July 29, 2009 a music video was made for the song "Meddler."

In 2019, the band held an extensive tour in support of the albums 10th anniversary, starting on June 20, 2019, the tour lasted till December 7, 2019. In total the tour lasted 66 dates covering the US, New Zealand, Australia and multiple European countries.

== Commercial performance ==
The album was at No. 24 on the Billboard 200 with sales of 20,401 copies in its first week. The album also has a bonus 7-inch vinyl record, that contained an alternate version of "Indonesia" and a cover of the NOFX song, "Linoleum", as a special gift when pre-ordering through a select dealer. A second 7-inch vinyl, O Come, O Come, Emmanuel, was released on November 10, 2009 by August Burns Red's former label, CI Records. The vinyl editions were limited to 1,000 colored discs, 400 of which were green, 400 of which were red, and 200 of which were split-colored red and green.

== Critical reception ==
Professional ratings
Review scores
Source	Rating
Absolute Punk	77%
AllMusic	3.5/5 stars
Alternative Press	3.5/5 stars
Christianity Today	3.5/5 stars
Decoy	4.5/5 stars
Indie Vision Music	9/10 stars
Jesus Freak Hideout	4/5 stars
Rock Sound	8/10 stars
Ultimate Guitar	9/10

Constellations was met with positive reception, Paula Carino of AllMusic dubbed "Ocean of Apathy" a standout song on the album stating " it employs layered rhythms that bring a subtle complexity to a deceptively simple and brutal song. Although some listeners may resist the stark good-versus-evil, Jesus-conquers-Satan imagery, few metal fans would argue that, on only its third go-round, an already mature band has taken another step forward." Christianity Today wrote "Jake Luhrs is one of the fiercest frontmen in all of modern hardcore/heavy metal, but the band explores a much more melodic and instrumentally diverse side here. On top of the standard dueling riffs, the band adds intricate guitar solos and syncopated explosions that are equally at home on the Vans Warped Tour with Underoath or "Guitar Hero" right alongside Metallica all while remaining spiritually centered." Comparing it to the band’s previous record Messengers Ultimate Guitar noted "unlike Messengers, Constellations has more softer parts that make the heavier parts even brutaller. Definitely an album to throw down to."

=== Accolades ===
In 2010, Constellations was nominated for a Dove Award for Rock Album of the Year at the 41st GMA Dove Awards. In 2020 the album was voted the 10th best metalcore album of all time by readers of Ultimate Guitar.

== Track listing ==
No.	Title	Length
1.	"Thirty and Seven"	3:18
2.	"Existence"	3:53
3.	"Ocean of Apathy"	3:56
4.	"White Washed"	3:46
5.	"Marianas Trench"	4:18
6.	"The Escape Artist"	3:57
7.	"Indonesia" (featuring Tommy Giles Rogers Jr.)	3:34
8.	"Paradox"	3:18
9.	"Meridian"	5:59
10.	"Rationalist"	2:38
11.	"Meddler"	3:53
12.	"Crusades"	5:11
Total length:		47:41

Interpunk special edition Indonesia 7-inch vinyl single
No.	Title	Length
1.	"Indonesia" (alternate version without Tommy Giles Rogers Jr.)	3:31
2.	"Linoleum" (NOFX cover)	2:07

O Come, O Come, Emmanuel
No.	Title	Length
1.	"O Come, O Come, Emmanuel"	4:58
2.	"Carol of the Bells" (previously released on "X Christmas" compilation (2008) and Lost Messengers: The Outtakes EP in 2009)	2:44

Constellations: Remixed bonus track
No.	Title	Length
13.	"Ocean of Apathy" (reprise)	4:11

== Personnel ==
August Burns Red

- Jake Luhrs – lead vocals
- J.B. Brubaker – lead guitar
- Brent Rambler – rhythm guitar
- Dustin Davidson – bass, backing vocals
- Matt Greiner – drums, piano

Additional musicians

- Tommy Giles Rogers Jr. of Between the Buried and Me – guest vocals on track 7, "Indonesia"

Additional personnel

- Jason Suecof – production, mixing
- Devin Townsend – additional mixing
- Troy Glessner – mastering
- Ryan Clark of Invisible Creature – artwork
- Jonathan Dunn – A&R

== Charts ==
Chart (2009)	Peak position
Billboard 200	24
US Top Christian Albums (Billboard)	1
US Top Hard Rock (Billboard)	2
US Top Rock Albums (Billboard)	8
US Top Rock & Alternative Albums (Billboard)	8
