= Messengers (album) =

Studio album by August Burns Red
- Released: June 19, 2007
- Recorded: January 29 – March 3, 2007
- Studios: Rebel Waltz Studio, Franklin, Tennessee; Sound Kitchen, Franklin, Tennessee
- Genre: Metalcore
- Length: 48:11
- Labels: Solid State, CI
- Producers: Tue Madsen, August Burns Red

August Burns Red chronology
Thrill Seeker (2005)	Messengers (2007)	Lost Messengers: The Outtakes (2009)

Messengers is the second studio album by American metalcore band August Burns Red. It was released on June 19, 2007, through Solid State Records and was produced by the band themselves and Tue Madsen. It is their first release with vocalist Jake Luhrs and bass player Dustin Davidson. It sold 9,000 copies in its first week on sale, and went on to sell over 80,000.

== Music ==
The album's riffs are played in unison and at high tempos, with the exception of the intro riff to "Truth of a Liar", which has drawn comparisons to the guitar work of Black Sabbath guitarist Tony Iommi. Stewart Mason of AllMusic said the album's vocals are in "the contemporary death metal style." Mason also said the album has elements of 1970s heavy metal, "a less snarky version of the Eagles of Death Metal or any of the Kyuss-inspired stoner metal bands without the bongwater buzz."

Professional ratings
Review scores
Source	Rating
AbsolutePunk.net	8.5
AllMusic	3.5/5 stars
Jesus Freak Hideout	4.5/5 stars

== Background ==
A video for the song "Composure" was recorded and was released as a single on September 6, 2007. The second video from this album, for the song "Back Burner", premiered on Myspace Music on August 13, 2008. A vinyl copy of this record was also released with limited press numbers through the band's former label, CI Records.

== Track listing ==
All tracks are written by August Burns Red.

No.	Title	Length
1.	"The Truth of a Liar"	4:12
2.	"Up Against the Ropes"	5:04
3.	"Back Burner"	3:42
4.	"The Blinding Light"	5:28
5.	"Composure"	4:13
6.	"Vital Signs"	3:17
7.	"The Eleventh Hour"	4:05
8.	"The Balance"	3:20
9.	"Black Sheep"	3:53
10.	"An American Dream"	4:41
11.	"Redemption"	6:16
Total length:		48:11

Vinyl edition bonus track
No.	Title	Length
12.	"Mosely"	3:52

== Personnel ==
August Burns Red

- Jake Luhrs – lead vocals
- JB Brubaker – lead guitar
- Brent Rambler – rhythm guitar
- Dustin Davidson – bass, backing vocals
- Matt Greiner – drums, piano

Additional personnel

- Tue Madsen – production, mixing
- August Burns Red – production
- Troy Glessner – mastering
- Jon Dunn – A&R
- Invisible Creature – art direction
- Ryan Clark – design
- Jerad Knudson – cover photo
- Dave Hill – band photo
