= Math (disambiguation) =

Math or maths is an abbreviation of mathematics.

Math or Maths may also refer to:

== Arts, entertainment and media ==
=== Fictional characters ===
- Math, a character on the TV series Life Unexpected
- Math fab Mathonwy, a king in Welsh mythology
- Mathematical Anti-Telharsic Harfatum Septomin, a topic on the TV series Look Around You

=== Music ===
==== Groups ====
- MATH (band), an American band formed in the 1990s
- Math, the original name of American rock band Mutemath

==== Songs ====
- "Maths" (song), a 2012 single by Canadian producer deadmau5
- "The Math", a song on Hilary Duff's 2003 album Metamorphosis

=== Television ===
- "Math!", an episode of Blue's Clues

=== Video games ===
- Math, an alternative title for the release of Basic Math (1977)

== Computing and technology ==
- <math>...</math>, a tag used in MathML
- math, a module in the Python programming language
- Math, an alternative title for Basic Math (1977) for the Atari 2600

== Places ==
- Math, Khyber Pakhtunkhwa, a village of the Khyber Pakhtunkhwa Province of Pakistan
- Matha, Hindu monastic establishments, also known as "math" or "mutt"

== Other uses ==
- MATH, or Make America Think Harder, a slogan for Andrew Yang's 2020 presidential campaign
- Math Goossen (born 1954), Dutch politician
- Maths O. Sundqvist (1950–2012), Swedish businessman

== See also ==
- Matha (disambiguation)
- Cmath (disambiguation)
- Mathematica (disambiguation)
- Mathematics (disambiguation)
