= Fire Deuce =

American band

Fire Deuce is a band created as a side-project by Travis Stever, the lead guitarist of Coheed and Cambria. The band features members of other bands, such as Joey Eppard, Billy Riker, Chris Gartmann, and Joe Stote from the band 3, Claudio Sanchez from the band Coheed and Cambria, and Josh Eppard (rapper Weerd Science and drummer of Coheed and Cambria).

The 80's style metal group released their debut EP "Children Of The Deuce" on May 10, 2005, on CI Records. In an interview with Alternative Press in 2005, Travis Stever said that "three of the songs were fueled by Southern Comfort... and one by vodka".

A description on the official Fire Deuce website describes their style as:" elements of Coheed and Cambria's unique style alongside the hard-rock influence of bands such as AC/DC and Guns N' Roses, the raw energy of The Stooges, and the rocking punk riffage of Turbonegro, to create a brilliant, must-have record any Coheed and Cambria fan will love..." "...Fire Deuce, can easily be considered the new Spinal Tap, or, at the very least, The Darkness done right. All of these details combine to ensure that Fire Deuce stand to take their place as the masters of over-the-top, tongue-in-cheek, hard rock."

The band released the EP, Lords of Diesel, in 2020.

== Band members ==
Stage Name	Real Name	Position in Band
JE Deuce	Joey Eppard	Guitars, Bass, Vocals
Cleveland Stever	Travis Stever	Lead Vocals, Guitar, Bass
Deuce Freely	Billy Riker	Guitar, Bass
Gart Deuce	Chris Gartmann	Drums
Clyde Dirty Deuce	Claudio Sanchez	Harmonica, Vocals, Guitar
Deuce Newton	Josh Eppard	Drums
Deuce Shiskabob	Mark Schiskie	Trumpet
Dom Della Deuce	Joe Stote	Keyboards

== Discography ==
Year	Title	Label
2005	Children of the Deuce (EP)	CI Records
2007	Deep Down & Dirty (EP)	CI Records
2020	Lords of Diesel (EP)	Evil Ink Records
