= Deathless (Miss May I album) =

Studio album by Miss May I
- Released: August 7, 2015
- Studio: The Foundation Recording Studios, Connersville, Indiana
- Genre: Metalcore
- Length: 36:07
- Label: Rise
- Producer: Joey Sturgis

Miss May I chronology
Rise of the Lion (2014)	Deathless (2015)	Shadows Inside (2017)

Singles from Deathless
- 1. "I.H.E." Released: June 17, 2015; 2. "Deathless" Released: July 29, 2015

Deathless is the fifth studio album by American metalcore band Miss May I. It was released on August 7, 2015, through Rise Records. The album was produced by Joey Sturgis, who produced their first two albums (Apologies Are for the Weak and Monument), and Nick Sampson. The album was included at number 45 on Rock Sound's top 50 releases of 2015 list. This is the last album the band released on Rise Records.

Professional ratings
Review scores
Source	Rating
Exclaim!	3/10

== Track listing ==
No.	Title	Length
1.	"I.H.E."	3:47
2.	"Trust My Heart (Never Hope to Die)"	2:53
3.	"Psychotic Romantic"	3:16
4.	"Deathless"	3:51
5.	"Bastards Left Behind"	4:32
6.	"Arise"	3:24
7.	"Turn Back the Time"	3:52
8.	"Empty Promises"	4:07
9.	"The Artificial"	3:23
10.	"Born from Nothing"	3:02
Total length:		36:07

== Personnel ==
Miss May I

- Levi Benton – unclean vocals, lyrics
- Ryan Neff – bass guitar, clean vocals, lyrics
- B.J. Stead – lead guitar, backing vocals
- Justin Aufdemkampe – rhythm guitar, backing vocals
- Jerod Boyd – drums

Production

- Produced by Joey Sturgis and Nick Sampson
- Management by Craig Jennings and Andrew Snape (Raw Power Management)
- Publicity by Austin Griswold (Secret Service PR, US) and Hayley Connelly (Little Press, UK)
- Booking by Dave Shapiro (The Agency Group)

== Charts ==
Chart (2015)	Peak position
US Billboard 200	49
US Independent Albums (Billboard)	4
US Top Hard Rock Albums (Billboard)	2
US Top Rock Albums (Billboard)	5
