= Joey Eppard =

American music writer (born 1976)

- Born: September 1, 1976 (age 49)
- Origin: Kingston, New York, United States
- Genres: Rock, alternative rock, progressive rock
- Occupation: Musician
- Instruments: Vocals, guitar, bass
- Years active: 1993–present
- Label: Metal Blade Records
- Website: www.theband3.com

Joey Eppard is a music writer, recording artist, and the lead vocalist and guitarist for the experimental/progressive rock band, 3. He is also the brother of Josh Eppard, the drummer for Coheed and Cambria and former drummer of 3.

In addition to his work with 3, Joey Eppard has worked with many other musicians and bands, including Parliament-Funkadelic and Bad Brains. He also serves as a guitarist and vocalist for the psychedelic/funk band DRUGS: The Mis-Americans (in which Garry Shider and several other P-Funk members are also involved). During his career, he has performed throughout the United States and Europe, both in bands, and as a solo artist. His work also appears on the album You, My Baby & I by European artist Alex Gopher, more specifically on the track Time, which has appeared in an advertisement for Miller.

In December 2002, Joey Eppard released a solo album, Been to the Future. It includes both original acoustic songs, and solo versions of tracks that appear on other albums by 3, such as Paint by Number and Half Life. Another solo album, Joey RX, is available for international licensing, but not for sale in the United States. He has also released a song called I Can't on Purevolume, as well as three more called Word to the Wise, Shadow Play, and Dead on Myspace. Another solo album containing these songs has not yet been announced, but an alternate version of "Shadow Play" was later included in 3's fifth album, The End is Begun.

Eppard raised money via Kickstarter to fund a video shoot for a live performance at Nevessa Studios in Woodstock, NY. It was released on DVD and Blu-ray in March 2013 and features 29 songs spanning his career, both solo and with 3.

Eppard's vocals have been described as 'siren-like', while his 'finger-picked rhythms' have gained him much praise. He has stated that Led Zeppelin had a profound influence in shaping his musical talents. He also has listed such artists as King Crimson, Pink Floyd, and The Mahavishnu Orchestra as other influences. He currently endorses Ovation Guitars, ESP Guitars, Knucklehead strings and Kustom Amplification.

== 3 Discography ==
- Paint by Number (1999, Planet Noise)
- Half Life (2002, Planet Noise)
- Summercamp Nightmare (2003, Planet Noise)
- Wake Pig (2004, Planet Noise / 2005, Metal Blade)
- These Iron Bones (2007, iTunes exclusive)
- The End is Begun (2007, Metal Blade)
- Revisions (2009, Metal Blade)
- The Ghost You Gave to Me (2011, Metal Blade)

== Solo discography ==
- Been to the Future (2002, Planet Noise)
- Joey RX (unreleased)
- Joey Eppard: Live in Concert (DVD, 2013)

== Discography with Fire Deuce ==
- Children of the Deuce (2005, CI Records)

== Other projects ==
- DRUGS: The Mis-Americans
- 420 Funk Mob
- MATH
- Fire Deuce *Raised by Wolves (with fellow 3 bandmates Chris Gartdrum, and Billy Riker)
