= The End Is Begun =

Studio album by 3
- Released: July 24, 2007
- Recorded: Jersville Studios in Woodstock, NY
- Genre: New prog, progressive rock, progressive metal, hard rock
- Length: 53:32
- Label: Metal Blade Records
- Producer: 3

3 chronology
These Iron Bones (2007)	The End Is Begun (2007)	Revisions (2009)

Professional ratings
Review scores
Source	Rating
AbsolutePunk.net	(72%)
Time	3/4 stars
Sputnikmusic.com	4/5 stars

The End Is Begun, released on July 24, 2007, is 3's fourth full-length studio album, and the second to be released by Metal Blade Records. (The band's previous album, Wake Pig, was initially released on Planet Noise Records, but was later re-released on Metal Blade.) On February 19, 2008, a special edition was released with one extra track and a bonus DVD.

On May 8, 2007, the twelfth track from the album was released as part of the iTunes exclusive EP These Iron Bones. Later on, the fourth track ("All That Remains") was released for free on DownloadPunk.com. Although no other tracks from the album were officially distributed before the album's release date, bootleg recordings of live performances of several songs were leaked to the internet and/or posted with permission. As early as June 24, 2007, an unmastered promo copy was leaked onto the internet.

The seventh track, "Been to the Future," was originally released on Joey Eppard's 2002 solo album of the same name, although the new version contains added instrumentals and altered lyrics. The rest of the tracks on the album were never before included on any of the band's albums. However, a solo version of "Shadow Play" has also been available on Joey Eppard's MySpace profile since before the album's release.

== Track listing ==
All songs are written by 3 except where noted otherwise.

=== Original Version ===
1. "The Word Is Born of Flame" - 3:25
2. "The End Is Begun" - 3:42
3. "Battle Cry" - 4:03
4. "All That Remains" - 3:54
5. "My Divided Falling" - 3:51
6. "Serpents in Disguise" - 3:24
7. "Been to the Future" - 4:21
8. "Bleeding Me Home" - 3:47
9. "Live Entertainment" - 3:27
10. "Diamond in the Crush" - 3:41
11. "Shadow Play" - 4:07
12. "These Iron Bones" - 4:09
13. "The Last Day" (with Jerry Marotta) - 7:51

=== Special Edition ===
14."See Emily Play" (Pink Floyd cover)

==== Bonus DVD ====
1. "Alien Angel" video
2. "All That Remains" video
3. "Monster" (live)
4. "Bramfatura" (live)
5. "Amaze Disgrace" (live)

=== Alternative titles ===
During live performances prior to the album's release, the song "The End Is Begun" was referred to as "10-10 Wins." Also, a live version the song "My Divided Falling" was previously titled "D-Ripper" on the band's purevolume profile, but has since been removed. On the band's official website, the first track of the album was listed as "The World is Born in Flame," while the title on the album cover and insert reads "The Word is Born of Flame" but has since been fixed. Also, the solo acoustic version of "Shadow Play" that is featured on Joey Eppard's MySpace profile is spelled as one word ("shadowplay") instead of two.

== Credits ==
3

- Joey Eppard – vocals, guitar
- Billy Riker – guitar
- Daniel Grimsland – bass guitar
- Joe Stote – percussion, keyboards
- Chris "Gartdrumm" Gartmann – drums

Additional

- Jerry Marotta – Additional percussion and taos drums (track 13)
- Roman Klum – Production Engineer
- Toby Wright – Mixing
- Louie Toran – Mastering
- Daniel Grimsland – String arrangements
- Dennis Sibeijn – Artwork and design
- All music by 3
- All lyrics by Joey Eppard, except "Serpents in Disguise," by Joey Eppard and Billy Riker.
