= Texas in July =

American metalcore band

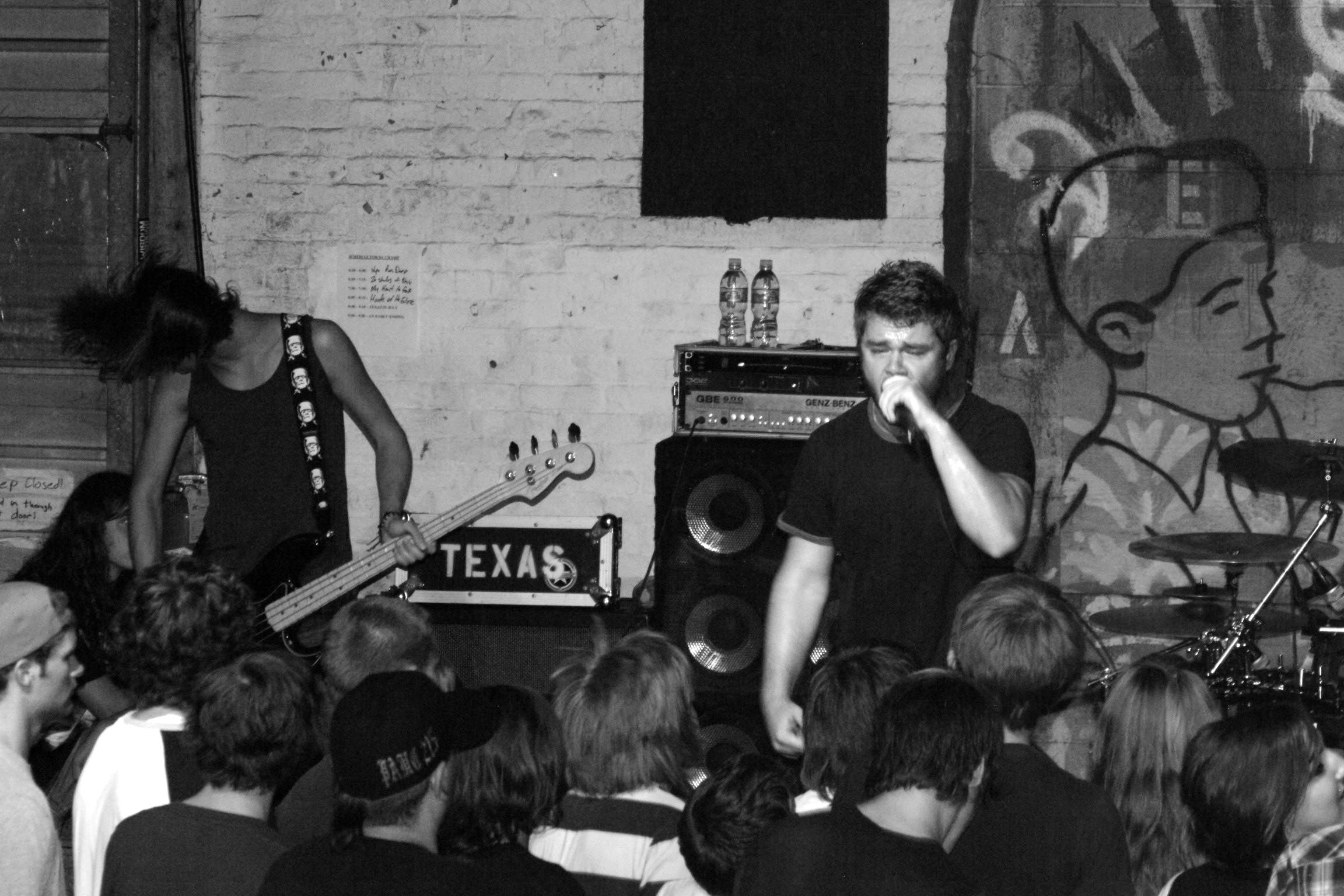
- Texas in July performing in 2009

Background information
- Origin: Ephrata, Pennsylvania, U.S.
- Genres: Metalcore; Christian metal (early)
- Years active: 2007–2015; 2021–present
- Labels: CI; Equal Vision; Nuclear Blast; Redfield
- Members: Adam Gray; Ben Witkowski; Chris Davis; J.T. Cavey; Christian Royer
- Past members: Logan Maurer; Alex Good

Texas in July is an American christian metalcore band from Ephrata, Pennsylvania, formed in 2006. They released an EP, Salt of the Earth, and their debut full-length album, I Am, also produced by Slovak, through CI Records. After signing with Equal Vision Records, they released three more studio albums: One Reality on April 26, 2011; a self-titled album on October 9, 2012; and finally Bloodwork on September 16, 2014. The band broke up at the end of 2015. After the disbanding, JT Cavey went on to join Erra and Chris Davis went on to join The Ghost Inside.

== History ==
The band in their debut music video for the song "Hook, Line and Sinner" (2009) from their EP Salt of the Earth

Texas in July was founded during 2006 in Ephrata, Pennsylvania with all of the members attending high school. The group recorded a 6 track demo within the same year they were formed and had it available for purchase at the band's local shows, most notably the Chameleon Club. The band later acquired the attention of Lancaster record label CI Records and were taken in with a contract to which they were signed to in 2008.

=== Salt of the Earth, I Am, and "Uncivilized" (2008–2010) ===
Texas in July released one EP and one full-length album through CI. Their debut EP, Salt of the Earth was released October 7, 2008 and was produced by Carson Slovak of Century. Their debut album, I Am, was released via mail order on July 2, 2009, and then was released widely on September 15, 2009. With the release of these records, the band toured with a variety of heavy metal bands, such as August Burns Red, The Devil Wears Prada, Every Time I Die and Maylene and the Sons of Disaster. With most of the members graduating, the group then set out to tour frequently and perform at several festivals, including the Purple Door Festival.

On June 15, 2010, Texas in July released a single titled "Uncivilized", with two tracks on it; "Uncivilized" and "Fight Fair". "Uncivilized" being a brand new track recorded in the Spring of 2010, and "Fight Fair", a track previously unreleased that was recorded during the recording for I Am, but was not released on the album. "Fight Fair" was also the last track on their original demo CD and the only song from their demo to ever be re-recorded. In 2010 "Uncivilized" along with "Elements" and "Hook, Line and Sinner" have been made available as downloadable content for the Rock Band video games via the Rock Band Network. On July 8, 2010, the group announced that they were taken in with a signing to Equal Vision Records and are now signed to the label, as opposed to CI.

=== Departure of Maurer and tour activity (2010–2011) ===
On August 24, 2010, guitarist Logan Maurer played his last show as a part of Texas in July. The performance was held at the Chameleon Club in Lancaster, Pennsylvania, the band's hometown. The reason behind Maurer's departure from the band was that he wasn't comfortable spending his life touring rather than choosing to pursue a further education upon enrolling in college. Chris Davis would replace Maurer shortly thereafter.

Between September 3 and October 16, 2010, the band was a part of the This or the Apocalypse tour. Between December 26, 2010 and February 11, 2011 the group was also a part of A Metal Christmas Tour. Texas in July embarked on the Motel 6 "Rock Yourself to Sleep" Tour (January and February 2011) with headliner We Came as Romans and other support from Woe, Is Me, For Today, and The Word Alive which included the Outerloop Presents Amped and Alive "Ice Jam" festival on January 30, 2011 at Sonar, in Baltimore, Maryland with Silverstein co-headlining the event with We Came as Romans.

=== One Reality (2011–2012) ===
One Reality was released on April 26, 2011 under Equal Vision Records with metal producer Chris "Zeuss" Harris. It was the band's first album to chart; debuting at #173 on the Billboard 200, and selling roughly 3,300 units in its first week of sales.

From April 22 to May 28, 2011, Texas in July was an opening band for the Take Action Tour, a benefit tour for the sex education site, sexetc.org. Texas in July provided support to We Came as Romans on the United States and Canada Merchnow.com + Arkaik Clothing "I'm Alive" Tour (September - October 2011) with other support from Miss May I, Of Mice & Men, and Close to Home;

In August of 2011, the band announced it had signed a record deal with Nuclear Blast to distribute its music in European countries.

On April 20, 2012 were announced as, and took part in the Scream It Like You Mean It 2012 tour (July - August 2012).

=== Self-titled album (2012–2013) ===
The band uploaded a video to their Facebook profile on July 8, 2012 stating that they're finished recording and the new album will be released later this year. Their self-titled album was released on October 9, 2012, with a single, "Bed of Nails", being released on September 11, 2012. David Stephens of We Came as Romans appeared as a vocalist on the track "C4." Texas in July supported Falling In Reverse at the Snickers presents Six Flags FestEvil FrightFest New Jersey on September 29, 2012 with Norma Jean, We Came as Romans, Born of Osiris, I, the Breather, My Ticket Home, Palisades, Visions, Horizons, I Am King, First of the Fallen, and Dream for Tomorrow. To close out 2012, Texas in July provided support to For Today on "The Unshakeable Tour" (October - November 2012) with other support from Impending Doom; and announced their first tour of 2013 on November 19, 2012 providing support on Of Mice & Men's North American tour (January - March 2013) presented by Tilly's, with additional support from Woe, Is Me, Volumes, and Capture The Crown.

The band's single, "Bed of Nails" was featured as part of Equal Vision Records' "New Sounds 2013, Vol. 2 - EP" compilation via iTunes on April 9, 2013. The band played the LAUNCH Music Conference at the Chameleon Club in Lancaster, PA on April 25, 2013; and provided direct support to Structures on their Canadian headliner (May 2013). The band played eight solo shows on their trek home following the Canadian tour (May – June 2013); and supported Impending Doom at the Pennsylvania Deathbed Festival in Allentown, PA on June 29, 2013.

In March 2013, the band entered the studio to record; and on June 18 it was revealed that they will be releasing a deluxe edition of their self-titled album on July 16, containing 3 new songs. The band headlined a "Northeast Mini-Tour" (July 5–11, 2013) with support of local acts; and will also be playing the final leg of the Van's Warped Tour 2013 (July–August 2013). Dave Stephens of We Came as Romans provided guest vocals for during the song "C4" starting July 26, 2013 in Tampa, FL and announced that he would be for the remainder of Van's Warped Tour 2013. Following Van's Warped Tour 2013, the band provided direct support to headliner Architects at the "Destruction Derby Open Air Festival" (August 23–24, 2013) in Wasserburg Rosslau, Dessau-Rosslau, Germany to start off their "Europe 2013" tour (August - September 2013). One of three new tracks on the deluxe version of their self-titled album, "Time-Lapse" was featured on the Equal Vision Records 2013 Summer Sampler, released via iTunes on July 2, 2013. On July 23, 2013, CI Records released a Reflections, 14-song compilation album in the iTunes Store.

Vocalist J.T. Cavey and guitarist Kyle Ahern filled in these respective positions for Alex Good and Christian Royer during Van's Warped Tour 2013.

Another vocalist, Alex Mola, filled in for all 2013 European dates. Texas in July headlined a follow-on show to Van's Warped Tour 2013 on August 6, 2013 in Birmingham, Alabama with support from Of Empires, Strength from Within, Echoes of Creation, and OMAAF; and provided support to The Devil Wears Prada on their headlining tour (November - December 2013) with additional support from The Ghost Inside and Volumes. J.T. Cavey provided lead vocals on this tour; and on November 11, 2013, this tour package and Sleeping With Sirens' headliner met up in St. Paul, Minnesota at Myth Live for a festival show featuring additional support from Breathe Carolina, Issues, Volumes, and Our Last Night.

=== Bloodwork and final European tour (2014–2015) ===
On February 13, 2014, the band posted a video on YouTube titled "New Beginnings", which was narrated by the band announcing officially that vocalist Alex Good and guitarist Christian Royer had decided to leave the band; Good's reason being to spend time with his family. Fill-in vocalist J.T. Cavey was announced to be Good's replacement in the video. On June 16, the band released a new song, "Broken Soul"; the first studio recording to feature Cavey on vocals. On July 22, 2014, the band announced their new album titled Bloodwork. The album was subsequently released on September 16, 2014. On April 17, 2015, the band announced their plans to break up by the end of 2015. A final headline tour of Europe shortly followed. The band finished their final North American tour in the December 2015 with Invent, Animate, Reflections, and To the Wind as support. After the band's break-up, J.T. Cavey would move on to join progressive metalcore band Erra, and guitarist Chris Davis would join The Ghost Inside.

=== Reunion and Without Reason EP (2021–present) ===
Texas in July returned to the stage on December 29, 2021 at Freedom Hall in Lancaster, PA, supporting August Burns Red's annual "Christmas Burns Red" tour. Nine years after their most recent release Bloodwork in 2014, the band released a single titled "False Divinity" on June 23, 2023. On October 19th, 2023, the band released another single titled "Put to Death" and announced an EP "Without Reason," released on November 17th.

== Band members ==
Current

- Adam Gray – drums (2007–2015, 2021–present)
- Ben Witkowski – bass guitar (2007–2015, 2021–present)
- Chris Davis – rhythm guitar (2011–2015, 2021–present); lead guitar (2014–2015) (currently in The Ghost Inside)
- J.T. Cavey – vocals (2014–2015, 2021–present) (currently in ERRA)
- Christian Royer – lead guitar (2007–2014, 2021–present)

Former

- Logan Maurer – rhythm guitar (2007–2010)
- Alex Good – vocals (2007–2013)

Touring

- Kyle Ahern – lead guitar (2013 and 2015)

Timeline

== Discography ==
Studio albums

Year	Title	Label	Chart positions		
Year	Title	Label	Top 200	US Indie	US Heat
2009	I Am	CI	—	—	—
2011	One Reality	Equal Vision	174	31	3
2012	Texas in July	Equal Vision	152	—	4
2014	Bloodwork	Equal Vision	71	—	—

EPs

- Salt of the Earth (2008, CI)
- Without Reason (2023, Equal Vision)

Compilations

- Reflections (2013, CI)

Singles

- "Hook, Line and Sinner" (2009)
- "Uncivilized" (2011)
- "1000 Lies" (2011)
- "Bed of Nails" (2012)
- "Broken Soul" (2014)
- "False Divinity" (2023)
- "Put to Death" (2023)
