= Carousel Kings =

American pop punk band

Carousel Kings is an American pop punk band from Lancaster, Pennsylvania, United States, formed in late 2008 by founding member David Alexander. They started their career on CI Records and are currently signed to Victory Records. Their Victory Records debut album, Charm City, was released on February 10, 2017, entering the iTunes rock charts at number 14.

== History ==
Carousel Kings began in late 2008/early 2009 with the release of their EP Here Comes Trouble. They made the release free to the public to try and gain as much attention as possible. The band self-released their first unsigned full-length album titled Speak Frantic in 2010 and toured unsigned DIY with other bands such as Major League and So Many Ways. They opened for numerous national acts locally in their hometown of Lancaster such as Sky Eats Airplane, Alesana, and The Bled gaining the attention of long time manager /owner of CI Records Jeremy Weiss. In March 2012 the band removed Speak Frantic from online outlets, and recorded and added more songs to create and release their first Indie Label album titled A Slice Of Heaven on CI Records out of their hometown in Lancaster. They then toured relentlessly with bands like Major League, Darling Parade, Better Off, City Lights, We Were Sharks, Rust Belt Lights, Auburn, One Year Later. In November 2012 the band released an EP titled Road Warrior along with a music video for the song. Two years later the band released their third album titled Unity . They toured the United States and Japan/China as well as appeared on the 2012 and 2015 Vans Warped Tour while being signed to CI Records. Carousel Kings signed to Victory Records and released their third full-length album, Charm City. The album art was done by artist from India Archan Nair. CK did another round of Warped in 2017 as well as Japan, and multiple US and CAN dates with bands such as Our Last Night, A Loss For Words, My Ticket Hone, Knockout Kid, Count To Four, We Were Sharks, Abandoned By Bears, Badcase, Survay Says, Keep Flying, Picture Perfect, The Pink Spiders, GutterLIFE, Post Season, Old Again, Altars, The Vegas Wakeup, Freshman 15, Everybody Run, Lions Lions, For the Win.

== Band members ==
- David Alexander (vocals)
- Will Barovick (guitar, vocals)
- Danny Wilkins (drums)
- Cody Williams (bass, vocals)
- Kyle Fisher (guitar)

== Past members ==
- Andrew Zell (Bass/Guitar)
- Luke Harvey (Guitar/Vocals)
- Jarrod Galler (Drums)
- Max Fastnacht (Drums/Guitar)
- Jarrod Shirley (Guitar)
- Kyle Cater (Guitar)
- Wes Good (Guitar)
- Brad Herr (Guitar)
- Kyle Salaga (Bass)
- Carmen Carangi (Guitar/Vocals)
- Matthew Bozievich (Bass)
- Clinton Tustin (Touring Guitar)

== Discography ==
Title	Album details
Here Comes Trouble - EP	Released: 2009; Track listing: 1. "Intro"; 2. "That's What She Said"; 3. "Two Ghosts Are Better Than One"; 4. "Max's Song"
Speak Frantic	Released: 2010; Track listing: 1. "Can You Go a Little Faster?"; 2. "League of Small Heroes"; 3. That's What She Said"; 4. "Try Not to Break Us Down"; 5. "Reach for the Sky"; 6. "Two Ghosts Are Better Than One"; 7. "Max's Song"; 8. "Baby"; 9. "Vacations"; 10. "Worth My Time"
A Slice of Heaven	Released: March 13, 2012; Length: 37:44; Labels: CI Records; Track listing: 1. "Rumspringa"; 2. "That's What She Said"; 3. "Baby"; 4. "Don't Go Home"; 5. "Take This Rope"; 6. "Spark the Spark"; 7. "Moonlight"; 8. "League of Small Heroes"; 9. "Hands on Deck"; 10. "Try Not to Break Us Down"; 11. "Two Ghosts Are Better Than One"; 12. "Max's Song"
Road Warrior - EP	Released: November 20, 2012; Length: 10:10; Labels: CI Records; Track listing: 1. "Road Warrior"; 2. "Jersey Yodel"; 3. "Max's Song - Acoustic"
Unity	Released: April 15, 2014 (standard), July 10, 2015 (deluxe, titled Polarity); Length: 34:00 (standard), 56:14 (deluxe); Labels: CI Records; Track listing: 1. "Headphones"; 2. "Stuck"; 3. "Cycles"; 4. "Free"; 5. "Change"; 6. "Mistakes"; 7. "Chainsaw"; 8. "Silence"; 9. "Zombie" - featuring Alex Good; 10. "Cancer"; 11. "Light"; 12. "Hope"; 13. " Up up and Away" - Kid Cudi Cover (deluxe); 14. "Try Not to Break Us Down" - 2010 Demo (deluxe); 15. "Reach for the Sky" - 2010 Demo (deluxe); 16. "Vacations" - 2010 Demo (deluxe)
Duality	Released: July 10, 2015; Length: 24:12; Labels: CI Records; Track listing: 1. "Headphones" - Acoustic; 2. "Stuck" - Acoustic; 3. "Cycles" - Acoustic; 4. "Free" - Acoustic; 5. "Change" - Acoustic; 6. "Silence" - Acoustic; 7. "Cancer" - Acoustic; 8. "Hope" - Acoustic
Three Christmas Classics...A Four Song EP (with The Great Heights Band)	Released: November 27, 2015; Length: 9:59; Labels: CI Records; Track listing: 1. "We Three Kings" - Carousel City; 2. "Twisted Christmas" - The Great Heights Band; 3. "Silent Night" - Carousel City; 4. "White Christmas" - The Great Heights Band
Charm City	Released: February 10, 2017; Length: 44:55; Labels: Victory Records; Track listing: 1. "Grey Goose"; 2. "Glory Daze"; 3. "Here, Now, Forever"; 4. "Bad Habit"; 5. "Something Isn't Right"; 6. "Hate Me, Love Me"; 7. "Charm City"; 8. "Dynamite"; 9. "Unconditionally"; 10. "Fractals"; 11. "Punch Drunk"; 12. "Fool's Gold"; 13. "You Never Will"
Plus Ultra	Released: May 31, 2019; Length: 38:55; Labels: Victory Records; Track listing: 1. "Plus Ultra"; 2. "Move Slow"; 3. "Shellshocked"; 4. "Code Breaker (Smile)"; 5. "Ghost"; 6. "Lock Meowt"; 7. "Great White Buffalo"; 8. "Truth Seekers"; 9. "Shelter"; 10. "Monarch"; 11. "Jamais Vu"
Untitled Mixtape	Released: February 17, 2023; Length: 34:17; Labels: Mother West; Track listing: 1. "Empty Clouds"; 2. "Memory Kitty Chord - ft. A.J. Perdomo"; 3. "Disappear - ft. Sunday Friend"; 4. "Something In The Water - ft. Paycheck"; 5. "Eternally Sent - ft. Saxl Rose"; 6. "Not Settling Yet - ft. A.J. Perdomo"; 7. "Tragic - ft. Rory Rodriguez"; 8. "Pleasure Weather - ft. Saxl Rose"; 9. "Forgive And Regret ft. sadgods" 10. "Heart Strings"
