= Meth (disambiguation) =

Meth is an informal name for methamphetamine, a central nervous system stimulant that is mainly used as a recreational drug.

Meth, meths or methamphetamine may also refer to:

== Chemicals and substances ==
- Meth-, a prefix for the methyl (-CH_{3}) functional group in organic chemistry
- Methadone, a synthetic opioid
- Methanol, a simple alcohol with formula CH_{3}OH
- Methylated spirit, ethanol that has additives to make it more poisonous or unpalatable

== People ==
- Meth, the stage name of Michalis Kouinelis (born 1979), Greek singer
- Keegan Meth (born 1988), Zimbabwean cricketer
- Method Man (born 1971), American hip-hop artist

== Arts and entertainment ==
- Meth (album), 2011 album by rapper Z-Ro
- Meth (film), a 2006 documentary on drug abuse among gay men
- "Methamphetamine", a 1996 song by Eyehategod from Dopesick (album)
- "Methamphetamine", a 2008 song by Old Crow Medicine Show from Tennessee Pusher
- "Methamphetamine", a 2007 song by Son Volt from The Search (Son Volt album)

== See also ==
- Math (disambiguation)
