= Blood Work =

Blood Work may refer to:

- A medical process also known as a blood test
- Blood Work (novel) (1998), a novel by Michael Connelly
  - Blood Work (film) (2002), a film based on the book, starring Clint Eastwood
- Bloodwork (film), 2012
- Bloodwork (EP), released by horror punk musician Wednesday 13 in 2008
- Bloodwork (album), released by metalcore band Texas in July in 2014
- "Bloodwork" (song), a single from the 2004 album A Snow Capped Romance by Alaskan metalcore band 36 Crazyfists
- Bloodwork Records, a record label owned by American punk rock drummer Dr. Chud
- Ramsey Rosso, a fictional character from DC Comics, also known as Bloodwork
