= Summercamp Nightmare =

Studio album by 3
- Released: October 7, 2003
- Recorded: IIWII studios in Weehawken, NJ; The Temple of Stote
- Genre: Alternative rock
- Length: 60:36
- Label: Planet Noise
- Producer: Robert "Chicken" Burke, Joey Eppard

3 chronology
Half Life (2002)	Summercamp Nightmare (2003)	Wake Pig (2004)

Summercamp Nightmare is the second studio album by the band 3 released in 2003.

== Overview ==
The band decided they wanted to record the entire record without the use of computers or digital recording technology, so it was recorded entirely to analog tape. Some of the tracks that appear on this album had previously been included on the band's live album Half Life, while "Dregs" and "Amaze Disgrace" were later featured again on next band's album Wake Pig, most notably "Amaze Disgrace", which has appeared on three of the band's albums as well as Joey Eppard's first solo album Been to the Future.

== Track listing ==
All tracks are written by 3.

No.	Title	Length
1.	"Endless Alibi"	5:39
2.	"Halloween"	3:00
3.	"Dregs"	3:23
4.	"Broadway Alien"	5:28
5.	"Signs of Life"	4:13
6.	"Dive"	3:59
7.	"Fable"	5:13
8.	"Pretty Girls"	2:45
9.	"Bedroom in Hell"	5:43
10.	"Amaze Disgrace"	7:07
11.	"Soul Reality"	4:10
12.	"The Latest from Mars" (contains a backwards version of "Broadway Alien" as a hidden track)	9:50
Total length:		60:36

== Personnel ==
3

- Joey Eppard – vocals, guitar
- Billy Riker – guitar
- Joe Cuchelo – bass
- Joe Stote – keyboards, percussion
- Chris "Gartdrumm" Gartmann – drums

Additional

- Executive producer — Tom Benton
- Cover art by Joey Eppard
- Back insert photo by Allison Braun
- Insert photos by Molly Rubin
- Graphics by The Turning Mill
- Mastered at The Clubhouse, Rhinebeck, New York by Paul Antonell and Sean Price
- "Dregs" and "Amaze Disgrace" recorded at The Temple of Stote, produced by Joey Eppard, engineered and mixed by Robert Frazza
- All other songs recorded at IIWII studios in Weehawken, NJ, produced by Robert "Chicken" Burke, engineered by Sal Mormando, and mixed by Sal Mormando, Joey Eppard, and Robert "Chicken" Burke
