= Curse of Existence =

Studio album by Miss May I
- Released: September 2, 2022
- Genre: Metalcore
- Length: 37:25
- Label: SharpTone
- Producer: Will Putney

Miss May I chronology
| Shadows Inside (2017) | Curse of Existence (2022) | No Place for Me (2026) |

Singles from Curse of Existence
- 1. "Unconquered" Released: March 9, 2022; 2. "Bleed Together" Released: May 25, 2022; 3. "Earth Shaker" Released: June 29, 2022; 4. "Free Fall" Released: August 10, 2022

Curse of Existence is the seventh studio album by American metalcore band Miss May I. It was released on September 2, 2022, through SharpTone Records. It is the last album by the band to feature guitarists B.J. Stead and Justin Aufdemkampe, who both left the band on May 31, 2024. It was produced by Will Putney.

== Background and recording ==
On October 6, 2020, Miss May I announced that they are working on new material for the forthcoming album. March 30, 2021, the band have concluded the recording sessions for their new album. On May 24, 2022, they revealed the album itself, the album cover, the track list, and release date.

== Critical reception ==
Professional ratings
Review scores
| Source | Rating |
|---|---|
| Distorted Sound | 8/10 |
| Rock 'N' Load | 9/10 |
| Wall of Sound | 8/10 |

The album received positive reviews from critics. Katie Bird of Distorted Sound scored the album 8 out of 10 and said: "Despite falling into the trappings of a slightly cliché ending, Miss May I have proved that the wait is worth it. They have improved upon their sound by delightfully mixing deathcore, melodic and clean vocals to make a unique take on the metalcore sound. This band have shown that they always have a new trick up their sleeve, and can still surprise fans to this day. This album was five years in the making, and it shows that Miss May I can still be unique in a genre that sometimes grows stale. Curse of Existence is one of the most interesting metalcore albums this year, and whilst it won't please everyone, it will be a great album for both newcomers and fans of the band."

Rock 'N' Load praised the album saying, "Curse of Existence is ten songs full of emotion and intensity, a solid offering from Miss May I. This is their second album released on Sharptone Records and they've outdone themselves with this one; completely worth the wait." Wall of Sound gave the album a score 8/10 and saying: "So have Miss May I returned to Monument form with Curse of Existence? I think it is as close as they have been. The boys have got a bit more aggressive overall, the guitar riffage is a bit more furious, the chorus' are huge, and there is no shortage of gigantic breakdowns. The band certainly ain't breaking any new barriers but I think they've taken everything they've learnt over the years and put it together to create one hell of a modern metalcore album. I'll be spinning this one for a while!"

== Track listing ==
Adapted from Apple Music.

| No. | Title | Length |
|---|---|---|
| 1. | "A Smile That Does Not Exist" | 3:32 |
| 2. | "Earth Shaker" | 3:23 |
| 3. | "Bleed Together" | 4:30 |
| 4. | "Into Oblivion" | 4:15 |
| 5. | "Hollow Vessel" | 4:10 |
| 6. | "Free Fall" | 3:18 |
| 7. | "Born Destroyers" | 3:56 |
| 8. | "Unconquered" | 3:35 |
| 9. | "Savior of Self" | 3:10 |
| 10. | "Bloodshed" | 3:32 |
| Total length: | | 37:25 |

== Personnel ==
Credits are adapted from the album's liner notes.

=== Miss May I ===
- Levi Benton – unclean vocals
- Ryan Neff – clean vocals, bass
- Justin Aufdemkampe – guitar, additional production
- B. J. Stead – guitar
- Jerod Boyd – drums

=== Additional contributors ===
- Will Putney – production, engineering, mixing, mastering
- Nick Sampson – additional production, engineering assistance
- Ben Johnson – production assistance
- Steve Seid – additional engineering
- Jim Hughes – artwork, layout
