= MATH (band) =

American experimental band

- Origin: Woodstock, New York, United States
- Genres: Musical improvisation; experimental rock
- Years active: 1996 – present
- Labels: unsigned
- Members: Billy Riker; Joey Eppard; Michael Schirmer; Dave Bodie; Max Oleson; Dave Parker
- Past members: Eddie Cercone

MATH is an American Improv/experimental band formed in Woodstock, New York in the mid-1990s. The band's shifting personnel has included members of various other bands, most notably Billy Riker and Joey Eppard of 3 and Dave Bodie of Time of Orchids and Kayo Dot.

== History ==
MATH was born in 1996 when Billy Riker, Joey Eppard and Eddie Cercone got together to jam in Gram's Basement. Early on they used the name "The Ed Hot Billy Eppards" but eventually settled on MATH. The first rehearsal was recorded live to cassette via boombox and was all improvisation with no preconceived ideas whatsoever.

Over the next few rehearsals some songs were worked out whenever they found a moment to stop jamming. Their first show was at Graduation Party in uptown Kingston on the lawn in the backyard, a beautiful summer day. The local ice cream man, "Mr. Ding-a-ling," even stopped by. They performed all of the structured songs with the exception of one improv piece added in.

Throughout 1996–97 MATH performed at various outdoor summer parties and even a meditational gathering. For these shows it was half improv, half songs and eventually becoming almost exclusively improv. The band took a break for the next few years occasionally getting together and jamming.

In early 2000 shortly after Riker joined 3, MATH got together for a magical reunion in the studio and recorded material that was done live and all improv, this time incorporating Eppard's vocal skills and additional backing vocals from the band. This was followed up one month later in May 2000 with an all improv live show in Woodstock which was also recorded.

In June 2007 MATH reformed with new members Dave Bodie (of Time of Orchids) on drums, Michael Schirmer on Keyboards and Max Oleson (of PEACEBOMB) on Vocals. They got together at Darkworld Studio in Kingston, NY on June 10 and 11 and recorded several hours of raw improvisational material. 14 of those jams have become InsertYourNameHere. A week and a half later they performed a mostly improvisational live show at The Colony Cafe in Woodstock, where they unveiled InsertYourNameHere.

== Discography ==
=== Studio albums ===
- InsertYourNameHere is a 2007 improvised album, recorded on June 10 and 11, 2007 at Darkworld Studio in Kingston, NY, represents the first occasion Billy Riker, Joey Eppard, Max Oleson, Michael Schirmer and Dave Bodie performed together as MATH. The album was self-produced and is out of print.

=== Live albums ===
- The Puppydog Tape (1996)
- Live at the Turning Mill (2000)
