= CI Records =

American independent record label

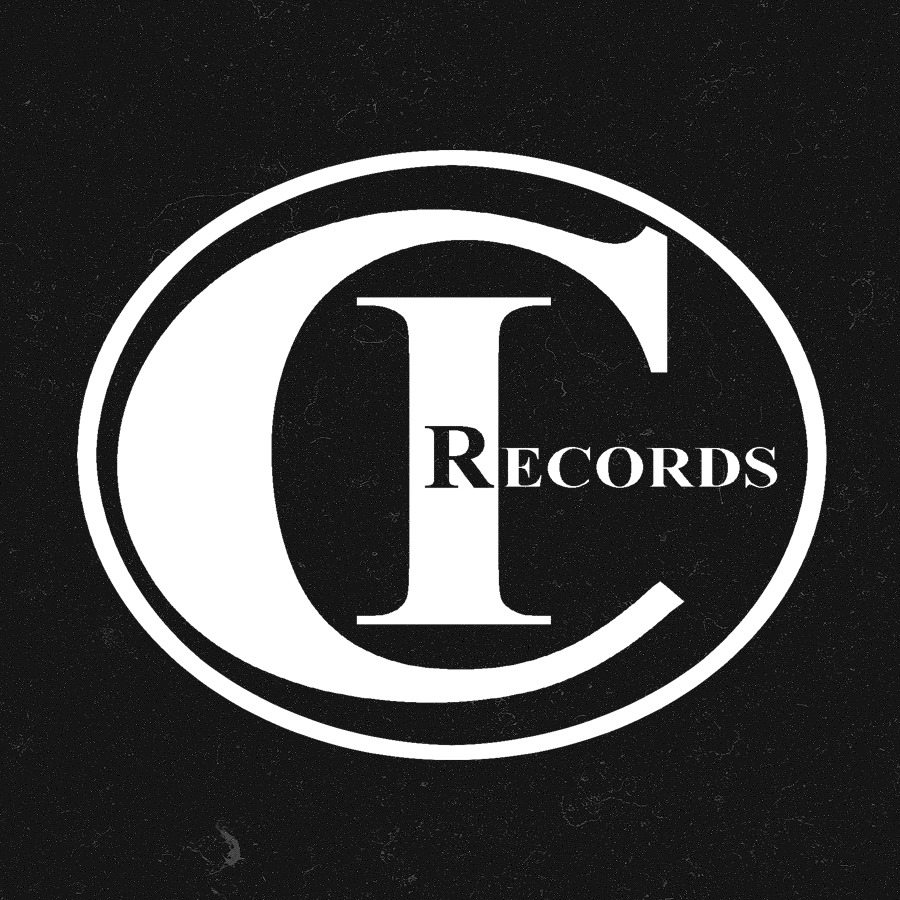
- Founded: 1987
- Founder: Jeremy Weiss
- Distributors: MVD Entertainment Group, The Orchard
- Genre: Hard rock, indie rock, heavy metal, alternative rock, emo, punk rock, hip hop
- Country of origin: U.S.
- Location: Lancaster, Pennsylvania
- Official website: cirecords.com

CI Records is an independent record label in Lancaster, Pennsylvania, owned by Jeremy Weiss. Originally created to distribute the releases of his band, Stand Up, an early 1990s melodic hardcore band. Weiss also operates the physical record store, CI Records & Skates in Downtown Lancaster.

Albums by Jeff Caudill, Sense Field, The Juliana Theory and Jonah Matranga's (of Far, New End Original, Gratitude, and Onelinedrawing) followed after the initial success. Notable artists to sign with CI have included August Burns Red, Texas In July, The Pink Spiders, Carousel Kings, Sadaharu, Fire Deuce (The side project of Coheed and Cambria's Travis Stever), and Movies with Heroes. CI Records is also the homebase of the LAUNCH Music Conference & Festival, held annually in Lancaster and now entering its 16th year.

The label owes its name to a punk rock band once played in founder Jeremy Weiss, called Corrupted Image, from which the initials were used.

== Current roster ==
- Gladiators
- Dre Powe
- Lexxe
- The Maguas
- Poeta
- The Road to Milestone

== Past roster ==
- Albert React
- An Early Ending
- A Scent Like Wolves
- August Burns Red (Active, on SharpTone Records)
- Carousel Kings (Active, on Victory Records)
- Centerfolds
- Circus Circus
- Fire Deuce
- Jeff Caudill
- Hoping for the Better
- Home Sweet Home
- Hometruths
- The Juliana Theory (disbanded, one member playing solo)
- Movies with Heroes
- Muddfoot
- Once Nothing (Active, unsigned)
- Onelinedrawing
- One Year Later
- The Pavers
- The Pink Spiders
- Que Sera
- Running from Dharma
- Sadaharu
- Sense Field
- Serpico
- Stand Up
- Submachine
- Three Steps Up
- Texas In July
- Time Has Come
- Vision
- Cancerous Reagans
- Violent Society
- The Memory
- Where the Ocean Meets the Sky
- The Woodsmans Babe

== See also ==
- List of record labels
