= Shadows Inside =

Studio album by Miss May I
- Released: June 2, 2017
- Genre: Metalcore
- Length: 34:25
- Label: SharpTone
- Producer: Drew Fulk; Nick Sampson

Miss May I chronology
Deathless (2015)	Shadows Inside (2017)	Curse of Existence (2022)

Singles from Shadows Inside
- 1. "Lost in the Grey" Released: April 14, 2017; 2. "Shadows Inside" Released: May 12, 2017; 3. "Swallow Your Teeth" Released: May 19, 2017

Shadows Inside is the sixth studio album by American metalcore band Miss May I. Released on June 2, 2017, this was the band's first release on SharpTone Records after leaving Rise Records.

The music video for "Lost in the Grey" was directed by Ramon Boutviseth.

== Track listing ==
All tracks are written by Levi Benton, Jerod Boyd, Justin Aufdemkampe, Robert Stead Jr., Drew Fulk and Josh Strock.

No.	Title	Length
1.	"Shadows Inside"	3:56
2.	"Under Fire"	3:17
3.	"Never Let Me Stay"	3:20
4.	"My Destruction"	2:56
5.	"Casualties"	3:21
6.	"Crawl"	3:27
7.	"Swallow Your Teeth"	4:00
8.	"Death Knows My Name"	2:59
9.	"Lost in the Grey"	3:30
10.	"My Sorrow"	3:40
Total length:		34:25

== Personnel ==
Miss May I

- Levi Benton – unclean vocals, lyrics
- Ryan Neff – bass guitar, clean vocals, lyrics, lead vocals tracks 3 & 6
- B.J. Stead – lead guitar, backing vocals
- Justin Aufdemkampe – rhythm guitar, backing vocals
- Jerod Boyd – drums

Additional personnel

- Drew Fulk – production, engineering
- Nick Sampson – production, engineering
- Alan Douches – mastering
- Andrew Wade – mixing
- Max Klein – engineering
- Marco Mazzoni – illustrations

== Charts ==
Chart (2017)	Peak position
US Billboard 200	176
US Top Rock Albums (Billboard)	37
US Top Hard Rock Albums (Billboard)	6
US Top Independent Albums (Billboard)	6
