= Miss May I =

American metalcore band

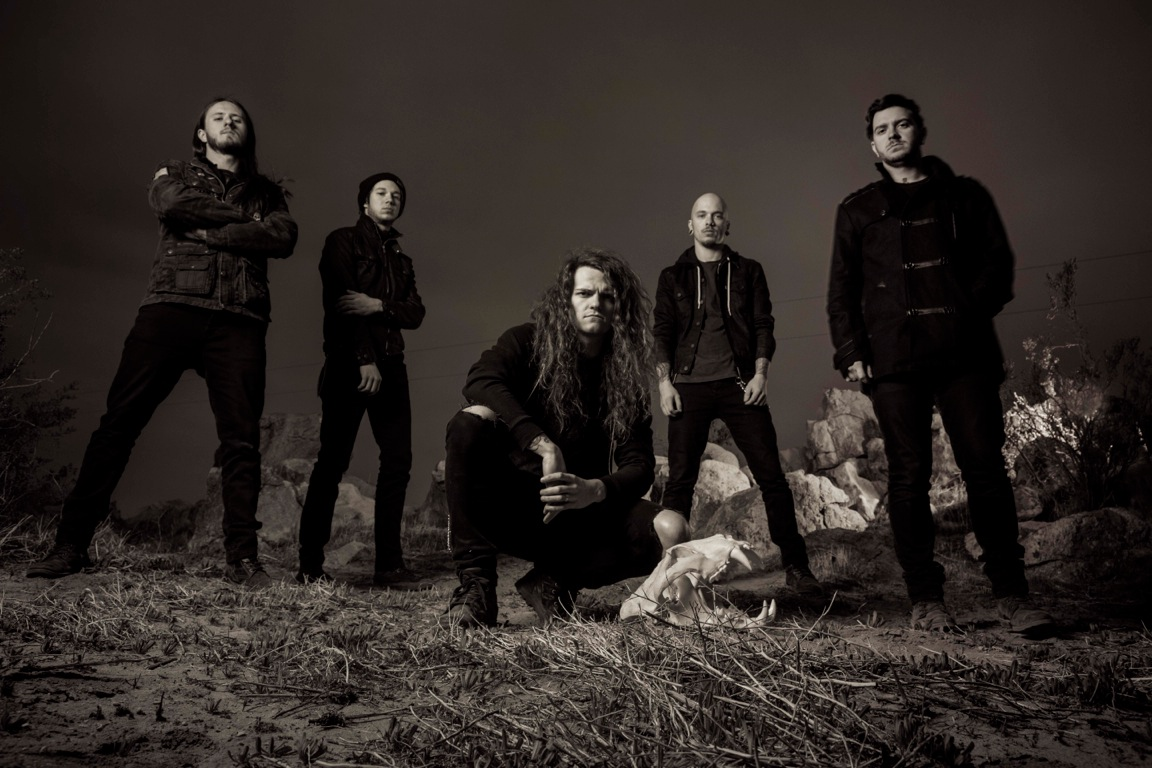
- Miss May I in 2014. From left to right: BJ Stead, Justin Aufdemkampe, Levi Benton, Ryan Neff and Jerod Boyd

Background information
- Also known as: Saving Small Town; Day of the Locusts
- Origin: Troy, Ohio, U.S.
- Genre: Melodic metalcore
- Years active: 2007–present
- Labels: Rise; SharpTone; Solid State
- Members: Levi Benton; Jerod Boyd; Ryan Neff; Elisha Mullins
- Past members: Justin Aufdemkampe; B. J. Stead; Josh Gillespie
- Website: missmayi.com

Miss May I is an American metalcore band from Troy, Ohio. Formed in 2007, they signed to Rise Records in 2008 and released their debut album, Apologies Are for the Weak through the label while the members were still attending high school. The album reached 76 on the Billboard 200, No. 29 on Billboard's Top Heatseekers, and No. 66 on Top Independent Albums. The band has also had some of their material featured in big name productions; the song "Forgive and Forget" is featured on the Saw VI Original Motion Picture Soundtrack, and their song "Apologies Are for the Weak" is included in the video game Saints Row: The Third.

The band had retained the same lineup since its formation until 2024 when guitarists B. J. Stead and Justin Aufdemkampe left the band, with the only exception being bassist Ryan Neff, who left the band in 2007 and rejoined in 2009. Miss May I released their second studio album, Monument, on August 16, 2010; their third album, At Heart, on June 12, 2012; their fourth, Rise of the Lion, on April 29, 2014; their fifth, Deathless, on August 7, 2015. On June 24, 2016, the band left Rise Records and signed with SharpTone Records. On June 2, 2017, they released their sixth studio album, Shadows Inside, their first under their new label. On September 2, 2022, Miss May I released Curse of Existence.

== History ==
=== Formation and early releases (2007–2013) ===
Miss May I was formed in 2007, in Troy, Ohio with the original members being Levi Benton, Justin Aufdemkampe, BJ Stead, Jerod Boyd, and Ryan Neff. Neff left in late 2007 to join Cincinnati band, Rose Funeral and was then replaced by Josh Gillespie.

In late 2007, the band released a five-track EP titled Vows for a Massacre followed by their 2008 demo the next year, both of which were self-released. This demo contained 6 tracks, including "Architect" and "Tides", which would later on be featured in their first full-length album, Apologies Are for the Weak. The band would sign with Rise Records in late 2008 before releasing their aforementioned debut album through the label in 2009.

According to the website of producer Joey Sturgis' Foundation Studios, the band had booked studio time in May 2010 to ostensibly record the follow-up to their debut album. Monument was released on August 17, 2010. In December 2010, they confirmed plans to appear at Warped Tour 2011. The album peaked at 10 on the Top Hard Rock Albums chart, 15 on the Top Independent Albums chart, and 31 on the Top Rock Albums chart. The band toured with Abandon All Ships, Sleeping with Sirens and Bury Tomorrow to support the album.

The band appeared on the We Came as Romans Merchnow.com + Arkaik Clothing "I'm Alive" Tour (September - October 2011) with Close To Home, Of Mice & Men, and Texas in July. Following the "I'm Alive" Tour, the band co-headlined the 'No Guts No Glory' tour with Pierce the Veil, Woe, Is Me, and Letlive. The band also appeared on the 2011 Scream it Like you Mean it tour with We Came as Romans, The Word Alive and This or the Apocalypse.

On March 8, 2012, the band announced that they had completed work on their new album, At Heart, and were set to release the album on May 29, 2012. To make last-minute changes, the band bumped back the release, to June 12, 2012.

The band soon set out on tour with Whitechapel, After the Burial, The Plot in You, Rescued by a Sinking Ship, and Structures throughout March 2012, followed by a European tour with Parkway Drive, The Ghost Inside and Confession through April. The band also set out to tour with Whitechapel, The Ghost Inside, Within the Ruins and The Plot in You in the US during May 2012. The band played on Warped Tour in mid-2012. They supported Killswitch Engage for the United States Disarm the Descent tour in mid-2013 with others.

=== Rise of the Lion and Deathless (2013–2016) ===
On December 14, 2013, the band stated that they are looking for a fan to get a tattoo of their infamous lion design for the cover of their forthcoming album. On February 25, 2014, Rise of the Lion was announced as the title of the new album. The album was released on April 29, 2014.

In January 2015, the band supported August Burns Red on the Frozen Flame Tour with Northlane, Fit for a King and Erra.

The band recorded their fifth studio album with Joey Sturgis, who recorded the band's first two records. Deathless was released on August 7, 2015.

=== SharpTone Records, Shadows Inside, and Curse of Existence (2016–2023) ===
On June 24, 2016 the band announced that they had left Rise Records and signed with SharpTone Records.

The band embarked on a headline North American tour in support of their sixth album, Shadows Inside, in 2017. That same year, they joined The Amity Affliction as a part of Motionless in White's "Graveyard Shift" tour. In 2018, they toured North America once again on the Gore Core Metal and More Tour, as support for Gwar and Hatebreed. In early 2019, the band supported August Burns Red on their Dangerous Tour. They played Monument in its entirety in mid-2019 in celebration of its nearing 10th-year anniversary, they co-headlined the tour with The Word Alive with support from After Life and Thousand Below.

In May 16, 2022, bassist and clean vocalist Ryan Neff joined As I Lay Dying as replacement for their former bassist Josh Gilbert. On September 2, 2022, the band released their seventh studio album, Curse of Existence.

=== Lineup changes, signing with Solid State, and Apologies Are for the Weak 15th anniversary (2024–present) ===
On May 31, 2024 the band announced the departures of guitarists B. J. Stead and Justin Aufdemkampe. They were replaced with Elisha Mullins.

On July 11, 2024, the band signed with Solid State Records. Following this, they announced a complete 15th anniversary re-recording of their debut album Apologies Are for the Weak, which released in the fall. The announcement was accompanied by the re-recorded version of "Forgive and Forget", featuring members of Fit for a King. The album features other guest vocals from members of Silent Planet, Bleeding Through, Carnifex, August Burns Red, and The Word Alive, among others.

On October 18th, 2024, Ryan Neff announced his departure from As I Lay Dying following what was later revealed to be a domestic abuse incident involving the band's lead vocalist Tim Lambesis, returning to full participation in Miss May I.

On January 23rd, 2025, the band disclosed that they were laying out demos for new material. In February 2025, the band was chosen as the replacement for As I Lay Dying at the Welcome to Rockville festival taking place in Daytona Beach, Florida on May 16th, 2025.

On August 28, 2025, the band released a single titled "Pray For Silence" which is from their upcoming eighth studio album which is set to be released in 2026.

== Musical style and influences ==
Miss May I's musical style has been described as metalcore or melodic metalcore, mixing melodic death metal and thrash metal riffs with hardcore punk. Almost all of their recorded songs feature both unclean vocals, provided by the band's lead vocalist Levi Benton, and clean vocals, provided by their bassist Ryan Neff (and formerly Josh Gillespie), in similar fashion to many other melodic metalcore bands.

The band has stated their main influences are: Metallica, Pantera, Deftones, Unearth, White Zombie, Gojira, As Blood Runs Black, All Shall Perish, As I Lay Dying, Arch Enemy, Killswitch Engage, Lamb of God, Atreyu, Underoath, All That Remains, In Flames, Five Finger Death Punch, Avenged Sevenfold, The Black Dahlia Murder, Thirty Seconds to Mars, Darkest Hour, Bleeding Through, Trivium, Winter Solstice, Bring Me the Horizon, Anti-Flag, Parkway Drive, and It Dies Today.

In an interview with Guitar World, the band discussed how their influences have changed over the years. Guitarist Justin Aufdemkampe said he started by covering basic blues, then moved to pop punk by covering Blink-182, and Green Day, then eventually learned lead guitar by listening to and copying his dad's Stevie Ray Vaughan records. In the 10th grade, Justin started learning Taking Back Sunday, Underoath and Avenged Sevenfold songs. However, once he saw Atreyu at Warped Tour, his taste in music abruptly shifted. He then discovered As I Lay Dying, All That Remains and Darkest Hour, and began writing fast, aggressive originals.

According to bassist Ryan Neff, his influences are: Unearth, Deftones, Pantera, As I Lay Dying, Darkest Hour, Underoath, As Cities Burn, August Burns Red, the Bled, the Color Morale, Florence and the Machine, Marilyn Manson, A Perfect Circle, Nine Inch Nails, Oceana, Pierce the Veil, PMtoday, Saosin, and Tool. In an interview with Alternative Press, Ryan said his favorite band of all time is White Zombie.

Guitarist B. J. Stead stated "I had been playing guitar for years, but not much metal. I mostly listen to Pink Floyd and straight rock." In an interview with Alternative Press, it was said that B.J.'s favorite band is Iron Maiden.

The band has stated on their influences:

Basically, any metal-core band that doesn't have keyboards and who aren't fake guys who just play instruments. We're trying to be as old school as possible, as it's been working out. So I'm happy with that.

In an interview with WIDB, Levi stated on behalf of his biggest musical influences: "As I Lay Dying is definitely the biggest one that really sets Miss May I where we are. We like a lot of All That Remains, Unearth, Darkest Hour and, recently, In Flames. This is weird, because it’s not really the thing that everyone would say, but we're really interested in Five Finger Death Punch. We’ve been researching how they do everything because their story’s really cool. But As I Lay Dying and All That Remains are probably the biggest ones, along with Killswitch Engage" Levi has stated his "dream tour" would be Lamb of God, As I Lay Dying, It Dies Today, and Atreyu.

In another interview, Levi Benton stated that he tries to make inspirational music rather than angry music. Through this, he uses his contemporary R&B influences such as Justin Timberlake, Jamie Foxx, and Usher. He also openly admits he listens to a lot of hip hop. His favorite artists are Dr. Dre, Yelawolf, Savage, Jay Z, and Eminem. The band has covered the song "Run This Town" by Jay Z featuring Kanye West and Rihanna for the Punk Goes Pop 3 album.

== Religious views ==
In an interview with Dayton Daily News writer Madeline Bush, when asked what they thought their music conveyed, Benton replied:

"We have been asked a lot if we are a Christian band due to our lyrics. And the answer to that is no, but some of us are Christians and others are not. But myself as a Christian, I try and not put the wrong negative message out in our lyrics. Most of what we stand for is just a band that plays for the crowd to be happy, and to love what we are doing as much as we do."

== Members ==
Miss May I, live at With Full Force 2018

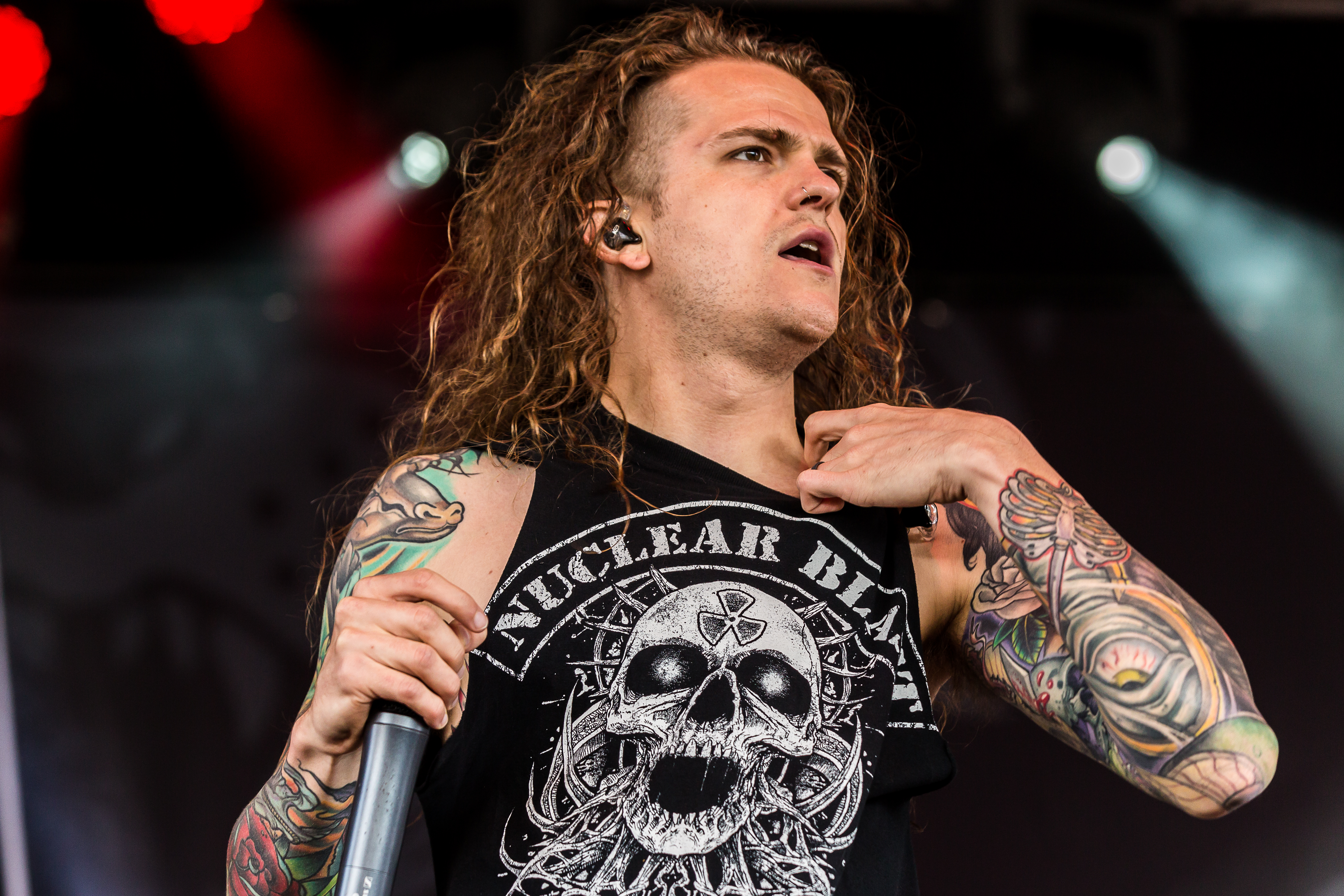
Lead vocalist Levi Benton

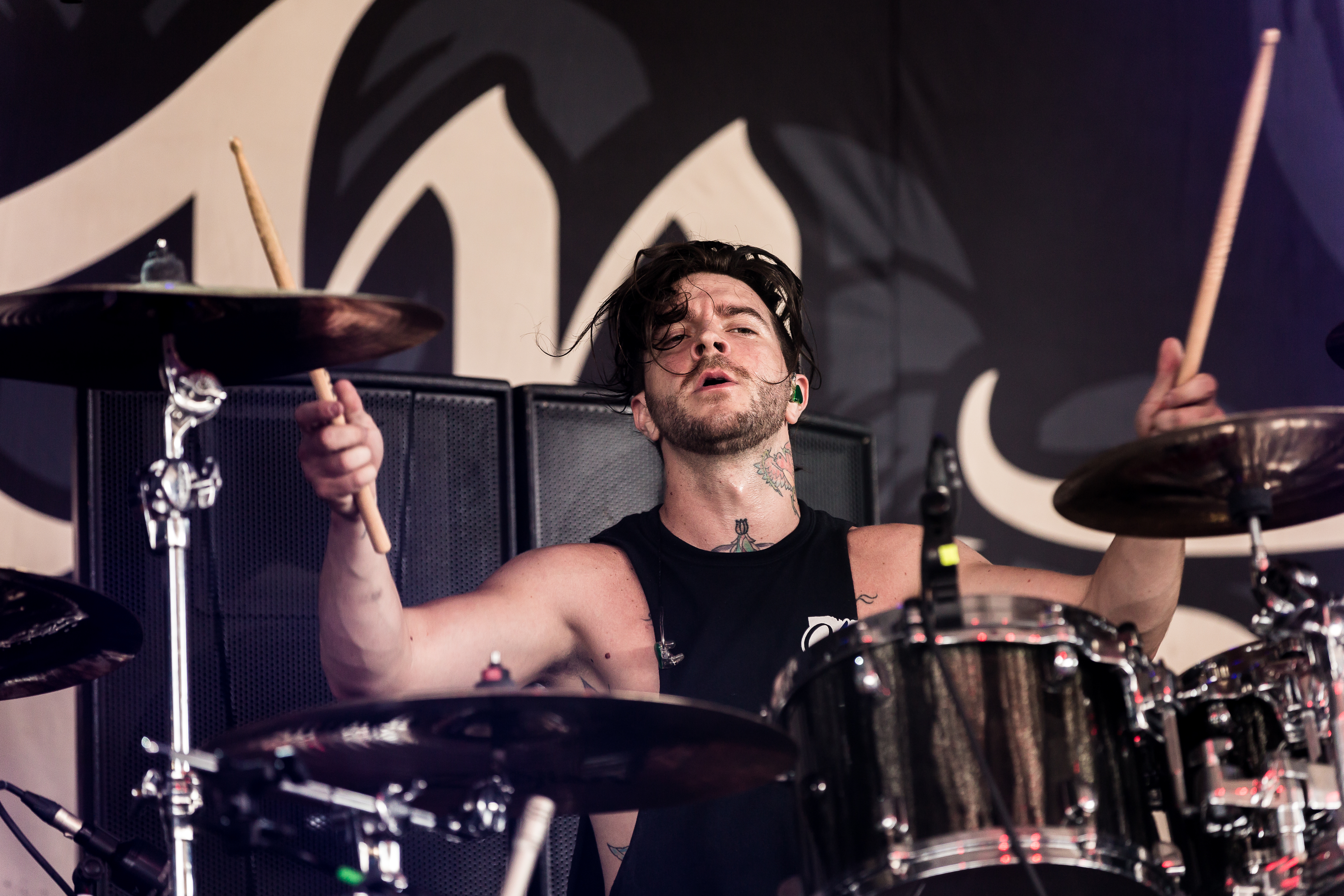
Drummer Jerod Boyd

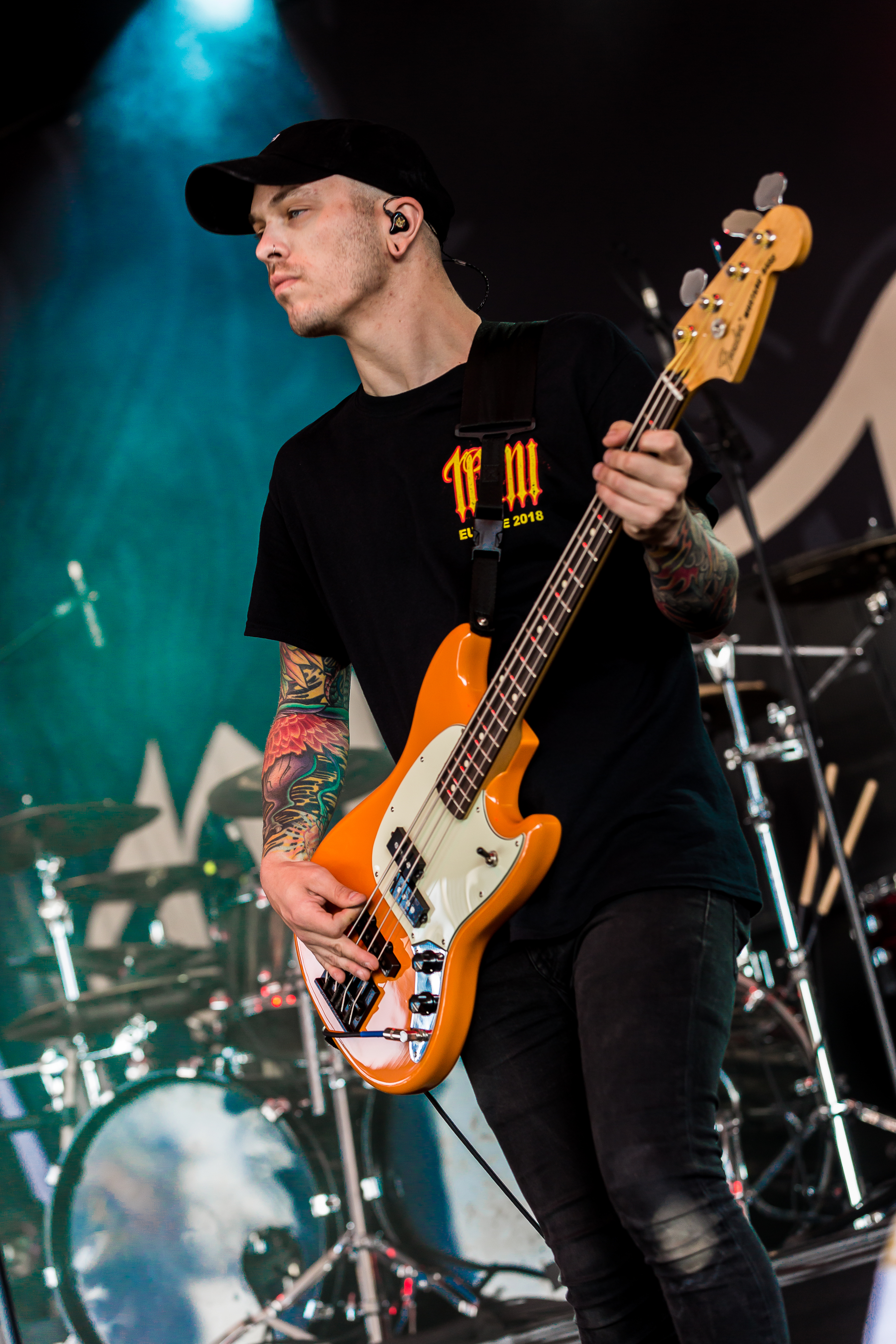
Bassist Ryan Neff

Current

- Levi Benton – lead vocals (2006–present)
- Jerod Boyd – drums (2006–present)
- Ryan Neff – bass, clean vocals (2006–2007, 2009–present)
- Elisha Mullins – guitars (2024–present; live member 2022–2024)

Former

- Josh Gillespie – bass, clean vocals (2007–2009)
- B. J. Stead – lead guitar (2006–2024), backing vocals (2014–2024)
- Justin Aufdemkampe – rhythm guitar (2006–2024), backing vocals (2014–2024)

Timeline

== Discography ==
Albums

Year	Album	Label	Chart peaks			
Year	Album	Label	US	US Rock	US Indie	US Hard Rock
2009	Apologies Are for the Weak	Rise	—	—	66	—
2010	Monument	Rise	76	31	15	10
2012	At Heart	Rise	32	12	5	3
2014	Rise of the Lion	Rise	21	6	4	2
2015	Deathless	Rise	49	5	4	2
2017	Shadows Inside	SharpTone	176	37	6	6
2022	Curse of Existence	SharpTone	—	—	—	—
2026	No Place for Me	Solid State	—	—	—	—
"—" denotes a release that did not chart.

Other releases

- Vows for a Massacre (self-released EP; 2007)
- Demo 2008 (self-released demo; 2008)

=== Music videos ===
Year	Song	Director
2009	"Architect" (demo version)	Thunder Down Country
2009	"Forgive and Forget"	Spencer Nicholson
2009	"Forgive and Forget (Saw VI Soundtrack)"	Spencer Nicholson
2010	"Relentless Chaos"	Thunder Down Country
2010	"Our Kings"	Thunder Down Country
2011	"Masses of a Dying Breed"	Thunder Down Country
2011	"Relentless Chaos (Live)"	Cole Dabney
2012	"Hey Mister"	Thunder Down Country
2012	"Day by Day"	Thunder Down Country
2012	"Ballad of a Broken Man"	Unknown
2014	"Gone"	Brad Golowin
2014	"Echoes"	Brad Golowin
2014	"You Want Me"	Unknown
2014	"Hero with No Name"	Unknown
2015	"I.H.E."	Max Moore
2015	"Deathless"	Max Moore
2015	"Turn Back the Time"	Max Moore
2017	"Lost in the Grey"	Ramon Boutviseth
2017	"Shadows Inside"	Unknown
2018	"Under Fire"	Nadeem A. Salam
2022	"Unconquered"	JOSIAHx
2022	"Bleed Together"	JOSIAHx
2022	"Earth Shaker"	JOSIAHx
2022	"Free Fall"	JOSIAHx
2025	"Pray for Silence"	Matt Ferland
2026	"Die On the Vine"	Garrett Drake
2026	"Sanctuary"	Garrett Drake and Josh Hart
2026	"Hand Me a Halo"	Garrett Drake and Josh Hart
2026	"Highbrow Thieves"	Eli Castillo
2026	"Bury Me Down"	Garrett Drake

=== Collaborations ===
Year	Song	Album	Artist
2010	"2012" (featuring Levi Benton)	Deceiver	The Word Alive
2011	"Napalm" (featuring Levi Benton)	Conviction	The Crimson Armada
2011	"Set in Stone" (featuring Levi Benton)	The End of Times EP	Ludlow Falls
2011	"Growing, Caving, Searching, Sinking" (featuring Ryan Neff)	Echoes & Answers	From Atlantis
2014	"The Void" (featuring Levi Benton)	Bloodwork	Texas in July
2016	"Stacking Bodies" (featuring Levi Benton)	Deathgrip	Fit for a King
2018	"Everything" (featuring Levi Benton)	Persevere	Sink the Ship
2018	"Paradigm Shift" (featuring Levi Benton)	Single	Classic Jack
2019	"An Eye for a Lie" (featuring Levi Benton)	Reborn EP	Out Last
