= Mathematics (disambiguation) =

Mathematics is a field of knowledge.

Mathematics may also refer to:

== Music ==
- Mathematics (producer), hip-hop producer and DJ
- Mathematik (rapper), rapper from Toronto
- Mathematics (album), a 1985 album by Melissa Manchester
- "Mathematics" (Cherry Ghost song), a song by Cherry Ghost
- "Mathematics" (Mos Def song), a song by Mos Def
- Mathematics, an EP by The Servant
- "Mathematics", a song by bbno$
- "Mathematics", a song by Little Boots from Hands
- "Mathematics", a song by Macintosh Plus from Floral Shoppe
- "Matematik", a song by Till Lindemann from F & M, 2019

== Other uses ==
- Mathematics (UIL), an American student mathematics competition
- Microsoft Mathematics, an educational program designed for Microsoft Windows
- Mathematics Magazine, a publication of the Mathematical Association of America
- Mathematics (journal), a semi-monthly peer-reviewed open-access scientific journal that covers all aspects of pure mathematics and applied mathematics

== See also ==
- Math (disambiguation)
- Mathematica (disambiguation)
- Category:Mathematics
- Portal:Mathematics
