= Rise of the Lion =

Studio album by Miss May I
- Released: April 25, 2014
- Recorded: 2013
- Studio: Studio X, Seattle, Washington
- Genre: Melodic metalcore
- Length: 35:54
- Label: Rise
- Producer: Terry Date

Miss May I chronology
At Heart (2012)	Rise of the Lion (2014)	Deathless (2015)

Singles from Rise of the Lion
- 1. "Gone" Released: February 27, 2014; 2. "Echoes" Released: April 1, 2014

Rise of the Lion is the fourth studio album by American metalcore band Miss May I. It was released in Australia, Canada, and Mexico on April 25, 2014, and in the US on April 29.

== Background ==
In the first major interview for the album, vocalist Levi Benton spoke with Jake Denning of AbsolutePunk, going into a few of Denning's favorite tracks from the album, but also explained the background behind the album title:

"Well, it's a very fan based record. All the lyrics are letters back from letters we've gotten from fans and haven't been able to write back. There are some topics we haven't faced, but things that have touched while reading letters in the past. We see many tattoos and crazy stuff with the lion and how much it means to fans. Basically the lion is a symbol for us and all of our fans, we just wanted to dedicate this to them. This is our follow-through record, and we think this is going to be a big one and a big fan-base growing album for us. This is the rise of the lion."

== Critical reception ==
Professional ratings
Review scores
Source	Rating
Alternative Press	4/5 stars
HM Magazine	4/5 stars

At Alternative Press, Phil Freeman rated the album four stars out of five, saying that "there's a definite humanity to the music" on the album that features "chugs and clean choruses all the throat-punching impact any fan could ask for." However, he writes that "Ultimately, this is a forceful, headlong album with no ballads or restful interludes among it 10 track", which is "sure to make fans very happy."

== Track listing ==
No.	Title	Length
1.	"Refuse to Believe"	3:55
2.	"Lunatik"	3:44
3.	"Gone"	3:38
4.	"Echoes"	4:03
5.	"You Want Me"	3:08
6.	"Tangled Tongues"	3:43
7.	"Hero with No Name"	3:27
8.	"Darker Days"	4:26
9.	"End of Me"	3:05
10.	"Saints, Sinners and Greats"	2:41
Total length:		35:54

Best Buy exclusive tracks
No.	Title	Length
11.	"Burn My Pages"	3:18
12.	"Last Letter"	3:41

Target exclusive tracks
No.	Title	Length
11.	"My Inferno"	3:36
12.	"Stereos"	3:31

== Personnel ==
Miss May I

- Levi Benton – lead vocals, lyrics
- Ryan Neff – bass guitar, clean vocals, lyrics, piano
- B.J. Stead – lead guitar, backing vocals
- Justin Aufdemkampe – rhythm guitar, backing vocals
- Jerod Boyd – drums

Production

- Production and mixing by Terry Date
- Engineering by Terry Date and Kevin Mills
- Mastering by Ted Jensen at Sterling Sound, New York
- Pre-production by Nathan Hook at Refraze Studios, Dayton, Ohio
- Composition and lyrics by Michael Brookbank
