= A Scent Like Wolves =

American metalcore band

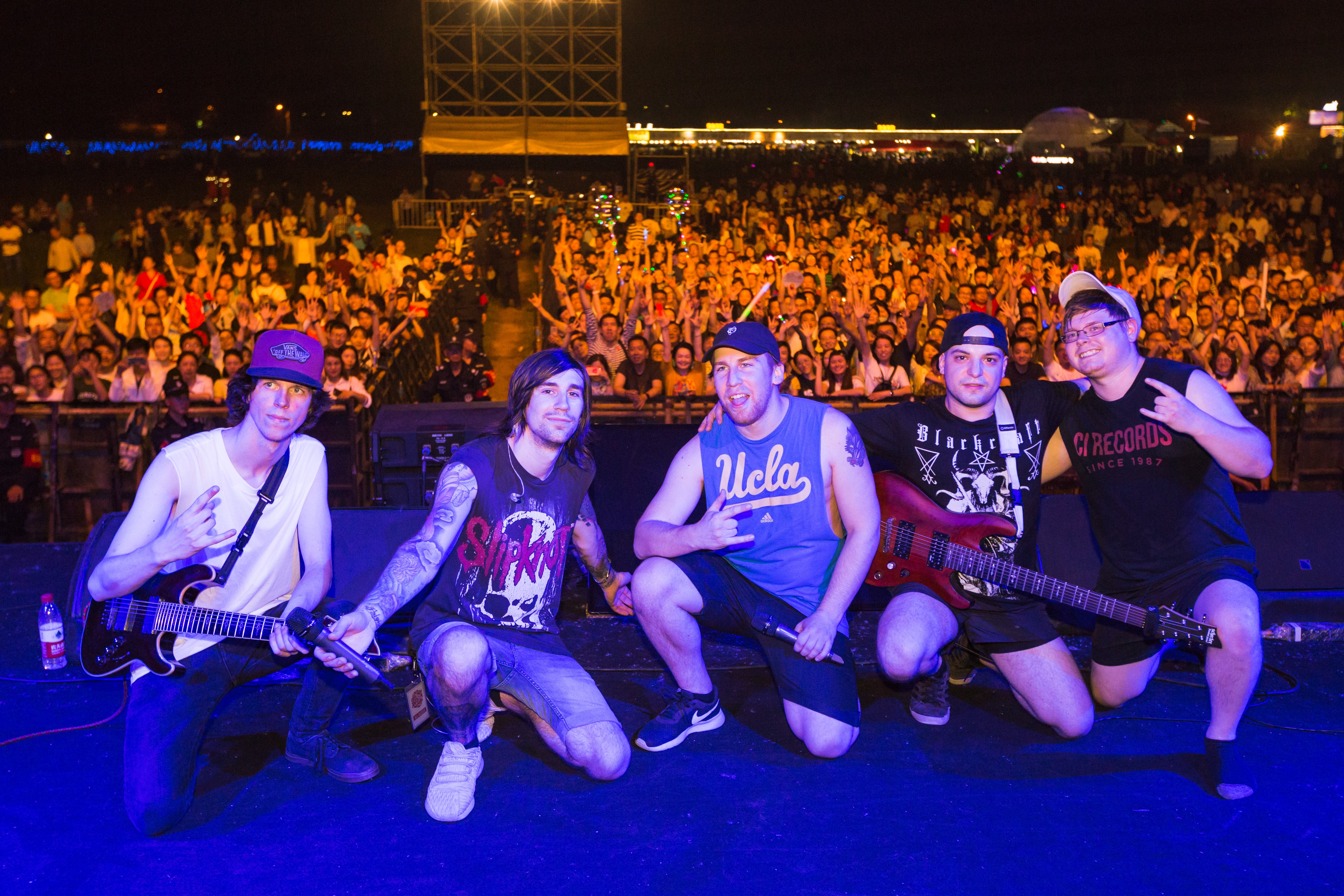
- A Scent Like Wolves live in 2018

Background information
- Origin: Lancaster, Pennsylvania, U.S.
- Genres: Metalcore
- Years active: 2010–present
- Labels: We Are Triumphant; CI Records
- Members: Al Boltz; Nick Boltz; Jeff Brown; Cody Frain; Blake McClimon
- Past members: Kyle Pettigrew; Robert Warden; Nate Kintzer; Billy Hoier; Ben Dieffenbach; Derek Sattazhan; Ryan Turley
- Website: aslwofficial.com

A Scent Like Wolves is an American metalcore band from Lancaster, Pennsylvania, established in 2010 by founding members Al Boltz and Jeff Brown. They are currently signed to Los Angeles record label We Are Triumphant, a former imprint of Victory Records.

== History ==
A Scent Like Wolves originally formed after a high school talent show in early 2010, taking the band name from a line in the movie Ninja Assassin. In November 2011, the artist won a local battle of the bands which led them to play nearby stadium, Santander Arena, with Hollywood Undead, We Came As Romans, amongst other groups. The band initially self-released their debut album And The Story Goes, on June 18, 2013. On November 2, 2013, A Scent Like Wolves performed at 'Reckless Fest II' alongside Asking Alexandria and 18 other bands held at the Lancaster County Convention Center.

On November 11, 2015, the band announced their signing to We Are Triumphant. On January 14, 2016, The band's sophomore album Frigid Future, would see an official release on March 18, 2016. Shortly after its initial release, a music video for the first single "Haunted" was premiered on March 30, 2016.

A Scent Like Wolves briefly signed to their hometown record label CI Records on February 26, 2018. The following day, the artist stated their new EP, Spirit Vessel, would be released on March 30, 2018. A video for “Angelwrath” featuring Ryo Kinoshita of Crystal Lake was released on March 15, 2018. A Scent Like Wolves announced a second tour of Asia on March 18, 2018. They toured China, South Korea, and Japan from April 26-May 13 with supporting bands End These Days, abstracts, and Sailing Before The Wind. The artist performed at Taihu Midi Music Festival on May 1, 2018 alongside bands Death Angel and At The Gates.

On November 24, 2020, A Scent Like Wolves announced their new album Mystic Auras and re-signed to label We Are Triumphant. The album features a wide range of notable vocalists such as JT Cavey (Erra), Booka Nile (Make Them Suffer), Matteo Gelsomino (Novelists (band)), and Brian Wille of the SharpTone Records band Currents. The album was produced by Grammy-nominated producers Carson Slovak & Grant McFarland of the Rise Records band Galactic Empire. Alternative Press shared the band's single "Poison" on January 13, 2021.

== Band Members ==
Current

- Al Boltz - vocals (2010–present)
- Nick Boltz - vocals (2012–present)
- Jeff Brown - guitar (2010–present)
- Cody Frain - drums (2014–present)
- Blake McClimon - guitar (2018–present)

Former

- Kyle Pettigrew - guitar (2015–2020)
- Nate Kintzer - rhythm guitar (2012–2015)
- James Reber - rhythm guitar (2016-2017)
- Billy Hoier - bass guitar (2011–2016)
- Ben Dieffenbach - drums (2012-2014)
- Derek Sattazhan - drums (2010–2012)

Former Touring Members

- Robert Warden - guitar/bass (2017–2018)
- Ryan Turley - bass (2016–2017)

== Discography ==
=== Studio albums ===
Title	Details	Billboard chart positions				
Title	Details	Alt. New Artists	Hard Music	Heatseeker	Indie Albums	Top Digital
And The Story Goes	Released: June 13, 2013; Label: We Are Triumphant; Formats: CD, digital download; Producer(s): Carson Slovak, Grant McFarland	—	—	—	—	—
Frigid Future	Released: March 18, 2016; Label: We Are Triumphant; Formats: CD, digital download, vinyl; Producer(s): Carson Slovak, Grant McFarland	—	—	—	—	—
Mystic Auras	Released: February 19, 2021; Label: We Are Triumphant; Formats: CD, digital download, vinyl; Producer(s): Carson Slovak, Grant McFarland	14	36	55	130	192
Distant Dystopia	Released: February 23, 2024; Label: Theoria; Formats: CD, digital download, vinyl; Producer(s): Carson Slovak, Grant McFarland					

=== EPs ===
Year	Album details
2018	Spirit Vessel: Released: February 19, 2021; Label: We Are Triumphant; Formats: CD, digital download; Producer(s): Carson Slovak, Grant McFarland

=== Singles ===
Year	Title
2015	"Alternate Lives": Released: December 18, 2015; Label: We Are Triumphant
2017	"Inside Out": Released: December 9, 2017; Label: self-released
