= Matha (disambiguation) =

A matha is a monastic and similar religious establishment in Hinduism and Jainism.

Matha may also refer to:

- Matha (given name), a list of people
- Armand Matha (1861–1930), French anarchist
- Canton of Matha, France
  - Matha, Charente-Maritime, a commune in the canton
- Matha Strait, Antarctica
- Matha (film), a 2012 Sri Lankan film

== See also ==
- Metha, a list of people with the surname
