= One Reality =

Studio album by Texas in July
- Released: April 26, 2011
- Studio: Planet Z studios
- Genre: Metalcore
- Length: 30:22
- Label: Equal Vision (Northern America); Nuclear Blast (Europe)
- Producer: Chris "Zeuss" Harris

Texas in July chronology
I Am (2009)	One Reality (2011)	Texas in July (2012)

Singles from One Reality
- 1. "1000 Lies" Released: April 15, 2011

One Reality is the second studio album by American metalcore band, Texas in July. It was released through Equal Vision Records on April 26, 2011 in the U.S., and on October 7, 2011 in Europe. Produced by Chris "Zeuss" Harris, the album is the band's first release to feature rhythm guitarist Chris Davis, following the departure of founding member Logan Maurer. The album is also the band's first release through Equal Vision, and its first effort to chart on the Billboard 200, peaking at #174.

== Background ==
Texas In July announced that they'd signed with Equal Vision records in July 2010.

In a February 2011 interview with Indie Vision Music, bassist and lyricist Ben Witkowski shared that the upcoming release would feature simplified drumming, and would be easier listening than their prior releases. He also shared that he was aware that the band was frequently compared to August Burns Red, but felt that the band would be stepping away from that with the upcoming release. Drummer Adam Gray would share in a May 2011 interview with Modern Drummer Magazine that the drums for One Reality were recorded in a time box of two days.

After a number of tours, the band announced in early March that their upcoming release "One Reality" would be released on April 26, and shared the track list.

On April 15, 2011, the band debuted a single from the album titled "1000 Lies" exclusively through Noisecreep. On the meaning behind the song, bassist Ben Witkowski explained:

"Despite the title of this track, the message behind the song is encouraging and confident. It's about walking through life listening to yourself, becoming what you aspire to be, and discovering your self-governed future that you have created for yourself. It's about not backing down for anything. The progression of this song musically from our first record, 'I Am,' is tremendous. We had a great time writing and recording 'One Reality,' and are extremely excited for the release."

On July 18, again exclusively via Noisecreep, the band released a music video for the track. The video was filmed in the band's hometown Ephrata, Pa. and co-directed by Rasa Acharya and Gaura Vani. The video features artist and actress, Dessie Jackson.

The album's sound was a departure from the band's prior releases, featuring less riffing and shredding, following the departure of founding member and primary music-writer Logan Maurer, who would leave the band early in the writing process for "One Reality." Bassist Ben Witkowski explained the band was in a "weird place" losing Maurer, sharing:

"We love the record, but it definitely did tone it down as far as riffing and wild drums. And just overall song structure for a couple of the songs, was very mellow. This is just how we were at the time. We were taking on the challenge of writing a record without a huge piece of the band at the time. It was like losing a brother.

In August 2011, the band announced they had signed a deal with Nuclear Blast to distribute their music in European territories. They also shared that One Reality would be released in Europe on October 7, featuring exclusive bonus material.

Following the album's release, the band headlined a European tour in fall of 2011. In July 2012, the band made the entirety of the album available as a free download via PureVolume. The album's artwork was provided by Sol Amstutz.

== Commercial Performance and Critical Reception ==
Professional ratings
Review scores
Source	Rating
Time For Metal Magazine	9/10 stars
Indie Vision Music	3/5 stars
The Music	3/5 stars
Metal Temple	6/10 stars

"One Reality" was the band's first effort to chart on the Billboard 200, debuting (and peaking) at #174 in the week of May 14, and selling roughly 3,300 copies in its first week.

Indie Vision Music reviewer "Steve" gave the album 3/5 stars, calling it more mature and polished than the band's prior release. Alternative Press called the album "excellent pit fuel" and praised the inclusion of non-genre-confining elements. The Music gave the album 3/5 stars, calling the band's sound "a poor man's August Burns Red, but calling the album "brutal, harsh and, surprisingly, at times a technical triumph." Metal Temple gave the album a 6/10 score, also drawing comparisons to August Burns Red, believing that the band had a lot of potential, but that the album lacked personality.

In April 2011, Alternative Press named Texas In July to its "100 bands you need to know 2011" list.

== Track listing ==
No.	Title	Length
1.	"Introduction"	1:30
2.	"Magnolia"	4:29
3.	"1000 Lies"	2:56
4.	"Dreamer"	2:52
5.	"Dying World"	2:50
6.	"No Greater Love"	3:26
7.	"May" (Instrumental)	2:44
8.	"Our Freedom"	2:47
9.	"Cyclops"	3:09
10.	"Pretender"	2:47
11.	"One Reality"	3:32
Total length:		30:22

== Personnel ==
Texas In July

- Alex Good - Vocals
- Christian Royer - Lead guitar
- Chris Davis - Rhythm guitar
- Ben Witkowski - Bass
- Adam Gray - Drums

Production

- Produced, Engineered, Mixed & mastered by Chris "Zeuss" Harris
- A&R by Daniel Sandshaw
- Management by Jeremy Weiss (The CI Companies) & John Daley (Blood Company)
- PR by Natalie Bisignano
- Booking by Dave Shapiro & JJ Cassiere (The Agency Group)
- Artwork by Sol Amstutz (solamstutz.com)

== Charts ==
Chart (2011)	Peak position
US Billboard 200	174
US Heatseekers Albums (Billboard)	3
US Independent Albums (Billboard)	31
US Top Rock Albums (Billboard)	46
