= Joe Stote =

Joe Stote, sometimes called Stotes, was the former percussionist/keyboard player for experimental/progressive rock band, 3. Prior to 3, he played guitar in the band Peacebomb, whose most notable appearance was during the Woodstock '94 Festival, in Saugerties, NY.

Joe Stote was also a founding member of the rock band The Hybrids. The Hybrids formed in 'The Euphoric Bubble' that is Davis & Elkins College in 1984, most often playing in the on campus bar, The Ice House Many of the members have since gone on to have successful musical careers. They still perform live every year or so.

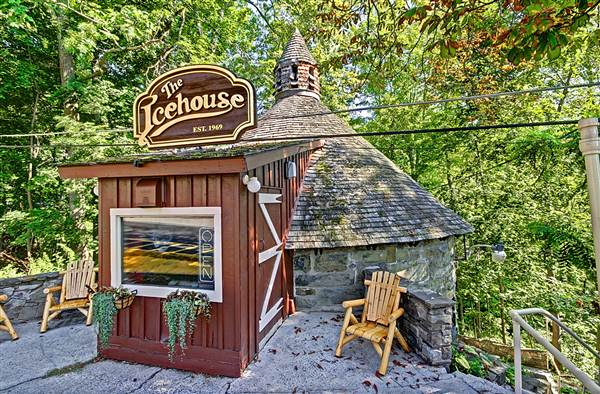
Street level front entrance to 3 story stone Ice House. A pub on campus of Davis & Elkins College

Joe was instrumental in the formation of Shooky Bones, a jam band that played bars and colleges throughout the East Coast during the late 1980's and early 1990's. Recording from Internet Archive: On 10/28/89 the band opened for Phish at The Chance in Poughkeepsie, NY.

The Hybrids, Shooky Bones and Peace Bomb all played the Ice House during Joe's career.

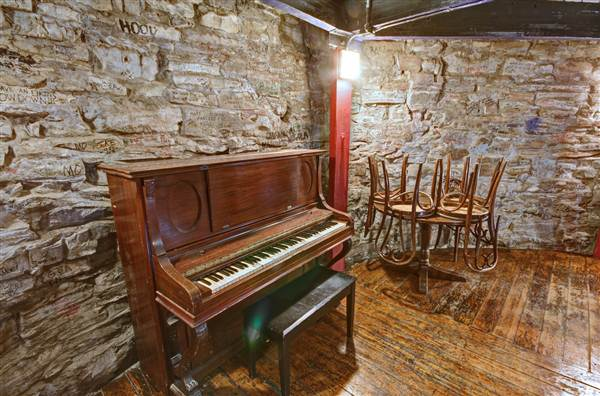
2nd floor interior where bands set up inside The Ice House, Davis & Elkins College, Elkins W.V.

Joseph Wayne Stote, 59, of Kingston, New York, died March 23, 2024, of cancer.

== Discography with 3 ==
- Summercamp Nightmare (2003, Planet Noise)
- Wake Pig (2004, Planet Noise / 2005, Metal Blade)
- These Iron Bones (2007, iTunes exclusive)
- The End is Begun (2007, Metal Blade)
