= Metha =

Metha is a surname. Notable people with the surname include:

- K. M. M. Metha (1926–2013), Indian politician
- Mu. Metha (born 1945), Indian poet and songwriter
- Scat Metha (1913–1975), American baseball player

== See also ==
- Matha (disambiguation)
  - Armand Matha (1861–1930), French anarchist
