= No Place for Me (album) =

Studio album by Miss May I
- Released: October 2, 2026
- Genre: Metalcore
- Length: 33:12
- Label: Solid State
- Producer: Nick Sampson

Miss May I chronology
Curse of Existence (2022)	No Place for Me (2026)

Singles from No Place for Me
- 1. "Pray for Silence" Released: August 28, 2025; 2. "Die On the Vine" Released: February 13, 2026; 3. "Sanctuary" Released: July 10, 2026; 4. "Hand Me a Halo" Released: July 31, 2026; 5. "Death Threat" Released: August 21, 2026; 6. "Highbrow Thieves" Released: September 11, 2026

No Place for Me is the eighth studio album by the American metalcore band Miss May I. It was released on October 2, 2026, through Solid State Records. This is the band's first album without guitarists B.J. Stead and Justin Aufdemkampe, who both left the band on May 31, 2024. It is also the first album to feature guitarist Elisha Mullins. It was produced by Nick Sampson.

== Track listing ==
Track listing and song lengths are adapted from Apple Music.

No Place for Me track listing
No.	Title	Length
1.	"Sanctuary"	3:25
2.	"Portrait of Pain"	3:18
3.	"Hand Me a Halo"	3:20
4.	"Pray for Silence"	3:54
5.	"Death Threat"	3:03
6.	"Die On the Vine"	3:07
7.	"Fire Falls"	2:50
8.	"Bury Me Down"	3:41
9.	"Ashes of the Altar"	3:30
10.	"Highbrow Thieves"	3:04
Total length:		33:12

== Personnel ==
Credits are adapted from the album's liner notes, Apple Music, and Kerrang!.

=== Miss May I ===
- Levi Benton – lead vocals
- Ryan Neff – clean vocals, bass guitar
- Jerod Boyd – drums
- Elisha Mullins – guitars, engineering

=== Additional contributors ===
- Nick Sampson – production, engineering, mixing
- Ted Jensen – mastering
- Jack Daniels – engineering
- Ryan Sanders – art direction, design
