= Texas in July (album) =

Studio album by Texas in July
- Released: October 9, 2012
- Genre: Metalcore
- Length: 33:23
- Label: Equal Vision (Northern America)
- Producer: Will Putney

Texas in July chronology
One Reality (2011)	Texas in July (2012)	Bloodwork (2014)

Singles from Texas in July
- 1. "Bed of Nails" Released: September 11, 2012

Deluxe Edition
- Deluxe Edition album cover

Texas in July is the third studio album from Texas in July. The album was produced by Will Putney, recorded at Machine Shop Studios in Belleville, New Jersey, and released on October 9, 2012, with "Bed of Nails", the first single from the album, released on September 11, 2012. The entire album was streamed online one week prior to its release.

The album features percussion from Matt Greiner of August Burns Red, vocals from Dave Stephens of We Came as Romans and Chadwick Johnson of Hundredth.

The album peaked at No. 4 in the Billboard Top Heatseekers chart.

== Track listing ==
1. "Initiate" – 0:56
2. "Cry Wolf" – 3:19
3. "Shallow Point" – 2:38
4. "Without a Head" (featuring Chadwick Johnson of Hundredth) – 3:54
5. "Bed of Nails" – 2:59
6. "Repressed Memories" – 3:37
7. "C4" (featuring Dave Stephens of We Came As Romans) – 3:43
8. "Crux Lust" – 3:24
9. "Paranoia" – 3:05
10. "Black Magic" – 2:58
11. "Cloudy Minds" (featuring Matt Greiner of August Burns Red) – 3:10
12. "Time-Lapse" - 3:28 (Deluxe Edition Bonus)
13. "03 Deville" - 4:20 (Deluxe Edition Bonus)
14. "Forbidden Fruit" - 4:20 (Deluxe Edition Bonus)
