= Archan Nair =

German-based artist and illustrator (born 1982)

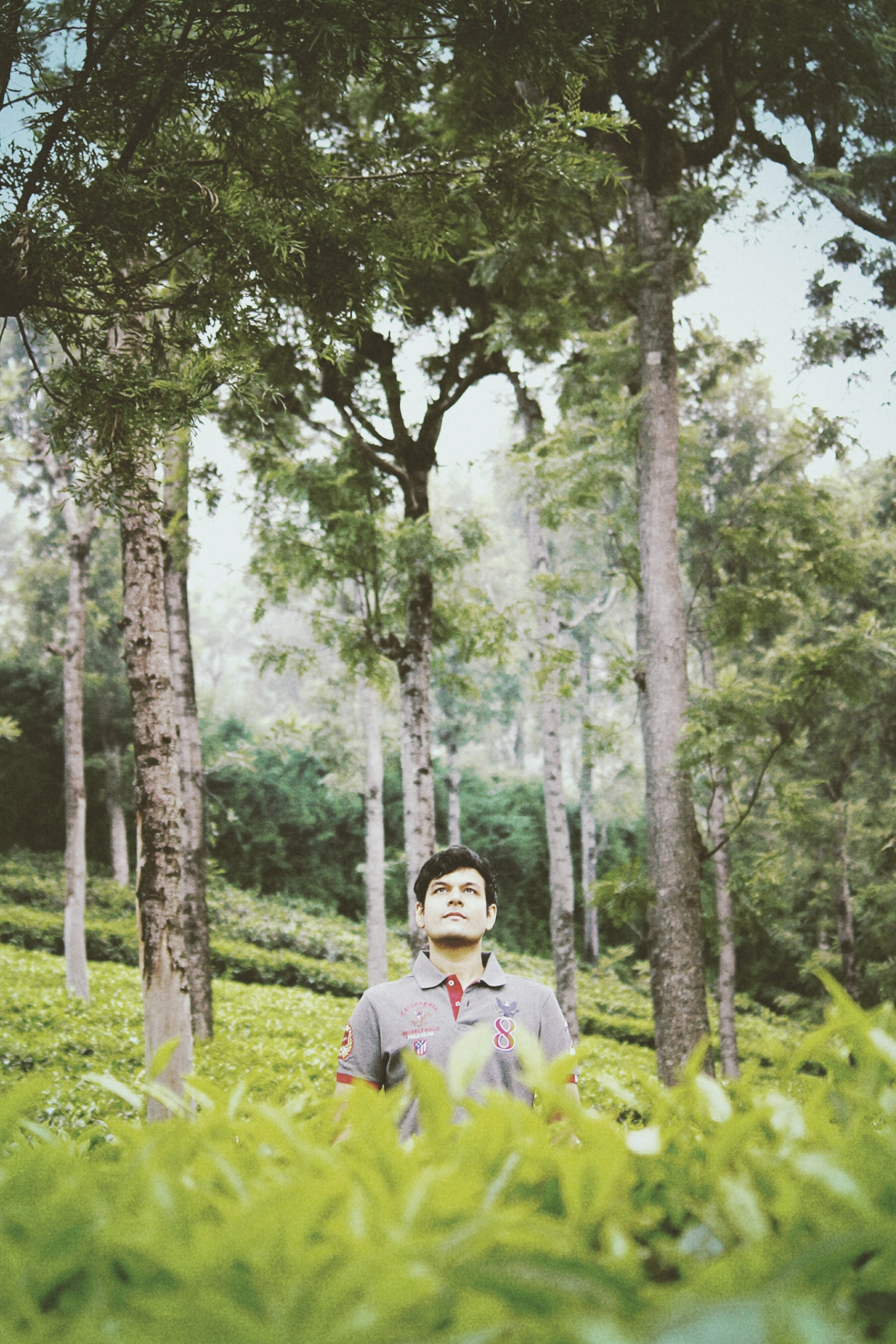
- Born: 1982 (age 43–44)
- Education: Self taught
- Known for: Artist, art director, digital artist and illustrator

Archan Nair is a visual artist, and illustrator based in Berlin, Germany. Known for his specialisation in digital art and mixed media, some of Archan's clients include brands like Sony, Netflix, GQ, Htc, Samsung, Electric Forest, Red Bull, Adobe, Nike among many others.

== Early life ==
Archan Nair was born and raised in India. Formerly a fashion major and entrepreneur, Archan started painting in 2006 at the age of 24 and made the shift as an independent artist in 2007. Archan started his journey as a Digital Artist and Illustrator in the early 2000s right at the beginning of Digital Art, and later moved to Germany.

== Career ==
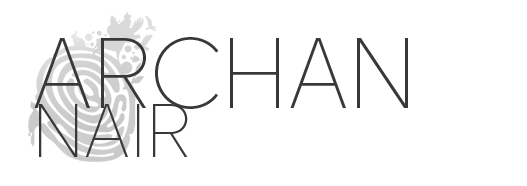

Archan began painting in 2006 at the age of 24 and started his career as an independent artist in 2007. Since then, he has collaborated with various brands around the globe. Some of Archan's clients include Sony, Nike, Red Bull, General Motors, Dodge, Microsoft, GQ, Vogue, Infiniti, Logitech, Netflix, Adobe etc. Archan has been featured in various publications including VICE, Vogue, Times of India, Computer Arts, Digital Arts, Advanced Photoshop, GQ, BAK, Vanity Fair, among many others and has achieved recognition from music artists such as Kanye West. He has also done collaborations with celebrity artists like Chris Brown, Lindsay Lohan and Justine Bateman. He also likes to work with different music bands and in an interview with RollingStone he said "Most of the time, the musician gives me a freehand and creative freedom to do anything I would like, which I love, as I love translating the sonic vibrations into visuals. Sometimes, they do give a small brief on some of the elements they would like and leave the rest to me.”

== Notable works ==
=== Nike ===
In 2011, Archan created a series of five visuals for the ICC Cricket World Cup Nike campaign. The visual artworks were printed on T-shirts and were available as a limited edition series in stores Across Asia and selected countries. In 2012, Nike curated an exhibition where Archan created 2 massive Artworks among other known artists and designers from across the globe.

=== Sony ===
In 2013, Sony collaborated with Archan to create a visual artwork on their flagship mobile device the Xperia Z Ultra. An exclusive film was made on the process and Archan's story behind the creation of the artwork. The visual was also printed as limited edition signed posters.
