= At Heart =

Studio album by Miss May I
- Released: June 12, 2012
- Recorded: January – March 2012
- Studios: The Machine Shop Recording Studio, Belleville, New Jersey
- Genres: Melodic metalcore, post-hardcore
- Length: 44:38
- Label: Rise
- Producer: Machine

Miss May I chronology
Monument (2010)	At Heart (2012)	Rise of the Lion (2014)

Singles from At Heart
- 1. "Hey Mister" Released: May 3, 2012; 2. "Day by Day" Released: June 7, 2012; 3. "Ballad of a Broken Man" Released: August 23, 2012

At Heart is the third studio album by American metalcore band Miss May I. The album was scheduled for release on May 29, 2012, but delayed to June 12, 2012. At Heart generally received positive reviews, noting the "mature" shift in sound with the band. The first single released from it was "Hey Mister" along with its accompanying music video.

The album entered the Billboard 200 at number 32, selling over 12,000 copies in its first week.

== Musical style ==
At Heart is a melodic metalcore album that has been compared to the likes of Killswitch Engage, Shadows Fall, and Heaven Shall Burn. The album employs heavy metal guitar riffs, hardcore-influenced breakdowns, death growls and clean vocals. Like its predecessors, At Heart also contains elements of thrash metal and melodic death metal.

== Release ==
Throughout the beginning of 2012, Miss May I were recording a new album for release some time during the summer. On March 8, 2012, the band announced that they had completed work on their new album titled At Heart and were set to release it on May 29, 2012. However, according to an interview by Levi Benton with, in order to incorporate last minute changes the band delayed the release to June 12. The first song leaked was "Hey Mister" that Rise Records premiered onto YouTube.

Benton used his "thank yous" in album to propose to his wife, Jojo Bitter.

Professional ratings
Review scores
Source	Rating
About.com	3.5/5 stars
AllMusic	3/5 stars
Punknews.org	3.5/5 stars
Under The Gun Review	6/10

== Track listing ==
All tracks are written by Levi Benton, Ryan Neff and Alberto de Icaza.

No.	Title	Length
1.	"At Heart"	0:49
2.	"Hey Mister"	3:56
3.	"Opening Wounds"	4:14
4.	"Leech"	4:16
5.	"Second to No One"	3:59
6.	"Sirens Song"	3:53
7.	"Day by Day"	3:35
8.	"Bleeding Out"	2:59
9.	"Road of the Lost"	3:23
10.	"Found Our Way"	2:47
11.	"Gold to Rust"	3:26
12.	"Live This Life"	3:48
13.	"Ballad of a Broken Man"	3:40
Total length:		44:38

== Personnel ==
Miss May I

- Levi Benton – lead vocals
- Ryan Neff – bass guitar, clean vocals
- B.J. Stead – lead guitar
- Justin Aufdemkampe – rhythm guitar
- Jerod Boyd – drums, percussion

Production

- Machine – producer, engineering, mixing
- Brian Gardner – mastering
- Alberto de Icaza – co-mixing
- Mark Bucci – assistant
- Adam Cichocki – assistant
- Randy LeBeouf – assistant
- Chris Rubey – assistant
- Nick Scott – engineering/co-production
- Clinton Bradley – sound design
- Zac Schwiet – design
- Rick Wait – photography
