= The Chameleon Club =

Music venue in Lancaster, Pennsylvania, U.S.

- "Chameleon"
- Interactive map of The Chameleon Club
- Address: 223 North Water Street
- Location: Lancaster, Pennsylvania, U.S.
- Coordinates: 40°2′29.8″N 76°18′31″W
- Owner: Nick Skiadas
- Seating type: Standing room only
- Capacity: Estimated 1,000
- Type: Music venue
- Events: Punk rock Hardcore punk Jazz; Blues

Construction
- Opened: 1985
- Expanded: 2008
- Closed: 2020

Website
- www.chameleonclub.net

The Chameleon Club was a music venue located in the historic downtown Lancaster, Pennsylvania.

== History ==
Founded by Rich Ruoff and Alexandra Brown in 1985, the Chameleon Club was originally located in the back room of a prominent fine dining restaurant called Tom Paine's in honor of Thomas Paine. At its conception, the small approximately 100 person capacity room offered performances of live, original music in Lancaster.

In 1988, three years after its opening, the club was relocated to the 200 block of Prince Street with an entrance on Water Street. Circa 1995, the venue was signed on to do a live television show entitled "Live at the Chameleon Club" which aired on PRISM Network, a now defunct Philadelphia area cable network.

In 2002, following a questionable police raid, Rich Ruoff sold the Chameleon Club. This was the first time the club was sold to a non-founding entity. In less than a year it was again sold to current owner Nick Skiadas.

In 2008, a major renovation took place in which the adjacent building was acquired and integrated into the existing facility. During that time, the stage lighting was overhauled to include low heat/power LED lighting, and the stage was enlarged to provide more area for touring bands.

A feature-length documentary film was made about the venue.

On September 4, 2020, the club's management announced that the downtown location would be closing. Although the article stated that a new venue would open in 2021, as of June they are only promoting events in other locations on their Facebook page.

== Notable artist launches ==
- Gregg Allman and Dickey Betts kicked off their reunion here at the club.
- August Burns Red whose original record label, C.I. Records resides next door in Lancaster, Pennsylvania
- Live
- Galactic Empire
- FUEL
- Phish played at the club in February 1990
