= Sadaharu =

- Gender: Male

Origin
- Origin: Japanese
- Meaning: Different meanings depending on the kanji used

Sadaharu (written: 貞治) is a masculine Japanese given name. Notable people with the name include:

- Sadaharu Aoki (青木 定治; born 1968), Japanese Pastry chef with boutique in Paris
- Sadaharu Oh (王貞治; born 1940), Japanese-Taiwanese baseball player and manager
- Sadaharu Tanikawa (谷川 貞治; born 1961), Japanese journalist
- Sadaharu Yagi, Japanese-born record producer, mixing engineer and recording engineer

== See also ==
- Sadahiro
- Sadhara
- Sadhora
- Siddhara
