= Revisions (album) =

Studio album by 3
- Released: October 27, 2009
- Recorded: Woodstock, NY
- Genre: Progressive rock
- Length: 43:44
- Label: Metal Blade Records
- Producer: 3

3 chronology
The End Is Begun (2007)	Revisions (2009)	The Ghost You Gave to Me (2011)

Professional ratings
Review scores
Source	Rating
Allmusic	3.5/5 stars
About.com	4/5 stars
Sputnikmusic	3.5/5 stars
MusicEmissions	3/5 stars
Blistering.com	7.5/10 stars

Revisions is 3's fifth full-length album and the third released by Metal Blade Records. On August 26, 2009, 3 announced Revisions, and stating in the liner notes that they felt that those songs "...deserved a second chance, a 'revision,' if you will."

== Track listing ==
1. "Anyone Human" (1998) - 3:54
2. "Rabid Animals" (2000) - 4:04
3. "The Better Half of Me" (2001) - 3:38
4. "Automobile" (1998) - 4:14
5. "Why" (2002) - 3:53
6. "Lexicon of Extremism" (2006) - 2:47
7. "Fable" (2002) - 4:52
8. "You’ve Been Shot" (1998) - 4:48
9. "Halloween" (2002) - 2:59
10. "The Emerald Undertow" (1998) - 4:43
11. "The Game" (1998) - 3:52
