= The Ghost You Gave to Me =

Studio album by 3
- Released: October 11, 2011
- Recorded: Woodstock, NY
- Genre: Progressive rock
- Length: 54:24
- Label: Metal Blade Records
- Producer: Michael Birnbaum, Chris Bittner

3 chronology
Revisions (2009)	The Ghost You Gave to Me (2011)

Professional ratings
Review scores
Source	Rating
Blistering	8/10 stars
Blabbermouth.net	8/10

The Ghost You Gave to Me is the sixth full-length album by progressive rock band, 3, released by Metal Blade Records on October 11, 2011.

== Track listing ==
1. "Sirenum Scopuli" - 1:11
2. "React" - 4:11
3. "Sparrow" - 4:04
4. "High Times" - 4:37
5. "Numbers" - 4:39
6. "One with the Sun" - 6:09
7. "The Ghost You Gave to Me" - 3:56
8. "Pretty" - 4:51
9. "Afterglow" - 4:11
10. "It's Alive" - 3:51
11. "Only Child" - 7:18
12. "The Barrier" - 5:27

== Personnel ==
- Joey Eppard - guitars, vocals
- Billy Riker - guitars
- Chris Gartmann - drums, percussion
- Daniel Grimsland - bass guitar, backing vocals
