= Cmath =

cmath or CMath may stand for:

- The <cmath> header file in C++, alias of <math.h>
- cmath (complex math), a library in Python (programming language)
- CMath, post-nominal letters for a chartered mathematician in the UK
