= Sadahiro =

- Gender: Male

Origin
- Origin: Japanese
- Meaning: Different meanings depending on the kanji used

Sadahiro (written: 定博, 定広 or 貞博) is a masculine Japanese given name. Notable people with the name include:

- Sadahiro Miwa (三輪 定広; born 1941), Japanese weightlifter
- Sadahiro Sunaga (須永 定博; born 1934), Japanese rower
- Takanonami Sadahiro (貴ノ浪 貞博; 1971–2015), Japanese sumo wrestler and coach
