= Apologies Are for the Weak =

Studio album by Miss May I
- Released: June 23, 2009; August 23, 2024 (15th Anniversary Edition)
- Recorded: 2008–2009
- Studio: The Foundation Recording Studios, Connersville, Indiana
- Genre: Metalcore; deathcore; melodic death metal; thrash metal
- Length: 34:15; 34:26 (15th Anniversary Edition)
- Label: Rise; Solid State (15th Anniversary Edition)
- Producer: Joey Sturgis: Elisha Mullins; Jack Daniels; (15th Anniversary Edition)

Miss May I chronology
Demo 2008 (2008)	Apologies Are for the Weak (2009)	Monument (2010)

15th Anniversary Edition cover
- Artwork used for the 15th Anniversary Edition cover

Singles from Apologies Are for the Weak (15th Anniversary Edition)
- 1. "Forgive and Forget" Released: July 12, 2024; 2. "Architect" Released: August 2, 2024

Professional ratings
Review scores
Source	Rating
Rock Freaks	7/10

Apologies Are for the Weak is the debut studio album by American metalcore band Miss May I, and is their only album with bassist and clean vocalist Josh Gillespie. The album reached number 29 on Billboard's Top Heatseekers, and number 66 on Top Independent Albums.

== Music ==
The album stylistically borrows from 2000s metalcore and deathcore. The album's guitar riffs have drawn comparisons to Unearth.

== Post-release ==
The album sold well over 25,000 copies in one year. Music videos were made for two of the songs, "Architect" and "Forgive and Forget". The album's title track was featured in the 2011 video game Saints Row: The Third, and "Forgive and Forget" was included in the soundtrack of the 2009 movie Saw VI.

Apologies Are for the Weak is also the only release by the band to include bassist and clean vocalist Josh Gillespie. After this album, Gillespie would depart from the band which had original bass player, Ryan Neff rejoin Miss May I.

== Music videos ==
The video for "Forgive and Forget" was the first music video released from the album. Previous to this album, Miss May I had a music video produced for their song "Architect" from their demo tape Demo 2008 (before the band was signed to Rise).

== 15th Anniversary Edition ==
In celebration for the 15th anniversary of the album, the band released a re-recorded version of the whole album on August 23, 2024 with appearances from notable acts such as Bleeding Through, After the Burial, August Burns Red, Carnifex, The Word Alive, Our Last Night, Silent Planet, Currents, Impending Doom, and Fit for a King.

== Track listing ==
All lyrics are written by Levi Benton; all music is composed by Miss May I, except where noted.

No.	Title	Music	Length
1.	"A Dance with Aera Cura"	Miss May I, Joey Sturgis	3:19
2.	"Architect"		4:07
3.	"Not Our Tomorrow"	Miss May I, Sturgis	3:12
4.	"Arms of the Messiah"		3:15
5.	"Apologies Are for the Weak"		3:12
6.	"Harlots Breath"		3:56
7.	"Tides"		3:18
8.	"Blessing with a Curse"		3:04
9.	"Porcelain Wings"		3:20
10.	"Forgive and Forget"		3:32
Total length:			34:15

15th Anniversary Edition
No.	Title	Length
1.	"A Dance with Aera Cura" (featuring Garrett Russell)	3:20
2.	"Architect" (featuring Brian Wille)	4:06
3.	"Not Our Tomorrow" (featuring Brandan Schieppati)	3:09
4.	"Arms of the Messiah" (featuring Scott Ian Lewis)	3:21
5.	"Apologies Are for the Weak" (featuring Anthony Notarmaso)	3:11
6.	"Harlot's Breath" (featuring Brook Reeves)	3:55
7.	"Tides" (featuring Jake Luhrs)	3:18
8.	"Blessing with a Curse" (featuring Trevor Wentworth)	3:03
9.	"Porcelain Wings" (featuring Tyler "Telle" Smith)	3:22
10.	"Forgive and Forget" (featuring Ryan "Tuck" O'Leary and Ryan Kirby)	3:35
Total length:		34:26

== Personnel ==
Miss May I

- Levi Benton – lead vocals, lyrics
- Josh Gillespie – bass guitar, clean vocals
- B.J. Stead – lead guitar
- Justin Aufdemkampe – rhythm guitar
- Jerod Boyd – drums
- Ryan Neff – bass guitar, clean vocals (15th Anniversary Edition)
- Elisha Mullins – lead & rhythm guitars (15th Anniversary Edition)

Production

- Joey Sturgis – producer, engineering, mixing and (on tracks 1 and 3) mastering, additional composition
- Jack Daniels – producer (15th Anniversary Edition)
- Dan Mumford – artwork, design
