= BAK (magazine) =

English and Turkish visual arts magazine

Bak is an online, bilingual (English and Turkish), visual arts magazine, first published on 1 January 2006. Published monthly, it features interviews with well-known graphic designers, illustrators, painters, film directors, photographers, 3D artists and sculptors and selected artworks from thousands of contributors all over the world. It is accessible on mobile platforms through its mobile edition.

== Features ==
The magazine is published in its two official languages (English and Turkish). It has an editorial aim of distributing works by enthusiasts to encourage sharing of ideas, interviewing globally well-known artists for expanding knowledge, and to fill the gap in the number of free-to-read, online, arts magazines. It has offices in Los Angeles and Istanbul.

== Issues ==
Each Bak issue has an individual theme. The contributors from all around the world submit their artworks related to that theme and the selected ones are picked for publication. Bak has 17 released issues so far, with the themes 'Wrong', 'White', 'Old', '2050', 'Game', 'Road', 'Dream', 'Me', 'Night', 'Why', 'Contrast', 'Red', 'Fear', 'Two', 'Love', 'City' and 'Face'.

== Interviews ==
Bak published 150 special interviews in 17 issues. Among the hosted artists, there are several world famous names such as Brad Holland, Chaz Maviyane Davies, Eugenio Recuenco, Gerard Huerta, Gottfried Helnwein, Jack Unruh, Jill Greenberg, Joseph Kosinski, Kent Williams, Lukas Moodysson, Oleg Stavrowsky, Si Scott, Tom Muller and Vince Frost.

== Awards ==
In 2007, Bak was awarded runner-up in the 6th Altin Orumcek Awards, in Online Magazine category.
