= Bloodwork (Texas in July album) =

Studio album by Texas in July
- Released: 16 September 2014
- Studio: Atrium Audio
- Genre: Metalcore
- Length: 40:51
- Label: Equal Vision Records
- Producers: Carson Slovak, Grant McFarland

Texas in July chronology
Texas in July (2012)	Bloodwork (2014)	Without Reason (2023)

Singles from Bloodwork
- 1. "Broken Soul" Released: June 16, 2014; 2. "Sweetest Poison" Released: August 21, 2014; 3. "Nooses" Released: August 28, 2014

Bloodwork is the fourth studio album by American metalcore band Texas in July. The album was released on September 16, 2014, through Equal Vision Records, and is the band's first album to feature vocalist J.T. Cavey. It is the band's last album before their breakup in 2015. As of 2025, it is the band's highest-charting release, reaching #71 on the Billboard 200.

== Background ==
Texas In July entered the studio in January 2014 with producers Carson Slovak and Grant McFarland to begin recording their fourth full length studio album. Slovak and McFarland had previously produced the band's first EP and full-length. On February 13, 2014, Texas In July posted a video on YouTube titled "New Beginnings," announcing that vocalist Alex Good and guitarist Christian Royer had decided to leave the band. Good's reason being to spend time with his family. Fill-in vocalist J.T. Cavey was announced to be Good's replacement in the video. On June 16, the band released a new song, "Broken Soul," the first studio recording to feature Cavey on vocals. On July 22, 2014, the band announced their new album titled Bloodwork. The album was subsequently released on September 16, 2014. Two additional singles were released to support the album, "Sweetest Poison" on August 21 (exclusively via Loudwire) on "Nooses" on August 28. The track "The Void" features Miss May I vocalist Levi Benton. The instrumental track "Decamilli" features The Word Alive guitarist Zack Hansen.

A music video, directed by Alejandro Zapata, was produced for the single "Sweetest Poison." The video debuted exclusively via Alternative Press on September 16. A video was also produced for the single "Nooses." The video premiered via Revolver on May 8, 2015, and was produced by Justin Beasley of KOTK Productions.

On April 17, 2015, the band announced their plans to break up by the end of 2015. A final headline tour of Europe shortly followed. The band finished their final North American tour in the December 2015 with Invent, Animate, Reflections, and To the Wind as support. After the band's break-up, J.T. Cavey would move on to join progressive metalcore band Erra, and guitarist Chris Davis would join The Ghost Inside. Nearly nine years later, the band would return with a new EP, titled "Without Reason."

== Critical Reception & Commercial Performance ==
Professional ratings
Review scores
Source	Rating
AllMusic	4.5/5 stars
Cryptic Rock	5/5 stars
The Show Last Night	8.5/10 stars

Commercially, the album charted at #71 on the Billboard 200 on October 4, 2014, making it the band's highest-charting release to date (as of 2025).

The album was received favorably by critics, with acclaim given to Cavey's vocal range, the album's heaviness, and the band's technical musicianship. The Show Last Night reviewer Tyler Norkunas calling the album a "shining example of technical metalcore," praising the band for its heaviest sound yet, the novelty of the album's opener "Broken Soul" diverging from their established sound, and praising the tracks "Pseudo Self" and "The Void" as examples of the "golden age" of metalcore from 5–7 years prior.

AllMusic reviewer Gregory Heaney praised the addition of Welsh and Cavey, saying that despite the addition of two new members, the band sounds "like anything but a band in transition." Cryptic Rock gave the album a 5/5/, highlighting Cavey's clean vocals and calling the release a "rambunctious technical mix." New Transcendence praised the band's technical guitarwork and drumming, and called the breakdowns on the album some of the best all year.

== Track listing ==
No.	Title	Length
1.	"Broken Soul"	4:04
2.	"Sweetest Poison"	4:31
3.	"Pseudo Self"	3:09
4.	"Defenseless"	3:13
5.	"The Void (featuring Levi Benton of Miss May I)"	3:48
6.	"Inner Demons"	4:01
7.	"Decamilli (featuring Zack Hansen of The Word Alive)"	3:22
8.	"Nooses"	3:07
9.	"The Tightrope"	3:42
10.	"Illuminate"	3:12
11.	"Bloodwork"	4:42
Total length:		40:51

== Charts ==
Chart (2014)	Peak position
US Billboard 200	71
US Independent Albums (Billboard)	18
US Top Hard Rock Albums (Billboard)	8
US Top Rock Albums (Billboard)	26
