= Mathematica (disambiguation) =

Wolfram Mathematica is a computer algebra system and programming language.

Mathematica may also refer to:

- Mathematica Inc. (1968–1986), a defunct research and software company
  - Mathematica Inc., a policy research organization spun-off from the above company, formerly known as Mathematica Policy Research
- Philosophiæ Naturalis Principia Mathematica, Newton's book on the basic laws of physics
- Mathematica: A World of Numbers... and Beyond, interactive mathematics exhibit (1961) designed by Charles and Ray Eames
- Principia Mathematica, Whitehead and Russell's work on axiomatizing mathematics

== See also ==
- Mathematics (disambiguation)
