= Matha, Charente-Maritime =

Matha
- Commune
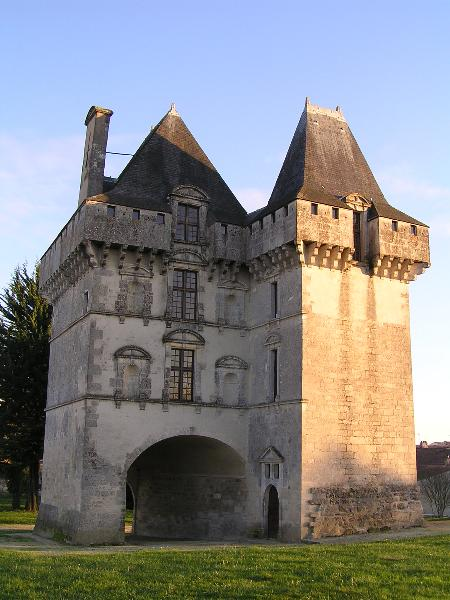
- Chateau

- Coat of arms
- Location of Matha
- Location within France Location within Nouvelle-Aquitaine
- Coordinates: 45°52′06″N 0°19′08″W
- Country: France
- Region: Nouvelle-Aquitaine
- Department: Charente-Maritime
- Arrondissement: Saint-Jean-d'Angély
- Canton: Matha

Government
  - Mayor (2020–2026): Wilfrid Hairie
- Area^{1}: 19.08 km^{2} (7.37 sq mi)
- Highest elevation: 68 m (223 ft)
- Lowest elevation: 23 m (75 ft)
- Population (2023): 2,191
  - Density: 114.8/km^{2} (297.4/sq mi)
- Time zone: UTC+01:00 (CET)
  - Summer (DST): UTC+02:00 (CEST)
- INSEE/Postal code: 17224 /17160
- ^{1} French Land Register data, which excludes lakes, ponds, glaciers > 1 km^{2} (0.386 sq mi or 247 acres) and river estuaries.

Matha (French pronunciation: [mata]) is a commune in the Charente-Maritime department in southwestern France.

== Population ==
In 1818 Matha absorbed the former commune of Saint-Hercé.

Historical population

| Year | Pop. | ±% p.a. |
|---|---|---|
| 1793 | 702 | — |
| 1821 | 1,572 | +2.92% |
| 1841 | 1,935 | +1.04% |
| 1861 | 2,212 | +0.67% |
| 1881 | 2,214 | +0.00% |
| 1901 | 2,034 | −0.42% |
| 1921 | 1,905 | −0.33% |
| 1936 | 1,934 | +0.10% |
| 1946 | 2,140 | +1.02% |
| 1954 | 2,057 | −0.49% |

| Year | Pop. | ±% p.a. |
|---|---|---|
| 1962 | 2,148 | +0.54% |
| 1968 | 2,141 | −0.05% |
| 1975 | 2,252 | +0.72% |
| 1982 | 2,300 | +0.30% |
| 1990 | 2,183 | −0.65% |
| 1999 | 2,082 | −0.52% |
| 2007 | 2,135 | +0.31% |
| 2012 | 2,205 | +0.65% |
| 2017 | 2,166 | −0.36% |
| 2023 | 2,191 | +0.19% |

Source: EHESS and INSEE (1968-2023)

== See also ==
- Communes of the Charente-Maritime department
