= Wake Pig =

Studio album by 3
- Released: October 26, 2004; November 1, 2005 (re-release)
- Recorded: The Center of Mindbody, Woodstock, NY
- Genre: Progressive rock; progressive metal; alternative rock
- Length: 46:56; 57:31 (re-release)
- Label: Planet Noise; Metal Blade (re-release)
- Producer: Thomas Hart Benton

3 chronology
Summercamp Nightmare (2003)	Wake Pig (2004)	These Iron Bones (2007)

Metal Blade cover

Professional ratings
Review scores
Source	Rating
AbsolutePunk	8.5/10
AllMusic	3/5 stars
Chronicles of Chaos	(7.5/10)
Metal Temple	9/10 stars
Plattentests.de	7/10
Rock Something	4/5 stars

Wake Pig is 3's third studio album. It was released on October 26, 2004, by Planet Noise Records. It was re-released on November 1, 2005, by Metal Blade Records. The album contains tracks that were previously featured on the band's 2003 album, Summercamp Nightmare. A music video was released for "Alien Angel" on August 10, 2006.

== Track listing ==
All tracks are written by 3.

Original release
No.	Title	Length
1.	"Alien Angel"	3:46
2.	"Where's Max"	2:15
3.	"Dregs"	3:26
4.	"Wake Pig"	3:14
5.	"Bramfatura"	1:40
6.	"Trust"	4:08
7.	"Dogs of War"	4:20
8.	"Soul to Sell"	2:36
9.	"Queen"	3:32
10.	"Monster"	2:43
11.	"Amazedisgrace" (contains an alternate version of "Trust" as a hidden track)	15:16
Total length:		46:56

All tracks are written by 3.

2005 release
No.	Title	Length
1.	"Alien Angel"	3:45
2.	"Monster"	2:37
3.	"Dregs"	3:23
4.	"Wake Pig"	3:14
5.	"Bramfatura"	1:40
6.	"Trust"	4:09
7.	"Dogs of War"	4:17
8.	"Soul to Sell"	2:34
9.	"One Way Town"	5:13
10.	"Queen"	3:32
11.	"Circus Without Clowns"	4:18
12.	"Where's Max"	2:17
13.	"Amaze Disgrace" (contains an alternate version of "Trust" as a hidden track)	16:24
Total length:		57:31

== Personnel ==
3

- Joey Eppard – lead vocals, guitar, mixing, producer, cover sculpture
- Billy Riker – guitar
- Joe Cuchelo – bass guitar
- Joe Stote – percussion, keyboards
- Chris Gartmann – drums
- Daniel Grimsland – bass guitar (tracks 9 and 11 on re-release)

Additional

- Tom Benton – executive producer
- Alison Braun – insert photography
- Brian Ames – insert design
- Robert Frazza – mixing ("Soul to Sell" and "Dregs")
- Ron Fierstein – management
- Brad Vance – mastering

== Release details ==
- 2004, USA, Planet Noise Records 690193001320, Release Date 26 October 2004, CD
- 2005, USA, Metal Blade Records 11123347, Release Date 1 November 2005, CD

== Additional information ==
- The titular song from the album is played in the 2007 horror movie Wrong Turn 2: Dead End, in a scene featuring actors Erica Leerhsen and Texas Battle.
