= Monument (Miss May I album) =

Studio album by Miss May I
- Released: August 17, 2010
- Recorded: May – June 2010
- Studios: The Foundation Recording Studios, Connersville, Indiana
- Genre: Melodic metalcore
- Length: 35:17
- Label: Rise
- Producers: Joey Sturgis; Landon Tewers (Deluxe Edition)

Miss May I chronology
Apologies Are for the Weak (2009)	Monument (2010)	At Heart (2012)

Deluxe CD cover

Singles from Monument
- 1. "Our Kings" Released: August 6, 2010; 2. "Relentless Chaos" Released: September 2, 2010; 3. "Masses of a Dying Breed" Released: June 30, 2011

Professional ratings
Review scores
Source	Rating
About.com	3/5 stars
Alternative Press	3.5/5 stars

Monument is the second studio album by American metalcore band Miss May I, released on August 17, 2010. This album debuted at No. 76 on the Billboard 200 chart.

== Release ==
On June 24, Miss May I announced via Facebook that the new album "Monument" will be released August 17 and that they are recording a video at Mansfield Prison for the song "Relentless Chaos." On July 14, guitarist Justin Aufdenkampe posted a picture on his Twitter account of the album's track list and song lengths. On August 5, it was announced that the song "Rust" would only be available through preorder on iTunes via the band's Facebook. On September 3, the video for "Relentless Chaos" was released via YouTube.

On May 21, 2011, it was announced that Monument would be released in a Deluxe Edition on June 21, 2011, featuring three new songs, the "Rust" b-side, and a DVD featuring music videos, interviews, live songs, and more.

== Track listing ==
No.	Title	Length
1.	"Our Kings"	3:12
2.	"Masses of a Dying Breed"	4:00
3.	"Answers"	2:51
4.	"Relentless Chaos"	3:25
5.	"Creations"	2:47
6.	"Gears"	4:02
7.	"Colossal"	3:40
8.	"We Have Fallen"	4:22
9.	"In Recognition"	3:17
10.	"Monument"	3:41
Total length:		35:17

iTunes bonus track
No.	Title	Length
11.	"Rust" (featuring Brandan Schieppati of Bleeding Through)	3:42
Total length:		38:59

Deluxe edition (re-issue)
No.	Title	Length
1.	"My Hardship"	3:29
2.	"Descending Discovery"	3:49
3.	"Forbidden"	3:13
4.	"Our Kings"	3:12
5.	"Masses of a Dying Breed"	4:00
6.	"Answers"	2:51
7.	"Relentless Chaos"	3:25
8.	"Creations"	2:47
9.	"Gears"	4:02
10.	"Colossal"	3:40
11.	"We Have Fallen"	4:22
12.	"In Recognition"	3:17
13.	"Monument"	3:41
14.	"Rust" (featuring Brandan Schieppati of Bleeding Through)	3:42
Total length:		49:12

== Personnel ==
=== Miss May I ===
- Levi Benton – lead vocals, programming
- Ryan Neff – bass, clean vocals, lead vocals track 9
- B.J. Stead – lead guitar
- Justin Aufdemkampe – rhythm guitar
- Jerod Boyd – drums

=== Guest musicians ===
- Brandan Schieppati – vocals on "Rust"

=== Production ===
- Production, engineering, mixing and mastering by Joey Sturgis
- Management by Chris Rubey & Eric Rushing (The Artery Foundation)
- Booking by Dave Shapiro (The Agency Group)
- Artwork by Yang Xueguo
- Layout by Sons of Nero

Deluxe Edition Production

- Production, engineering on tracks "My Hardship", "Descending Discovery" and "Forbidden" by Landon Tewers & Miss May I & Joey Sturgis (tracks: 4–14)
- Mixing & mastering by Joey Sturgis
- Artwork by God Machine
