= Been to the Future =

Studio album by Joey Eppard
- Released: December 3, 2002
- Genre: Folk/blues rock/experimental
- Length: 60:09
- Label: Planet Noise

Been to the Future is the solo album by Joey Eppard, the lead vocalist and guitarist for the band 3.

== Track listing ==
1. "Static" – 3:10
2. "Balloon" – 5:05
3. "Been to the Future" – 5:00
4. "Stranded in a Treetop" – 3:56
5. "Lay Down the Law" – 3:46
6. "Simple Words" – 3:58
7. "The Game" – 2:56
8. "Faster" – 3:53
9. "Paint by Number" – 3:25
10. "Helpless Belvedere" – 3:20
11. "Puddle" – 4:19
12. "Vinegar Hill" – 2:21
13. "Trail of Tears" – 5:48
14. "Amaze Disgrace" – 6:22
15. "Blood Lust Tusks" – 2:42

== Credits ==
- Joey Eppard — Vocals, guitar, songwriting.
- Billy Riker — Electric guitars (on Future, Balloon, and Trail of Tears).
- Robert Burke — Bass guitar (on Stranded in a Treetop). Drums and percussion, recording, mixing, producing (Stranded in a Treetop and Static).
- Bruce Berky — Recording, mixing (Paint by Number, Amaze Disgrace, Faster and Lay Down the Law).
- Julie Last — Recording (The Game and Puddle).
- Erik Sacino | Solar Gravity Studios — Back Cover Artwork
