= 3 (American band) =

American progressive rock band

- Also known as: Three
- Origin: Woodstock, New York, U.S.
- Genres: Progressive rock, new prog, alternative rock
- Years active: 1994–present
- Labels: Planet Noise Records (1999–2005); Metal Blade (2005–present)
- Members: Joey Eppard; Billy Riker; Chris Heitzman; Chris Gartmann
- Past members: Joe Cuchelo; Christopher John Bittner; Jason Foster; Josh Eppard; Joe Stote; Daniel Grimsland
- Website: http://www.theband3.com

3 (alternatively stylized as Three) is an American progressive rock band, formed in Woodstock, New York in 1994.

== History ==
The band was founded in 1994 as a three piece: Joey Eppard on guitar and lead vocals, Josh Eppard on drums and Chris Bittner on bass. They came to the attention of Universal Records after well-received performances at the Woodstock festival in 1994, eventually getting signed in 1998, but following an unstable relationship with the label through its series of corporate mergers, the band was left with little chance of releasing their album. Eventually, the band decided to release it on Planet Noise Records, a small indie label, and thenceforth managed themselves independently, until their 2005 signing with Metal Blade, on whose label they re-released Wake Pig in late 2005. Their career has been marked by several line-up changes, most notably Josh Eppard's departure to join Coheed and Cambria—the two bands used to be regular touring partners. The band has toured nationally several times, and have appeared on radio stations throughout the United States. Joey Eppard also has an active solo career and released a solo album, Been to the Future, in 2002.

When questioned about the band's name in an interview with Rock Something, Joey Eppard stated that they considered changing the name of the band several times, but always decided to keep the name 3. According to the same interview, the name of the band originally stems from Joey Eppard's own "fascination" with the number: "It is a reference to the construct of our reality as having predominantly 3 aspects. For example, we live in a 3 dimensional universe on the third planet from the sun, experiencing time as past, present and future in a form that consists of mind, body and spirit."

In separate tours in May and October 2007 the band toured with the British progressive rock group Porcupine Tree, on their Fear of a Blank Planet North American tour. 3 also went on the road with hard rock band Scorpions, and later finished up the second leg of the Fear of a Blank Planet tour with Porcupine Tree.

The music video for the song "All That Remains" was voted the No. 16 Video of 2007 on MTV2's Headbanger's Ball. It was directed, shot and animated by David Brodsky.

They were a part of the "Progressive Nation '08" tour with Dream Theater, Opeth, and Between the Buried and Me.

Their fifth studio album, Revisions, a compilation of re-recordings of never before released songs as well as selections from their first two studio albums, was released on October 27, 2009. At the time it was planned to be their final release on Metal Blade Records. They have already started to play a couple of their new songs ("One with the Sun" and "You are the Alien") at their live shows dating back to tours from late 2008. The band was due to record and release their next studio album for Roadrunner Records, but were subsequently dropped before any production began.

They have since re-signed with Metal Blade Records and released their sixth studio album The Ghost You Gave to Me on October 11, 2011.

== Style ==
In an interview, Joey Eppard explained the band's name, '3', originated from his interest in the number's recurring significance. He cited examples such as the three dimensions of space, Earth being the third planet from the sun, the three aspects of time (past, present, and future), and the mind-body-spirit connection. Eppard views these instances as evidence of the number three being a fundamental aspect of reality.

The band themselves describe their music as "dark yet uplifting, spiritual without any connection to religion". Their music is punctuated by dark, sometimes incomprehensible lyrics, often rather detached from the accompanying music. Joey Eppard is considered a highly competent guitarist with a unique, primarily self-taught flamenco/slap hybrid guitar technique. Over the course of 3's discography, the band has explored a wide variety of musical genres, such as hip hop, R&B, rockabilly, blues, reggae, funk, psychedelic music, heavy metal music, pop rock, acoustic rock, punk, progressive, flamenco, experimental progressive, rock 'n roll, soft rock, pop, folk, experimental, progressive funk, and progressive metal.

== Members ==
Current

- Joey Eppard – lead vocals, acoustic & electric guitars (1994–present)
- Billy Riker – guitars, effects (1999–present)
- Chris "Gartdrumm" Gartmann – drums, backing vocals (1999–present)
- Chris Heitzman – bass (2025–present)

Former

- Josh Eppard – drums, percussion, backing vocals (1994–1999)
- Chris Bittner – bass (1994–2003)
- Jason Foster – guitars (1999)
- Joe Cuchelo – bass (2003–2004)
- Joe Stote – keyboards, percussion (2003–2008)
- Daniel Grimsland – bass, backing vocals (2004–2025)

== Discography ==
=== Studio albums ===
List of studio albums
Title	Album details
Paint by Number	Released: March 16, 2000; Label: Planet Noise; Format: CD, DL
Summercamp Nightmare	Released: October 7, 2003; Label: Planet Noise; Format: CD
Wake Pig	Released: October 26, 2004; Label: Planet Noise, Metal Blade (2005 re-release); Format: CD, DL
The End Is Begun	Released: July 24, 2007; Label: Metal Blade; Format: CD, DL
Revisions	Released: October 27, 2009; Label: Metal Blade; Format: CD, DL
The Ghost You Gave to Me	Released: October 11, 2011; Label: Metal Blade; Format: CD, DL

=== Live albums ===
List of live albums
Title	Album details
Half Life	Released: December 17, 2002; Label: Planet Noise; Format: CD

=== Extended plays ===
List of extended plays
Title	EP details
These Iron Bones (iTunes exclusive)	Released: May 8, 2007; Label: Metal Blade; Format: DL

=== Singles ===
Year	Song	Album
1999	"Wrongside"	Paint by Number
2006	"Alien Angel"	Wake Pig
2014	"Sugarlife"	Non-album single
2014	"You Are the Alien"	Non-album single
2014	"One Way Town" (Live at The Anchor)	Non-album single
2014	"It's Alive" (Live at The Bearsville Theater)	Non-album single
2014	"Woodchuck Truck"	Non-album single
2015	"Crazy Eyes"	Non-album single
2015	"The End Is Begun" (Live at The Anchor)	Non-album single

=== Compilation appearances ===
Year	Song	Compilation	Label
1994	"Summer"	Where Woodstock Lives	Tinker Street
2006	"Alien Angel"	Metal Massacre Vol. 13	Metal Blade

== Videography ==
Year	Song	Album
2000	"Wrongside"	Paint by Number
2006	"Alien Angel"	Wake Pig
2007	"All That Remains"	The End Is Begun
2009	"Rabid Animals"	Revisions
